= Caribbean's Next Top Model season 2 =

Caribbean's Next Top Model
- Season 2
- No. of episodes: 11

Release
- Original network: Flow TV
- Original release: October 19 – December 22, 2015

Season chronology
- ← Previous; Season 1 Next → Season 3

The second season of Caribbean's Next Top Model, a Caribbean reality television show, premiered on October 19, 2015. It features a number of aspiring models from the entire Caribbean region, who compete for a chance to begin their career in the modelling industry.

This cycle features a smaller cast, from 12 contestants last season to 11, two from Trinidad and Tobago and one from Antigua and Barbuda, Barbados, Cayman Islands, Grenada, Jamaica, Puerto Rico, Saint Lucia, Saint Vincent and the Grenadines and Suriname. Antigua and Barbuda, Grenada, Puerto Rico, Saint Lucia, Saint Vincent and the Grenadines mark their debut this season while Bahamas, Curaçao and Guadeloupe have no representation.

The winner of the competition was 19 year-old Kittisha Doyle from Grenada. In addition to her win, she received a cash price of $25.000, a modeling contract with Mint Management in New York City, a cover and spread in She magazine and a movie role.

== Casting ==
Casting calls for the second season were held in July and August 2015 in Barbados, Cayman Islands, Jamaica and Trinidad and Tobago. Participants were also encouraged to sign up online to make it more accessible for potential participants throughout the region.

== Contestants ==
(ages stated are at start of contest)

Country	Contestant	Age	Hometown	Finish	Place
Suriname	Raquel Wijnerman	23	Paramaribo	Episode 3	11-10
Barbados	Carol-Ann King	21	Bridgetown	Episode 3	11-10
Trinidad and Tobago	Krissle Garcia	18	Port of Spain	Episode 4	9
Jamaica	Mackella Moo-Young	19	Kingston	Episode 5	8
Trinidad and Tobago	Lia Ross	20	Port of Spain	Episode 6	7
Saint Vincent	Yugge Farrell	22	Kingstown	Episode 7	6
Cayman Islands	Sydney Solomon	20	George Town	Episode 8	5
Antigua and Barbuda	Nicoya Henry	24	St. John's	Episode 9	4
Saint Lucia	Ayana Jeune Whitehead	19	Castries	Episode 9	3
Puerto Rico	Linda Mejia Torres	28	Luquillo	Episode 11	2
Grenada	Kittisha Doyle	19	St. George's	Episode 11	1

== Episodes ==
=== Episode 1: Caribbean Pool ===
Original Airdate: October 19, 2015

The contestants for season two of Caribbean's Next Top Model are introduced. Later, the models prepare to meet the judges for the first time.

=== Episode 2: Point & Click ===
Original Airdate: October 26, 2015

The pool of fifteen semi-finalists is reduced by five, and Wendy Fitzwilliam chooses the final ten contestants who will move into the top model house to fight for the title of Caribbean's Next Top Model.

- Eliminated: Aaliyah Hydes, Anasha Dutchin, Marisa Jackson, Safora Jap A Joe & Shenelle Flanders
- Wildcard contestant: Krissle Garcia

=== Episode 3: Make-up or Break-up ===
Original Airdate: November 3, 2015

The models were taught to enhance and complement their beauty by international beauty and fashion model Lene Hall. The make-up challenge was won by Lia. Next up, they went to Lanterns Mall for the model makeovers and the tension, tempers and tears begin to flare as the girls break up with their former selves so that their inner model emerges and then they have a group shot with their makeover. At judging panel, Carol-Ann & Raquel was eliminated in surprise double elimination.

- Challenge winner: Mackella Moo-Young
- First call-out: Lia Ross
- Bottom two: Carol-Ann King & Raquel Wijnerman
- Eliminated: Carol-Ann King & Raquel Wijnerman
- Special guest: Lene Hall

=== Episode 4: Channelling King Midas ===
Original Airdate: November 10, 2015

The models are put through their paces to understand their body lines and the art of posing by judge Richard Young. The models are then taken to the studio and body painted in gold to bring their fierce and strike statuesque poses to determine who will remain in the running to become Caribbean’s Next Top Model. At judging panel, Krissle was eliminated.

- First call-out: Kittisha Doyle
- Bottom two: Krissle Garcia & Sydney Solomon
- Eliminated: Krissle Garcia

=== Episode 5: Surf's Up ===
Original Airdate: November 16, 2015

The models are taught the fundamentals of surfing and the need to mirror that balance and core strength when striking a pose. They then compete in a paddle board challenge which creates a splash for those who cannot swim. The models went to Mullins Beach and participate in a classic swimsuit photoshoot to determine if those lessons in core strength resonated. The best of the bunch remain in the running, but Mackella wais the next one to go home.

- First call-out: Yugge Farrell
- Bottom two: Mackella Moo-Young & Sydney Solomon
- Eliminated: Mackella Moo-Young

=== Episode 6: Sssssss ===
Original Airdate: November 23, 2015

The models are thrown into the real world with their go-sees as they meet designers who determine if they would book them or not for their own lines of clothing. On the photoshoot, they went to Flower Forest. Hollywood Stylist and designer Charlie Lapson shows the girls how to bring their best fierce while wrapped in his elegant jewels along with pythons. At judging panel, Lia was eliminated.

- First call-out: Nicoya Henry
- Bottom two: Ayana Jeune Whitehead & Lia Ross
- Eliminated: Lia Ross
- Special guest: Charlie Lapson

=== Episode 7: Come on move this ===
Original Airdate: November 30, 2015

The models are given pointers from head judge Wendy Fitzwilliam. She highlights each girls strength thus far, but more importantly her weakness and how each of them can move and align their bodies to accentuate their best assets and move up to the top of the judges’ leader board. Along the beautiful Bajan West Coast, the girls have a retro Pin-up photo shoot at Drift Bar on The Beach House. Movement specialist and lead actor, Dani Swan, in the upcoming movie Cerulean does the Creative Direction. At judging panel, Yugge was eliminated.

- First call-out: Kittisha Doyle
- Bottom two: Sydney Solomon & Yugge Farrell
- Eliminated: Yugge Farrell
- Special guest: Dani Swan

=== Episode 8: Doh Jumbie Meh ===
Original Airdate: December 7, 2015

The models overcome any fears of heights as they are taught to stilt walk as Moko Jumbies, elevating their poise and challenging their core strength. Lead photographer and judge Pedro Virgil takes the girls to Carlisle Bay beach for a Carnival themed photo shoot where the ladies must bring their festive best. At judging panel, Sydney was eliminated.

- First call-out: Kittisha Doyle
- Bottom two: Ayana Jeune Whitehead & Sydney Solomon
- Eliminated: Sydney Solomon

=== Episode 9: Inter-Act-ion ===
Original Airdate: December 14, 2015

Movement specialist and lead actor in the upcoming movie Cerulean, Dani Swan, gives the girls some acting tips under the watchful eye of FLOW brand executive, Bernard Stewart, as the models are challenged to convince Bernard that they are worthy of being FLOW Ambassadors. The models need to focus on their poise and balance as they pose aboard a catamaran out in the clear, beautiful Shallow Draft ocean. At judging panel, Ayana & Nicoya was eliminated.

- First call-out: Kittisha Doyle
- Bottom three: Ayana Jeune Whitehead, Linda Mejia Torres & Nicoya Henry
- Eliminated: Ayana Jeune Whitehead & Nicoya Henry
- Special guest: Bernard Stewart, Dani Swan & Jo Lance

=== Episode 10: Tis the Season ===
Original Airdate: December 21, 2015

A recap of the entire season is aired, showing all the highlights, melt downs, triumphs and behind the scenes footage. The villains, the victors and the girls next door are featured in all their splendour as the viewers get greater insight into the journeys that each model took to get to that point and only the very best are left to emerge as Caribbean’s Next Top Model

=== Episode 11: All I do is Win Win Win ===
Original Airdate: December 22, 2015

The final two models have a high fashion photo shoot on The Pier at the Radisson Aquatica to prove their ability to do editorial for noted Caribbean magazine editor, Mae Wayne in the elegantly detailed and beaded couture collection of Puerto Rican designer, Sonia Santiago. The finalists are then challenged to strut the runway in the high fashion collections of Barbados’ most recognized and versatile designers going from avant garde to island chic in minutes. The winner emerges and the Caribbean’s Next Top Model is Kittisha.

- Final two: Kittisha Doyle & Linda Mejia Torres
- Caribbean's Next Top Model: Kittisha Doyle
- Guest judge: Mae Wayne

== Summaries ==
=== Call-out order ===
Order	Episodes								
Order	2 (Note: In episode 2, the pool of fifteen semi-finalists was narrowed down to the top ten. Before the cast was selected, Wendy revealed that Krissle would advance into the competition as a wildcard contestant, bringing the number of finalists to eleven.)	3 (Note: In episode 3, Carol-Ann and Raquel landed in the bottom two. Both of them were eliminated.)	4	5	6	7	8	9 (Note: In episode 9, Ayana, Linda and Nicoya landed in the bottom three. Ayana was eliminated first, leaving Linda and Nicoya as the bottom two. Nicoya was the second contestant eliminated.)	11
1	Nicoya	Lia	Kittisha	Yugge	Nicoya	Kittisha	Kittisha	Kittisha	Kittisha
2	Lia	Ayana	Lia	Nicoya	Kittisha	Nicoya	Nicoya	Ayana	Linda
3	Yugge	Linda	Nicoya	Lia	Sydney	Ayana	Linda	Linda	
4	Linda	Sydney	Mackella	Linda	Yugge	Linda	Ayana	Nicoya	
5	Kittisha	Krissle	Linda	Kittisha	Linda	Sydney	Sydney		
6	Ayana	Mackella	Ayana	Ayana	Ayana	Yugge			
7	Sydney	Kittisha	Yugge	Sydney	Lia				
8	Raquel	Nicoya	Sydney	Mackella					
9	Mackella	Yugge	Krissle						
10	Carol-Ann	Carol-Ann; Raquel							
11		Carol-Ann; Raquel							

The contestant was eliminated
The contestant won the competition.

=== Bottom two/three ===
Episode	Contestants			Eliminated
3	Carol-Ann	&	Raquel	Carol-Ann
3	Carol-Ann	&	Raquel	Raquel
4	Krissie	&	Sydney	Krissie
5	Mackella	&	Sydney	Mackella
6	Ayana	&	Lia	Lia
7	Sydney	&	Yugge	Yugge
8	Ayana	&	Sydney	Sydney
9	Ayana	Linda	Nicoya	Nicoya
9	Ayana	Linda	Nicoya	Ayana
10	Kittisha	&	Linda	Linda

The contestant was eliminated after her first time in the bottom two/three
The contestant was eliminated after her third time in the bottom two/three
The contestant was eliminated after her fourth time in the bottom two/three
The contestant was eliminated in the final judging and placed as the runner-up

=== Photo shoot guide ===
- Episode 2 photo shoot: Extreme posing; natural beauty shots (casting)
- Episode 3 photo shoot: Makeovers
- Episode 4 photo shoot: Nude and covered with gold body paint
- Episode 5 photo shoot: Bikinis on Mullins beach
- Episode 6 photo shoot: Diamond Jewelry shoot with snakes
- Episode 7 photo shoot: Pin-up girls in pairs
- Episode 8 photo shoot: Carnival on the beach
- Episode 9 photo shoot: Dynamic posing on a catamaran
- Episode 11 photo shoot: White and silver evening gowns

== Judges ==
- Wendy Fitzwilliam (Host/Head judge) Supermodel
- Pedro Virgil (Judge) Fashion photographer
- Richard Young (Judge) Creative director
