= Goudon (surname) =

Goudon is a French surname. Notable people with the surname include:

- Fred Goudon (fl. early 21st century), French photographer
- Thierry Goudon (born 1969), French mathematician
