= Caribbean's Next Top Model season 3 =

Caribbean's Next Top Model
- Season 3
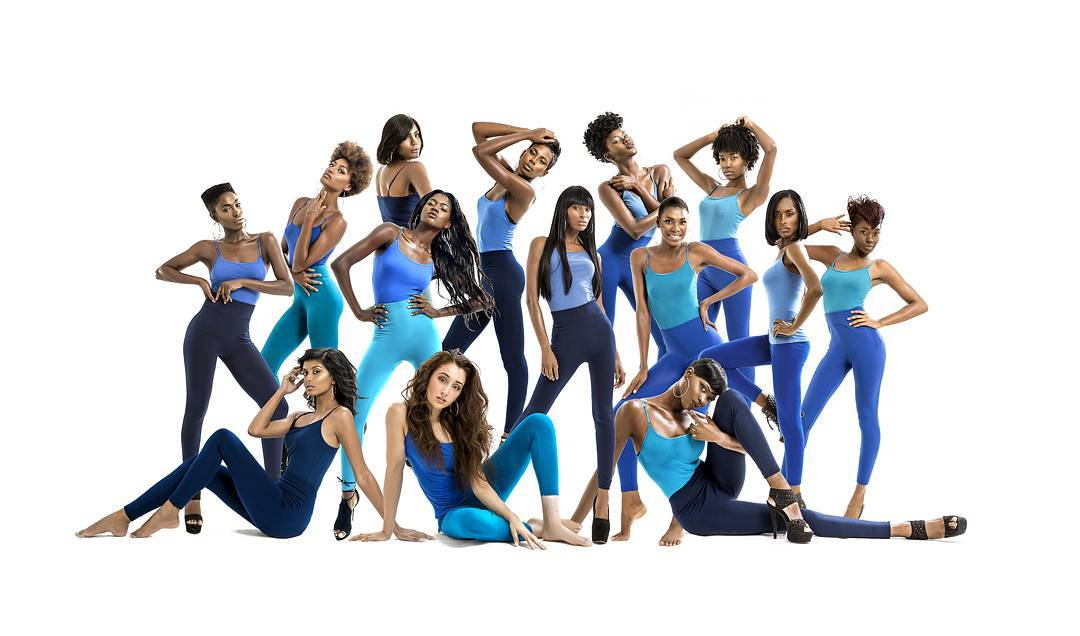
- No. of episodes: 11

Release
- Original network: Flow TV
- Original release: January 30 – April 3, 2017

Season chronology
- ← Previous; Season 2 Next → Season 4

The third season of the Caribbean reality television show Caribbean's Next Top Model premiered on January 30, 2017. The show features a group of aspiring models from the entire Caribbean region, with the winner being offered a career in the modelling industry. The third season of the show has 14 contestants and was taped in Grenada. Also a new judge was added to the panel.

== Cast ==
=== Contestants ===
(Ages stated are at start of contest)

Country	Contestant	Age	Finish	Place
Sint Maarten	Nina Victor	19	Episode 2	14-13
Jamaica	Altena Wilson	23	Episode 2	14-13
Grenada	Zahada Harper	21	Episode 3	12
Jamaica	Sashawna Flake	25	Episode 3	11
Trinidad and Tobago	Iyepha Biggot	20	Episode 4	10
Dominica	Lynah Bontiff	25	Episode 5	9
Jamaica	Chenise Cumberland	21	Episode 5	8
Barbados	Tonisha Rock-Yaw	24	Episode 6	7
Trinidad and Tobago	Tanisha Lalla	21	Episode 7	6
Grenada	Nikita Maibaum	21	Episode 8	5
Saint Lucia	Lisa-Marie Faustin	23	Episode 9	4
Trinidad and Tobago	Samantha West	19	Episode 11	3-2
Guyana	Nkechi Vaughn	21	Episode 11	3-2
Jamaica	Shamique Simms	23	Episode 11	1

=== Judges ===
- Wendy Fitzwilliam (host)
- Pedro Virgil
- Socrates McKinney

== Episodes ==
No. overall	No. in season	Title	Original release date
22	1	"Episode 1"	30 January 2017
The semi-finalists attended casting, and had their very first photo shoot. At the end of the week, the judges selected the final 14.: Eliminated: Gabrielle Minors, Karen Rampersad & Nyierah Placide
23	2	"Episode 2"	30 January 2017
The contestants received makeovers, and took part in a promotional photo shoot that would serve as the season's fade-out at the end of each elimination. At panel, Altena and Nina became the first contestants to leave the competition.: First call-out: Tanisha Lalla; Bottom two: Altena Wilson & Nina Victor; Eliminated: Altena Wilson & Nina Victor
24	3	"Episode 3"	6 February 2017
The remaining models were introduced to American linebacker Quentin Groves, and had a photo shoot in groups where they posed as football cheerleaders. At panel, Zahada and Sashawna left the competition in a double elimination.: First call-out: Chenise Cumberland; Bottom three: Nikita Maibaum, Sashawna Flake & Zahada Harper; Eliminated: Sashawna Flake & Zahada Micarla; Special guests: Quentin Groves
25	4	"Episode 4"	13 February 2017
First call-out: Samantha West; Bottom two: Iyepha Biggot & Lynah Bontiff; Eliminated: Iyepha Biggot
26	5	"Episode 5"	20 February 2017
First call-out: Shamique Simms; Bottom three: Chenise Cumberland, Lynah Bontiff & Tanisha Lalla; Eliminated: Chenise Cumberland & Lynah Bontiff
27	6	"Episode 6"	27 February 2017
First call-out: Nkechi Vaughn; Bottom two: Lisa-Marie Faustin & Tonisha Rock-Yaw; Eliminated: Tonisha Rock-Yaw
28	7	"Episode 7"	6 March 2017
First call-out: Samantha West; Bottom two: Nikita Maibaum & Tanisha Lalla; Eliminated: Tanisha Lalla
29	8	"Episode 8"	13 March 2017
First call-out: Lisa-Marie Faustin; Bottom two: Nikita Maibaum & Shamique Simms; Eliminated: Nikita Maibaum
30	9	"Episode 9"	20 March 2017
First call-out: Shamique Simms; Bottom two: Lisa-Marie Faustin & Samantha West; Eliminated: Lisa-Marie Faustin
31	10	"Episode 10"	27 March 2017
This episode recapped the entire season, and showed previously unaired footage for the first time.
32	11	"Episode 11"	3 April 2017
Final Three: Nkechi Vaughn, Samantha West & Shamique Simms; Caribbean's Next Top Model: Shamique Simms

== Results ==
Order	Episodes									
Order	1 (Note: In episode 1, the pool of seventeen semi-finalists was narrowed down to the top fourteen contestants.)	2 (Note: In episode 2, Altena and Nina landed in the bottom two. Both of them were eliminated.)	3 (Note: In episode 3, Sashawna was eliminated first, leaving Nikita and Zahada as the bottom two. Zahada was the second contestant eliminated.)	4	5 (Note: In episode 5, Chenise was eliminated first, leaving Lynah and Tanisha as the bottom two. Lynah was the second contestant eliminated.)	6	7	8	9	11
1	Zahada	Tanisha	Chenise	Samantha	Shamique	Nkechi	Samantha	Lisa-Marie	Shamique	Shamique
2	Lisa-Marie	Lisa-Marie	Samantha	Tanisha	Nkechi	Tanisha	Nkechi	Samantha	Nkechi	Samantha; Nkechi
3	Shamique	Shamique	Nkechi	Nkechi	Nikita	Shamique	Shamique	Nkechi	Samantha	Samantha; Nkechi
4	Tanisha	Chenise	Tonisha	Lisa-Marie	Lisa-Marie	Samantha	Lisa-Marie	Shamique	Lisa-Marie	
5	Tonisha	Zahada	Lisa-Marie	Tonisha	Tonisha	Nikita	Nikita	Nikita		
6	Sashawna	Nkechi	Iyepha	Nikita	Samantha	Lisa-Marie	Tanisha			
7	Altena	Iyepha	Tanisha	Shamique	Chenise	Tonisha				
8	Iyepha	Samantha	Shamique	Chenise	Tanisha					
9	Chenise	Tonisha	Lynah	Lynah	Lynah					
10	Samantha	Nikita	Sashawna	Iyepha						
11	Nkechi	Sashawna	Nikita							
12	Nikita	Lynah	Zahada							
13	Nina	Altena; Nina								
14	Lynah	Altena; Nina								

The contestant was eliminated
The contestant won the competition

=== Bottom two/three ===
Episodes	Contestants			Eliminated
2	Altena	&	Nina	Altena
2	Altena	&	Nina	Nina
3	Nikita	Sashawna	Zahada	Zahada
3	Nikita	Sashawna	Zahada	Sashawna
4	Iyepha	&	Lynah	Iyepha
5	Chenise	Lynah	Tanisha	Lynah
5	Chenise	Lynah	Tanisha	Chenise
6	Angie-Marie	&	Tonisha	Tonisha
7	Nikita	&	Tanisha	Tanisha
8	Nikita	&	Shamique	Nikita
9	Angie-Marie	&	Samantha	Angie-Marie
11	Nkechi	Samantha	Shamique	Samantha
11	Nkechi	Samantha	Shamique	Nkechi

The contestant was eliminated after their first time in the bottom two
The contestant was eliminated after their second time in the bottom two
The contestant was eliminated after their third time in the bottom two
The contestant was eliminated and placed as the runner-up

=== Photo shoot guide ===
- Episode 1 photo shoot: Comp cards (casting)
- Episode 2 photo shoot: Makeovers
- Episode 3 photo shoot: Football cheerleaders
- Episode 4 photo shoot: Posing underwater
- Episode 5 photo shoot: Coco & Breezy sunglasses
- Episode 6 photo shoot: Neon swimwear in the woods
- Episode 7 photo shoot: Embodying Jab Jab
- Episode 8 video shoot: Mock sports forecast
- Episode 9 photo shoot: Glamorous women in a Grenadian market
- Episode 11 photo shoot: SHE Magazine Covers
