= Michael Witt =

Australian rugby league & union footballer

Personal information
- Born: 1 January 1984 (age 42) Toowoomba, Queensland, Australia

Playing information
- Height: 180 cm (5 ft 11 in)
- Weight: 88 kg (13 st 12 lb)

Rugby league
- Position: Five-eighth, Halfback
Club
Years	Team	Pld	T	G	FG	P
2003–04	Parramatta Eels	27	6	75	2	176
2005–06	Manly Sea Eagles	20	5	62	0	144
2007–09	New Zealand Warriors	43	12	121	1	291
2010–11	Crusaders RL	42	13	58	4	172
2012–13	London Broncos	43	14	104	2	266
2014	St. George Illawarra	4	1	0	0	4
	Total	179	51	420	9	1053
Representative
Years	Team	Pld	T	G	FG	P
2006	NSW Residents	1	0	4	0	8

Rugby union
Club
Years	Team	Pld	T	G	FG	P
2009	Otago	7	0	1	0	3
- Education: Harristown State High School
- Relatives: Steve Witt (brother)

Michael Witt (born 1 January 1984) is an Australian former professional rugby league footballer who played in Australasia's National Rugby League (NRL) competition for the Parramatta Eels, Manly-Warringah Sea Eagles and the New Zealand Warriors, before a season playing rugby union in the Air New Zealand Cup. He then returned to rugby league, playing in the Super League for Crusaders RL and the London Broncos. Witt then played one more season in Australia for the St. George Illawarra Dragons.

== Background ==
Growing up in Toowoomba, Queensland, Witt attended Harristown State High School where he was a champion junior boxer and played rugby league for the Newtown Lions in the local junior competition, and he later went on to represent Queensland in rugby league at the Under 15 level in 1999 and the Under 16 level in 2000. During 1999 he was spotted by the Parramatta Eels as a player with much potential and he was offered a scholarship by the club, which he accepted, and in the following year he moved to Sydney to join his older brother Steven at Parramatta, where he spent the next three seasons in the lower grades. During the 2002 season, Witt played in the SG Ball Grand Final, where his Parramatta team was defeated 18-16 by the Western Suburbs Magpies. When Parramatta's regular halfback Paul Green was injured (causing his retirement from the game), Witt was promoted to the team as Green's replacement to make his National Rugby League début on 2 May 2003. Despite a very promising début from Witt, Parramatta were soundly beaten 44-12 by the Sydney Roosters in a Friday night game at Parramatta Stadium.

== Professional playing career ==
=== Parramatta Eels ===
Before Witt's debut, Parramatta had won just two games from seven in 2003, and were looking very likely to be out of the semi-finals race very early on in the season. But Witt sparked the disappointing Eels to life, and the team won ten from their last fourteen games of the season to narrowly miss qualifying for the semi-finals. In one of his early games in the NRL he encountered extreme disappointment in missing two crucial, but easy (by his standards) goals which saw Parramatta lose narrowly 18–16 to the New Zealand Warriors.

On The Michael Witt Story that aired on The NRL Footy Show later that year, Witt admitted that he felt like he had let the whole Parramatta organisation down with those missed attempts at goal, but he soon quickly overcame this early setback to become one of the form players in the NRL with many commentators impressed with his maturity and the sharpness of his skills. Some of the highlights of his first season included the sideline conversion to seal Parramatta's come-from-behind victory over the North Queensland Cowboys at Parramatta Stadium, and his first half effort against the South Sydney Rabbitohs at Sydney Football Stadium, where his two classy tries set up Parramatta's easy 34–20 win.

Witt scored a haul of 18 points in that match, and was Parramatta's leading pointscorer in 2003 with 104 points from three tries, 45 goals and two field goals. His great first season in the NRL saw him win Parramatta's Rookie of the Year award as well as being selected in the New South Wales Under 19 team to play Queensland in an interstate representative match. Unfortunately though for Witt, a shoulder injury prevented him from playing. He was also among the main contenders for the Dally M Rookie of the Year award, which was won by the Melbourne Storm's Billy Slater. Witt was rewarded for his great form with a new, lucrative four-year contract to stay with Parramatta.

2004 started promisingly with Witt being named in the emerging Queensland State of Origin squad in the early part of the season. However, he was very surprisingly not selected in first grade until Round 12, despite Parramatta's very poor form until that time and calls from many fans for him to be selected, wondering why Parramatta's Rookie of the Year just twelve months previously now seemed to be out of favour with Parramatta coach Brian Smith. Witt's return sparked a limited recovery for Parramatta, which included an upset 26–12 victory over eventual Grand Finalists the Sydney Roosters, with Witt's pinpoint accurate bombs resulting in three tries for winger Luke Burt.

But the Eels finished well down the ladder with just nine wins to finish 12th. Adding to the disappointment was Witt receiving a two-week suspension for a dangerous throw in a game against the Newcastle Knights in June. But the most disappointing occurrence of 2004 happened post season, when Parramatta announced that Witt was "not in their first grade plans" for 2005, despite him having another three years to go on his contract. This came just weeks after he turned in a supreme effort against the New Zealand Warriors where he scored 24 points from two tries and eight goals in a 48–18 win at Parramatta Stadium, and had scored 72 points from three tries and 30 goals in his limited appearances during the course of the season. However, upon his release by Parramatta, Witt was very quickly signed by the Manly-Warringah Sea Eagles as part of their impressive build-up for the 2005 season and during the 2004-05 off season, Witt employed the tutoring of Australian soccer great Graham Arnold to further finesse his goalkicking talents.

=== Manly-Warringah Sea Eagles ===
Witt, along with fellow blue chip signings Ben Kennedy and Brent Kite, added much needed player strength at Manly in 2005 and the club qualified for its first semi finals series since 1998 and finished in eighth position. For the first half of the season Manly was among the dominant teams of the NRL, and Witt's form correspondingly at five-eighth was some of the best of his career to date, prompting Manly officials to publicly thank Parramatta for releasing him. Among the highlights were excellent performances in the victories over eventual Premiers Wests Tigers and in the amazing come-from-behind win against the Penrith Panthers. Penrith led 26-6 early in the second half, before a Witt-inspired Manly team powered home to win 36–26 at Brookvale Oval. Also during this period, Witt kicked 20 successive goals without a miss. However, Manly found wins hard to come by in the second half of the season, and Witt experienced the same frustrations that plagued his 2004. In a match in July against the Wests Tigers, he received a one-week suspension for striking Liam Fulton. And after a disappointing 36–10 loss to the St George Illawarra Dragons a few weeks later, Witt was dropped from the first grade squad after being targeted by the big Dragons forwards due to his perceived defensive deficiencies. Manly coach Des Hasler used a number of forwards at five-eighth in subsequent games, but with very little success, and Witt was drafted back into the side for the semi-final against Parramatta. Despite Manly being hopelessly outclassed 46–22 to be eliminated, Witt sent the crowd alight by scoring one of the best tries of 2005, as he weaved through the Parramatta defence and sprinted fifty metres to score under the posts. However, this great moment was marred by yet another two-week suspension, this time for a high tackle on Eels hooker Mark Riddell. Witt was among the leading pointscorers in the NRL for 2005, scoring 140 points from five tries and 60 goals from 19 appearances.

With Witt's two match suspension ruling him ineligible in Manly's two NRL-sanctioned pre-season trial matches for 2006, unproven rookie Travis Burns was able to take advantage of his absence and was preferred by coach Des Hasler as Manly's regular five-eighth for the season (despite Witt being the incumbent in that position at the end of 2005), and Witt was given only one start in first grade for the year against Newcastle in Round 17 (following Burns' suspension for one week). Witt performed very credibly in his only appearance, despite Manly's 26–12 loss at Brookvale Oval. Starting the year in the NSWRL Premier League, Witt's class shone even further in lesser company, playing at both five-eighth and halfback and helping Manly to a number of large victories, with the team finishing fourth and just missed qualifying for the Grand Final. This strong form throughout 2006 led to Witt's selection at five-eighth for the NSW Residents team to play Queensland Residents in a representative match played prior to the third State of Origin match at the Telstra Dome in Melbourne, where Witt steered NSW Residents to a comfortable 28–20 win. He was also the first player in the Premier League competition to score 100 points for the season, a mark he reached in early May, and finished the year with 256 points from 17 tries and 94 goals.

As opportunities at Manly became increasingly limited, Witt signed with the New Zealand Warriors for the 2007 season on a one-year contract.

=== New Zealand Warriors ===
Witt arrived at his new club in November 2006 determined to re-establish himself as a regular NRL player after the lean season he'd just had at Manly, and strong performances in the three trial matches at five-eighth saw Witt earn a spot for the opening round game for 2007 against Parramatta, where the Warriors eased to a resounding 34–18 win. In the following weeks, the Warriors continued their year in impressive fashion, winning five of their first seven games with the fifth win coming in the final seconds against South Sydney courtesy of a radar-like controlled kick from Witt that set up a try for winger Todd Byrne. Witt settled in well within the team and his good early season form impressed club officials enough to quickly extend his contract from the original one-year deal to the end of 2009. Following this win against the Rabbitohs though the Warriors fell into a slump, losing their next five games with Witt being briefly shifted to halfback after the regular no.7 Grant Rovelli was dropped for poor form. Also during this losing streak Witt received a one-week suspension for a dangerous throw on Misi Taulapapa in the Warriors' narrow loss to Cronulla at Mount Smart Stadium. With the Warriors' designated kicker Tony Martin being left out of the team that round, Witt assumed the kicking duties. While Tony Martin was back the following week against Penrith, he was injured early in the game, and Witt again assumed the role of goalkicker (and for rest of the season) and finished the game with 20 points from two tries and six goals (his biggest haul in a game since 2005). After landing eight goals from eight attempts, his unbroken run of successful goals in the NRL competition grew to 25 (stretching back to his only first grade appearance in 2006), and was only 10 short of the record set by Bulldogs winger, Hazem El Masri. However Witt's run ended a week later against the Wests Tigers at 28, after missing a conversion from out wide. By this time, the Warriors were well ensconced in the top eight, and they qualified for the finals well placed in fourth position. However successive losses in the finals to Parramatta and North Queensland ended the Warriors' hopes for 2007. Also during 2007, Witt broke Daryl Halligan's record for the best success rate in a season, with his kicking percentage for the year being 92.5% (62 goals from 67 attempts). The previous record set by Halligan was 87.1% in 2000.

Season 2008 started slowly for the Warriors and Witt, and Witt turned in arguably his worst performance of his career in Round 3 as the Warriors were crushed 52-6 by eventual premiers Manly at Brookvale Oval. But the Warriors recovered to win 3 of their next 5 games before Witt badly damaged his hip while attempting a penalty goal against the Canberra Raiders which sidelined him for the next four games. Witt struggled on his return and was dropped after two games, however the Warriors' mid season slump failed to be halted with new halves Nathan Fien and Grant Rovelli, and following a narrow loss to last placed South Sydney on which goalkicking was decisive, Witt returned for the Round 22 game against the Brisbane Broncos on which the team began a remarkable surge towards the semi-finals to finish in 8th position, setting up a sudden death Qualifying Final match against the Melbourne Storm at Olympic Park Stadium.

Few gave the eighth-placed Warriors much hope against the minor premiers, especially as no eighth team had ever beaten first since the McIntyre system was introduced in 1999. However the Warriors fought all the way, and with just minutes remaining only trailed 14–15. Suddenly Manu Vatuvei made a break down field, finding Witt in support who taunted the Melbourne defenders by waving the ball in the air before placing it down to give the Warriors a shock 18–15 win. The Warriors backed the win up with a comfortable 30–13 win over the Sydney Roosters in the semi-final at Mount Smart Stadium before being eliminated 32-6 by Manly in the Preliminary Final at the Sydney Football Stadium.

In 2009 Witt was expected to face competition for the Five-eighth spot from new signing Joel Moon. The Warriors strangely told him that they didn't expect to use him in 2009, and he would instead he probably spend the season playing in the NSW Cup for the Auckland Vulcans. This led Witt to look for a new club and he was linked with the Penrith Panthers and Melbourne Storm before he finally decided to switch codes.

=== Rugby union ===
In March 2009 Witt switched to rugby union, signing with the New Zealand Rugby Union and the Otago Rugby Union. He played in the Air New Zealand Cup in 2009 . Witt has said he aims to playing international rugby for the All Blacks.

Witt played for the Taieri Eels in Dunedin Club Competition before making the Otago squad. He made his début for Otago in a July pre-season match. He went on to play seven games in the Air New Zealand Cup, six of them from the bench, and kicked one penalty goal.

=== St George Illawarra Dragons ===
In December 2009 it was announced that Witt had decided to return to rugby league, signing with Wales-based Super League club Crusaders. On 29 January, Witt scored Crusaders first points of 2010, and the first points of 2010's Super League XV with a penalty kick in their 34–6 loss to Leeds Rhinos. Midway through the Super League season, Witt was considered a top contender for player of the year. However, his season was cut short by an injury to his knee. On 30 June 2011, Witt signed a new 3-year deal keeping him at Crusaders until the end of the 2014 season. However, following the demise of the Crusaders, Witt joined the London Broncos, starting in 2012. Witt signed with the St. George Illawarra Dragons for 2014. He played the first 4 games before being injured. By the time he returned, the Dragons had signed Benji Marshall and Witt did not play another game. He retired at the end of the season.

== Modelling and charity work ==
Michael Witt
- Years active: 2005–present
- Known for: Gods of Football (Glamour photography)
- Modeling information
- Height: 180 cm (5 ft 11 in)
- Hair color: Brown
- Eye color: Blue
- Agency: Distinct

Witt's boy next door good looks have seen him appear in various rugby league charity calendars and magazines. In late 2005, Witt was photographed at the Radisson Kestrel Hotel, Manly (now the Manly Sebel) for the League Of Their Own 2006 calendar that was produced in the style of the famous Dieux du Stade calendars to raise money for the Koori Kids foundation, and following this Witt was included in Cosmopolitan magazine's Boys With Balls '06 feature which profiled 20 of the sexiest footballers of the year from both the NRL and AFL competitions. He was also the male centrefold for the November 2006 issue of Cleo magazine, and was featured on the front cover of the Naked Rugby League 2007-08 charity calendar (and for February 2007) with proceeds from its sales going to the National Breast Cancer Foundation of Australia.

Witt was also a finalist in the 2007 Adidas Action 3 Sexiest Man in League competition, which was won by Manly fullback Brett Stewart following a public online and SMS vote, and was featured for January for the accompanying Sexiest Man In League 2008 calendar. In late 2008 Witt was photographed at the home of celebrity agent Max Markson in Dover Heights for inclusion in both the Rugby League and International editions of the Gods of Football calendars, a charity initiative to raise funds for the McGrath Foundation. Witt also appeared in the behind-the-scenes production DVD of the Gods of Football calendars which was released in February 2009.

Witt appeared on the cover and for a five-page story in the August 2011 issue of Attitude Active magazine.
