= Gemmyo =

French jewelry manufacturer

- Industry: Fashion
- Headquarters: Paris, France
- Key people: Pauline Laigneau; Charif Debsn
- Products: Bespoke Jewelry
- Website: www.gemmyo.com

Gemmyo is a French jewellery manufacturer founded in 2011 that specialises in bespoke designs.

== History ==
Pauline Laigneau and Charif Debs, graduates of HEC Paris and Harvard respectively, created the made-to-order jewelry company in 2011.

Originally, the company operated entirely online. Its website's users could choose the type of product, the material and the stone or design their piece with the company's consultants.

The direct-to-consumer company's early stage investors included Justin Ziegler andFrançois Rousseau. The French venture capital firm Alven Capital led a second funding round. Its advertising campaign featured a pink kitten.

The company operated out of an apartment in Paris' 10th arrondissement and grew to an annual turnover of €3 million in 2014,

following a poster campaign on Paris' metro. By 2015, it employed seventeen people with the Parisian newspaper Le Monde describing them as,

"a young startup with strong potential, which is betting on high-tech technology."

- Le Monde

In the spring of 2017, it announced plans to open more physical stores after testing the viability of physical retail with its first location on the Rue de Seine in Paris' sixth arrondissement.

The company reported a 30% increase in sales during the COVID-19 pandemic and a €1M operating revenue for 2020.

It opened showrooms in Paris and Lyon in 2015 and 2017, respectively. It diverged from its built-to-order-only model when its first pop-up store at Printemps launched in 2022. The opening coincided with the launch of its fine jewellery lines intended to encourage seasonal impulse purchases.

In 2024, it appointed former Richemont Group employee Sophie Garric as its CEO and opened a shop in Tokyo, Japan, following a six-month residency at the Okura.

In 2025, it moved its Saint-Germain-des-Prés boutique to 74 Rue de Seine, Paris.
