= Caribbean's Next Top Model season 1 =

Caribbean's Next Top Model
- Season 1
- No. of episodes: 11

Release
- Original network: CaribVision
- Original release: February 18 – May 20, 2013

Season chronology
- Next → Season 2

The first season of Caribbean's Next Top Model, a Caribbean reality television show, premiered on February 18, 2013. It features a number of aspiring models from the entire Caribbean region, who compete for a chance to begin their career in the modelling industry.

On November 15, 2012, the contestants of the first season were revealed. For reasons not specified, the show stopped airing temporarily after episode 8. The season resumed with the last three episodes of the series, beginning with episode 9, under its regular schedule on May 20, 2013.

The winner of the competition was 22-year-old Treveen Stewart from the Cayman Islands. As her prizes, she received a $50,000 spokesperson contract with B Mobile, a modeling contract with Factor Women, as well as an appearance on the cover and an accompanying spread in Caribbean Belle magazine.

== Contestants ==
(ages stated are at start of contest)

Country	Contestant	Age	Finish	Place
Trinidad and Tobago	Rachel John	20	Episode 2	12 (quit)
Trinidad and Tobago	Semoy De Four	22	Episode 2	11
Guadeloupe	Ashley Anselm	19	Episode 3	10
Trinidad and Tobago	Sheriza Ali	23	Episode 4	9
The Bahamas	Kendra Beneby	23	Episode 5	8
Jamaica	Lisa Wallace	26	Episode 6	7
Barbados	Sedia Jackman	19	Episode 6	6
Trinidad and Tobago	Athaliah Samuel	23	Episode 7	5
Jamaica	Trudy-Lee Collins	21	Episode 8	4-3
Trinidad and Tobago	Susan Chin	23	Episode 8	4-3
Curaçao	Stephany Francisca	22	Episode 10	2
Cayman Islands	Treveen Stewart	22	Episode 10	1

== Episodes ==
=== Episode 1 ===
First aired February 18, 2013

- Eliminated: Anna-Rosa Banfield, Candace Skeete, Davia Chambers, Jenelle Hollingsworth, Julianna James, Kim-Marrie Alexander, Lisa Wallace, Maranda John-Smart, Ornella Bynoe, Tinnitia Griffith, Treicy Forchue & Xiea Hull

=== Episode 2 ===
First aired February 25, 2013

In the second episode of Caribbean's Next Top Model, viewers witnessed an unexpected twist as Rachel opted to leave the competition. She was substituted by Jamaican Lisa Wallace.

- Quit: Rachel John
- Replacement: Lisa Wallace

The contestants learned that they would be competing in a military themed 'model' bootcamp. For the first challenge, CNTM judge Richard Young announced that there would be a 'pose off'. At Young's demand, the 11 finalists squared off to pose as 'dancehall queens', 'it girls' and 'business executives'. In the end, Sedia won the challenge for best 'femme fatale' pose, as well as a call home curtesy of Bmobile.

- Reward challenge winner: Sedia Jackman

Back at bootcamp, emotions ran wild with Sheriza getting picked on and Semoy feeling homesick. As the competition continued, Helen Pipins, creative director, introduced the models to their next challenge – a pose off photo shoot in pairs photographed by David Wears at the Chaguaramas Military Museum in Trinidad.

Later, at the judges table, Trudy won the photo shoot challenge for her strong poses and fluid movement. In addition, Semoy was eliminated as the judges felt she didn't want to be there.

- First call-out: Trudy-Lee Collins
- Bottom two: Lisa Wallace & Semoy De Four
- Eliminated: Semoy De Four

=== Episode 3 ===
First aired March 4, 2013

This week on Caribbean's Next Top Model, the competition began as the ten finalists met up with Crystal Cunningham (the face of Chi) and guest judge and fashion designer, Sparrow, who introduced the girls to their first personal style challenge. With the help of Chi products, the girls were given ten minutes to put a look together that best conveyed their individual fashion. Although some of the models were spot on, Lisa won for her portrayal of 'punk' style.

- Reward challenge winner: Lisa Wallace

Next, it was makeover time! In the third episode, the model hopefuls endured extreme cuts, edgy hair colouring, dramatic blow outs and unveiled their new looks, all courtesy of the Chi salon in Trinidad. After seeing their new hairstyles for the first time, some of the girls like Sedia loved their new looks, while others like Treveen and Trudy had a hard time with a serious lack of locks. Ultimately, everyone got a chance to show off their new do's in a photo shoot. The result – a group of girls one step closer to being a Top Model!

Later, the contestants met with the judges for the deliberation of the "Wake Up, No Makeup" challenge. Although Treveen was having trouble accepting her new transformation, her determination to rock her new look paid off as the judges first pick. In the end, Wendy called Ashley and Kendra forward as the two bottom finalists. The judges felt that Kendra needed to become more comfortable with her make over and decided to give her a chance to improve, while Ashley was eliminated for her lack of versatility.

- First call-out: Treveen Stewart
- Bottom two: Ashley Anselm & Kendra Beneby
- Eliminated: Ashley Anselm

=== Episode 4 ===
First aired March 11, 2013

In the fourth episode of Caribbean's Next Top Model the girls were warned that this week, they'd have to put their best foot forward. In the first challenge, the model hopefuls were given the chance to show off their best catwalk with runway expert Murrien Mitchell, and guest judge and model, Dominique Armorer. After a little coaching, the girls were given the task of walking the runway and staying focused and fierce. In the end, Kendra won the challenge – a great comeback after being in the bottom two during the last elimination.

- Reward challenge winner: Kendra Beneby

Back at their new model apartment, moods were tested as Athaliah's aggressive personality began to become somewhat troublesome for the other girls. Also, the idea of being far away from loved ones back home was beginning to take a toll on Sheriza, as she confessed to holding back during the competition.

All drama aside, next it was time for the Carnival themed photo shoot. At the following challenge, Helen Pipins, creative director and judge greeted the finalists and introduced them to photographer, Kerron Riley, and Monique Nobrega, the Creative Director of Tribe. The girls were instructed to use tactics from the first challenge to focus while also capturing the spirit of Carnival while dressed in the elaborate costumery by Tribe.

Model	Carvinal Character
Athaliah	Warrior Princess of the Ezumi Clan
Kendra	The Spirit of Thailand
Lisa	The Spirit of South Beach
Sedia	The Spirit of Ibiza
Sheriza	The Spirit of Cancun
Stephany	Roman Warrior
Susan	The Spirit of Santorini
Treveen	The Spirit of Las Vegas
Trudy-Lee	Calypso

At deliberation, the judges went through the final shots and commented on the girls poise and conviction. Treveen was once again chosen as the judges top pick for her amazing image and great interaction with the camera. In the bottom two, Kendra was called forth once again for not being conscious of her posing while Sheriza was sent home because the judges felt that she was removed and not comfortable in her challenges.

- First call-out: Treveen Stewart
- Bottom two: Kendra Beneby & Sheriza Ali
- Eliminated: Sheriza Ali

=== Episode 5 ===
First aired March 18, 2013

This week comfort levels were tested to an extreme. To begin, the model hopefuls were given the chance to find their center with the help of guest judge and yogi Rachel Guillen in preparation for the episode activities. Later, Pedro Virgil introduced the girls to their first challenge – a track race up Lady Chancellor Hill to a photo shoot; where the contestants would have to line up for an impromptu photo shoot challenge featuring Blue Waters taken within five frames. Although Lisa won the race, Pedro chose Treveen as the challenge winner for her zen-like poses.

- Reward challenge winner: Treveen Stewart

Back at the model apartment, conflicts continued to brew between Athaliah and Lisa. Treveen took center stage again as rumors built on suspicion of her body defects began to circulate.

At the final challenge Helen Pipins and guest photographer, Marvin Bartley, led the girls to bare their all in a nude photo shoot. At deliberation, the judges went through the contestants final images to choose their "magnificent 7" and commented that overall, it was a strong week for the girls. Stephany was chosen as the finalist with the best photo imagery and composition, but only seven could continue. For the third time in a row, Kendra was left in the bottom two along with Susan. Both were critiqued for a lack of consistency and for Kendra, her chances were up and she was sent home.

- First call-out: Stephany Francisca
- Bottom two: Kendra Beneby & Susan Chin
- Eliminated: Kendra Beneby

=== Episode 6 ===
First aired March 25, 2013

The competition began as the girls met up with stylist, fashion designer and image consultant, Peter Elias, who informed them that they would be going on their first go-sees equipped with a map and a Samsung Galaxy tab, courtesy of Bmobile. The finalists met with Trinidad and Tobago's premiere fashion designers Nigel Eastman, Heather Jones, Shaun Griffith-Perez and Kaj, and gave their best impressions to gain all of the designers' favour. As the girls returned to the model apartment, they were met by celebrity judge, Wendy Fitzwilliam and Elias, who shocked them with a surprise elimination. Lisa was sent home for not creating a lasting impression with the designer.

- Reward challenge winner: Stephany Francisca
- Eliminated outside of judging panel: Lisa Wallace

The remaining Top Model hopefuls were off to their photo shoot challenge with Helen Pipins, photographer – Calvin French, and some gorgeous male models. The theme throughout the shoot was Amerindian influenced and French made sure to intimidate the girls to evoke the indigenous people of the Caribbean.

At deliberation, the competition was tough as Wendy commented that everyone had made considerable growth in the competition. However, only five of the finalists could continue on to compete to be on top. The judges chose Trudy-Lee as the best photo of the week and Sedia and Stephany were the bottom two. For Sedia, the judges felt that there was inconsistency in her images and in Stephany's case, there was a consensus that it looked like she was trying too hard to pose in her photos. Sedia was eliminated and left everyone with a final bow and good-bye.

- First call-out: Trudy-Lee Collins
- Bottom two: Sedia Jackman & Stephany Francisca
- Eliminated: Sedia Jackman

=== Episode 7 ===
First aired April 1, 2013

The competition began as the finalists were introduced to the art of acting. With the help of guest judge, actor and music producer, Bryce Wilson, their first challenge forced the girls to act outside of the box. The contestants were given the chance to do a character study and try their best to play their roles. Some of the girls had trouble with the exercise and others, like Athaliah, managed to be surprisingly convincing. Ultimately, Treveen won the challenge for nailing the character of a vulnerable person in love.

- Reward challenge winner: Treveen Stewart

Back at the model apartment, emotions continued to run wild. As the competition's effect on the girls' morale impacts their performance, the model hopefuls are finding out that their friendships with each other can be both fragile and temporary.

Later, the finalists met up with Helen Pipins who informed the girls that their final challenge would involve acting on a live commercial set for CHI Ceramic Nail Lacquer directed by Danielle Dieffenthaller. For this task, the models would have to utilize their experience with Wilson and be convincing and inspiring as ambassadors for CHI's brand. They also had to memorize and recite a script that would prove to be more difficult than the girls had anticipated.

At deliberation the judges reviewed the final takes of each model hopeful's CHI commercial. Stephany was chosen as the best commercial of the week because overall, she was the most comfortable with her script. In the end, Athaliah and Susan were selected for the bottom two. For Susan, the judges felt that although her walk on commercial was great, her acting continued to go downhill. In Athaliah's case, her personality seemed to disappear on camera and as a result, she was sent home.

- First call-out: Stephany Francisca
- Bottom two: Athaliah Samuel & Susan Chin
- Eliminated: Athaliah Samuel

=== Episode 8 ===
First aired April 8, 2013

Episode 8 begins and packed with shock and awe, forcing the finalists to "be on top of their game". For the first challenge, the girls put their fashion knowledge to the test with surprise guest and America's Next Top Model season 9 and season 17 alum, Bianca Golden, along with guest judge and style guru, Freddie Leiba. Clad in school uniforms and sitting at desks, class was in full session as the model hopefuls competed to be the smartest fashion student.

Although Susan won the challenge, her sense of victory was short-lived after Treveen voiced harsh comments about Susan's performance during the competition. Despite being visibly upset, she resolved not to let it affect her after speaking with Golden, who stopped by the model apartment to give the girls some sound advice.

- Reward challenge winner: Susan Chin

For the final challenge, the finalists met up with creative director, Helen Pipins, and photographer and judge, Pedro Virgil, for a photo shoot amidst the Hanuman Murti. The model hopefuls were instructed to channel their devotion to winning the competition and evoke "posture, poise and personal growth" while wearing garments by the House of Jaipur. Although Susan was given help by celebrity judge, Wendy, during the shoot, she made it clear that "this truly is anybody's game".

Back at deliberation, the judges went through the final four's photos from the challenge. Although the judges remarked that the elimination would be tough, they were forced to make a determination based on the girls' progress overall. Treveen was chosen for the best photo of the week while Susan and Trudy-Lee were called forward in the bottom two. In Susan's instance, Wendy felt that her photos were strong, but still lacked more expression. In Trudy-Lee's case, the consensus was that she was very graceful, but lacked consistently strong poses throughout photo shoots.

In the most unexpected and shocking turn of events CNTM has seen yet, both Susan and Trudy-Lee were eliminated.

- First call-out: Treveen Stewart
- Bottom two: Susan Chin & Trudy-Lee Collins
- Eliminated: Susan Chin & Trudy-Lee Collins

=== Episode 9 ===
First aired May 20, 2013

The battle began as 23 chosen finalists set foot in Trinidad and Tobago for their first challenge to promote AIDS awareness. As 23 quickly dwindled down to 11, viewers were introduced to the beautiful model hopefuls from around the Caribbean. From military themed challenges with pose offs, to makeovers sponsored by CHI and Amerindian themed photo shoots where the girls dared to bare their all, the girls tried their best to prove they have what it takes to be on top.

Throughout the episode, recaps of the tension between the finalists took center stage as it was displayed that Lisa, Athaliah and Treveen were oftentimes culprits of drama in the house. In never before seen outtakes, CNTM showed that there was never a dull moment with the girls. From putting up with gross shower amenities during boot camp, to crazy bets after challenges, the excitement never stopped.

Now, despite surprise eliminations and clashing personalities, two girls remain to embark upon the final challenges of the season. Stephany, the leggy beauty from Curaçao, is determined to let her elegance and confidence take her to the end. Meanwhile, Treveen, the Caymanian who dreams of being a supermodel, is prepared to let her personality land her the grand prize.

=== Episode 10 ===
First aired May 27, 2013

- Final Two: Stephany Francisca & Treveen Stewart
- Caribbean's Next Top Model: Treveen Stewart

== Summaries ==
=== Call-out order ===
Order	Episodes							
Order	2	3	4	5	6	7	8	10
1	Trudy-Lee	Treveen	Treveen	Stephany	Trudy-Lee	Stephany	Treveen	Treveen
2	Sedia	Susan	Susan	Sedia	Susan	Trudy-Lee	Stephany	Stephany
3	Treveen	Trudy-Lee	Lisa	Athaliah	Treveen	Treveen	Susan; Trudy-Lee	
4	Stephany	Sedia	Stephany	Lisa	Athaliah	Susan	Susan; Trudy-Lee	
5	Ashley	Lisa	Trudy-Lee	Treveen	Stephany	Athaliah		
6	Athaliah	Sheriza	Athaliah	Trudy-Lee	Sedia			
7	Susan	Athaliah	Sedia	Susan	Lisa			
8	Sheriza	Stephany	Kendra	Kendra				
9	Kendra	Kendra	Sheriza					
10	Lisa	Ashley						
11	Semoy							
12	Rachel							

The contestant was eliminated
The contestant was eliminated outside of the judging panel
The contestant won the competition

- Episode 1 was the casting episode. There was no actual call-out that first week. Instead, the models each found their photos in an envelope with their luggage. Those with 'denied' stamps inside their envelopes were eliminated from the competition.
- In episode 2, Rachel decided to quit the competition. Lisa entered the competition as her replacement
- In episode 6, Lisa was eliminated outside of judging panel for performing the worst in the challenge.
- In episode 8, Susan and Trudy-Lee landed in the bottom-two. Both of them were eliminated.
- Episode 9 was the recap episode.
- Episode 11 was the reunion episode.

=== Bottom two ===
Episode	Contestants			Eliminated
2	Lisa	&	Semoy	Semoy
3	Ashley	&	Kendra	Ashley
4	Kendra	&	Sheriza	Sheriza
5	Kendra	&	Susan	Kendra
6	Sedia	&	Stephany	Lisa
6	Sedia	&	Stephany	Sedia
7	Athaliah	&	Susan	Athaliah
8	Susan	&	Trudy-Lee	Trudy-Lee
8	Susan	&	Trudy-Lee	Susan
10	Stephany	&	Treveen	Stephany

The contestant was eliminated after her first time in the bottom two
The contestant was eliminated after her third time in the bottom two
The contestant was eliminated outside of judging panel
The contestant was eliminated in the final judging and placed as the runner-up

=== Photo shoot guide ===
- Episode 1 photo shoot: Polaroids (casting)
- Episode 2 photo shoot: Military soldiers in groups
- Episode 3 photo shoot: Natural beauty shots
- Episode 4 photo shoot: Carnival chaos
- Episode 5 photo shoot: Nude & natural beauty
- Episode 6 photo shoot: Body paint in the jungle
- Episode 7 commercial: CHI Ceramic Nail Lacquer
- Episode 8 photo shoot: Amidst the Hanuman Murti in a temple
- Episode 10 commercial & photo shoot: B Mobile advertisements
