= Kerryne James =

Grenadian politician (born 1997)

Kerryne Zennelle James (born 27 October 1997) is a Grenadian politician from the National Democratic Congress from the currently serving as MP for St. John.

== Early career ==
In 2018, she was a contestant on season 4 of Caribbean's Next Top Model.

== Political career ==
James was elected in the 2022 Grenadian general election at the age of 24 becoming the country's youngest ever legislator.

She was immediately appointed Minister of Climate Resilience, Environment and Renewable Energy in the Cabinet of Grenada. She later attended the 2022 United Nations Climate Change Conference in Sharm El Sheikh.
