= Firefighter calendar =

Decorative calendar that features images of shirtless men

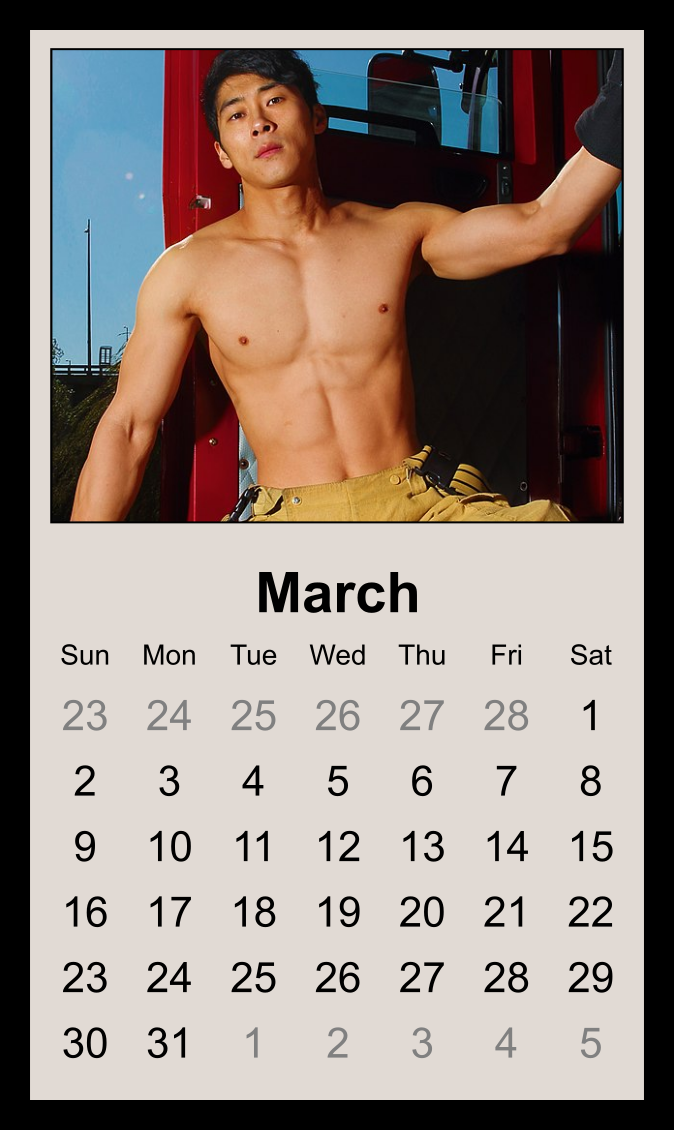
An example of a page in a firefighter calendar

Firefighter calendars are a type of decorative calendar that feature images of shirtless or scantily dressed muscular men depicted as firefighters. They are typically marketed towards heterosexual women and are often created by fire departments to raise money for charity.

== History ==
The precursor to firefighter calendars were physique magazines, also known as beefcake magazines, which rose to popularity in the 1940s. These magazines depicted muscular men in minimal or no clothing performing poses. Physique magazines represented a shift in magazine culture from celebrity models to blue-collar models, such as firefighters, which would influence later decorative calendars. When pornography grew in popularity in the United States in the 1960s and 1970s, particularly after Manual Enterprises, Inc. v. Day made images of male full-frontal nudity legal, heterosexual women began to be targeted as consumers of male-focused erotica, which gave way to female-targeted calendars.

Decorative calendars featuring muscular men began to rise in popularity in the 1980s, and calendars depicting firefighters became ubiquitous. While some are created purely for profit, most use proceeds to raise money for charity. In the 2010s and 2020s, firefighter calendars began to feature both male and female firefighters.

In the 21st century, firefighter calendars have become popular in Asia, particularly Taiwan. In 2018, the Taiwanese government invited two models from the Australian Firefighter Calendar to visit a travel expo and gave out over 10,000 calendars. The Australian models are considered celebrities in Taiwan, and their visits attract considerable media attention.

Calendars that feature muscular men regardless of profession are collectively called "beefcake calendars". Other types of beefcake calendars include those featuring college students, police officers, and Latino models.

== See also ==
- Nude calendar
- Pin-up model
