= Naked Rugby League =

Charity fundraising calendar

Cover of Naked Rugby League 2007-2008 Calendar

Naked Rugby League is a nude calendar featuring black-and-white photographs of professional rugby league footballers from Australasia's National Rugby League competition.

Released in October 2006, the 2007–2008 calendar spanned 14 months from January 2007 to February 2008. It was produced in the same erotic style as French rugby's annual Dieux du Stade calendars with the players being photographed nude separately in various locations, both indoors and outdoors. The photos were taken by the Australian celebrity photographer Pedro Virgil.

The calendar was released in a general black-and-white edition and a limited colour edition. The calendar was not officially sanctioned by the National Rugby League.

Proceeds from its sales were donated to benefit the National Breast Cancer Foundation of Australia.

Naked Rugby League was a follow-up to the 2006 League of Their Own calendar.

== Participants ==
The calendar featured ten of the twelve players from the 2006 League Of Their Own calendar. The same or similar photos were used for the ten players. Brad Tighe and Ryan McGoldrick from League of Their Own were replaced with three new players: Greg Bird, Brent Webb and Paul Whatuira. The fourth, an unidentified player, was photographed from behind.

The following players were featured:

- January 2007: Paul Whatuira (Wests Tigers)
- February 2007: Michael Witt (Manly-Warringah Sea Eagles)
- March 2007: Ashley Harrison (South Sydney Rabbitohs)
- April 2007: Riley Brown (Newcastle Knights)
- May 2007: Amos Roberts (Sydney Roosters)
- June 2007: Nick Youngquest (St George Illawarra Dragons)
- July 2007: Johnathan Thurston (North Queensland Cowboys)
- August 2007: Brent Webb (New Zealand Warriors)
- September 2007: Ben Ross (Penrith Panthers)
- October 2007: Stuart Webb (Sydney Roosters)
- November 2007: Liam Fulton (Wests Tigers)
- December 2007: Greg Bird (Cronulla-Sutherland Sharks)
- January 2008: Justin Hodges (Brisbane Broncos)
- February 2008: An unknown player, photographed from behind

== Reactions ==
Immediately after publication of the calendar, the National Rugby League was quick to distance itself from the project. "We don't have an issue with the players having got their gear off, but what we want known is the NRL is not associated with the calendar", NRL chief operating officer Graham Annesley told Australia's Sydney Confidential. Anneseley particularly criticized Nick Youngquest of the St. George Illawarra Dragons for his photograph (the calendar's June 2007 image) saying that "Youngquest had taken the idea 'too far'. He may not have known that he was in that, ah, position, but it's just something we feel the publishers went too far with". About the charitable cause the calendar served, Anneseley responded: "We have a very close association with the National Breast Cancer Foundation... but the nature of the publication is not anything that we would have approved to be associated with the NRL."

A National Breast Cancer Foundation spokeswoman said the organisation was not behind the actual production of the calendar, but confirmed it would benefit from its sale.

Youngquest responded that he knew what he was doing at the time but did it for a charitable cause with the proceeds going to breast cancer research. He commented: "The photographer [Pedro Virgil] rang and said the best photo he had was a bit revealing and asked me if I minded. I said I didn't mind. It's all for a good cause." This wasn't Youngquest's first nude calendar and the player was regularly voted as top of the most attractive player polls. Youngquest continued: "It is for breast cancer, so if it affects my image, I would be pretty disappointed by it. I don't think anyone would be that shallow to let that happen. The photo is for a good cause, so, if it stirs any controversy, so be it."

The Australian celebrity photographer Pedro Virgil who had taken the photos of the players defended his work saying about the calendar: "It is provocative in the sense that the guys are naked... but in this case it is tasteful".
