= Geoffroy Messina =

- Born: Geoffroy Messina; 29 May 1982 (age 44) La Tronche, France
- Height: 1.89 m (6 ft 2 in)
- Weight: 86 kg (13 st 8 lb)

Rugby union career
- Position: Centre
- Current team: Toulon
Senior career
Years	Team	Apps	(Points)
2001-2002	FC Grenoble		
2002-2005	ASM Clermont		
2005-2010	Stade Français		
2010-Present	Toulon		

Geoffroy Messina is a French rugby union footballer, born on 29 May 1982 in La Tronche, Isère. He currently plays in the centre position. Messina started his career with FC Grenoble in 2001, and stayed with them for 2 years. At the end of 2002, he changed teams to play for ASM Clermont, where he stayed until 2005. Since then, he has played for Stade Français Paris. Messina earned the title of Champion de France 2007. Messina also models on the side. He has appeared in the popular Dieux du Stade calendar since 2005.
