= Caribbean's Next Top Model =

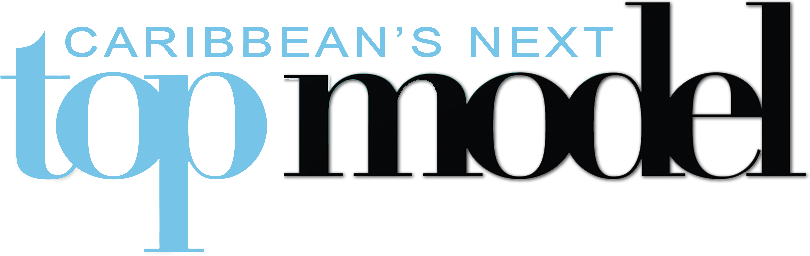
- Caribbean's Next Top Model show logo
- Created by: Tyra Banks
- Judges: Wendy Fitzwilliam; Socrates McKinney; Pedro Virgil; Richard Young
- Opening theme: Machel Montano - "So High"
- Countries of origin: Trinidad and Tobago
- Original language: English
- No. of seasons: 4
- No. of episodes: 33

Production
- Running time: 41-43 min.

Original release
- Network: CaribVision (2013); Flow TV (2015)
- Release: 18 February 2013 – 25 April 2018

Caribbean's Next Top Model (also referred to as CarribeNTM) is a reality television competition set in the Caribbean, adapted from America's Next Top Model. The show features a group of young aspiring models, from across the Caribbean, compete for the title of Caribbean's Next Top Model and a chance to commence their career in the modeling industry. Each season is set on a different country as the competition itself makes its way across the Caribbean.

Former Miss Universe, Wendy Fitzwilliam hosts the series accompanied by her fellow judges, International Photographer Pedro Virgil and Caribbean Fashion Expert Socrates McKinney. Twenty-three (23) finalists from across the Caribbean (Barbados, Bahamas, Curaçao, Guadeloupe, Dominican Republic, Jamaica, Cayman Islands, Antigua & Barbuda, Trinidad and Tobago, St. Lucia, Dominica, Guyana, Puerto Rico) compete in an array of challenges to become the next top model.

Featured guests appearing throughout the show include international photographer Matthew Jordan Smith; stylist and fashion expert Freddie Leiba; international models Lene Hall and Teresa Lourenco; music producer Bryce Wilson; fashion designer Claudia Pegus; former NFL player Quentin Groves; Soca musician Machel Montano and international actress, dancer, choreographer and motion capture artist Dani Swan.

CaribeNTM aired across nearly 30 Caribbean territories during primetime programming from February to May 2013 and October-December 2015.

== Judges ==
Judges	Cycle			
Judges	1 (2013)	2 (2015)	3 (2017)	4 (2018)
Hosts
Wendy Fitzwilliam	Head Judge	Head Judge	Head Judge	Head Judge
Judging Panelists
Pedro Virgil	Main	Main	Main	Main
Richard Young	Main	Main		
Socrates McKinney			Main	Main

== Cycles ==
Cycle	Premiere date	Winner	Runner-up	Other contestants in order of elimination	Number of contestants	International Destinations
1 Trinidad and Tobago	18 February 2013	Treveen Stewart	Stephany Francisca	Rachel John (quit), Semoy De Four, Ashley Anselm, Sheriza Ali, Kendra Beneby, Lisa Wallace, Sedia Jackman, Athaliah Samuel, Trudy-Lee Collins & Susan Chin	12	St. Augustine
2 Barbados	19 October 2015	Kittisha Doyle	Linda Mejia Torres	Raquel Wijnerman & Carol-Ann King, Krissle Garcia, Mackella Moo-Young, Lia Ross, Yugge Farrell, Sydney Solomon, Ayana Jeune Whitehead & Nicoya Henry	11	None
3 Grenada	30 January 2017	Shamique Simms	Nkechi Vaughn & Samantha West	Nina Victor & Altena Wilson, Sashawna Flake & Zahada Harper, Iyepha Biggot, Chenise Cumberland & Lynah Bontiff, Tonisha Rock-Yaw, Tanisha Lalla, Nikita Maibaum, Lisa-Marie Faustin	14	None
4 Jamaica	14 February 2018	Le Shae Riley	Daphne Veldkamp	Kerryne James, Vanessa John, Trevine Sellier & Saskia Lewin & Kristina Robinson, Chimay Ramos, Usha Thomas, Ingrid Suarez, Natalie Whittington, Gabriella Bernard	12	None

== Contestants per country ==
Caribbean's Next Top Model contestants per country
Season	1	2	3	4
Antigua and Barbuda	—N/a	Nicoya Henry	—N/a	—N/a
Aruba	—N/a	—N/a	—N/a	Chimay Ramos
Bahamas	Kendra Beneby	—N/a	—N/a	Kristina Robinson
Barbados	Sedia Jackman	Carol-Ann King	Tonisha Rock-Yaw	—N/a
Cayman Islands	**Treveen Stewart**	Sydney Solomon	—N/a	—N/a
Curaçao	Stephany Francisca	—N/a	—N/a	—N/a
Dominica	—N/a	—N/a	Lynah Bontiff	—N/a
Grenada	—N/a	**Kittisha Doyle**	Nikita Maibaum; Zahada Harper	Usha Thomas; Kerryne James
Guadeloupe	Ashley Anselm	—N/a	—N/a	—N/a
Guyana	—N/a	—N/a	Nkechi Vaughn	—N/a
Jamaica	Trudy-Lee Collins; Lisa Wallace	Mackella Moo-Young	**Shamique Simms**; Chenise Cumberland; Sashawna Flake; Altena Wilson	Saskia Lewin
Panama	—N/a	—N/a	—N/a	Natalie Whittington; Ingrid Suarez
Puerto Rico	—N/a	Linda Mejia Torres	—N/a	—N/a
Saint Lucia	—N/a	Ayana Jeune Whitehead	Lisa-Marie Faustin	—N/a
Saint Vincent and the Grenadines	—N/a	Yugge Farrell	—N/a	—N/a
Sint Maarten	—N/a	—N/a	Nina Victor	—N/a
Suriname	—N/a	Raquel Wijnerman	—N/a	Daphne Veldkamp
Trinidad and Tobago	Susan Chin; Athaliah Samuel; Sheriza Ali; Semoy De Four; Rachel John	Lia Ross; Krissle Garcia	Samantha West; Tanisha Lalla; Iyepha Biggot	**Le Shae Riley**; Gabriella Bernard; Trevine Sellier; Vanessa John

The contestant in bold won in their respective season.
The contestant in italic placed as a runner-up in their respective season.
