= Pin-up model =

Model whose mass-produced pictures see wide appeal as popular culture

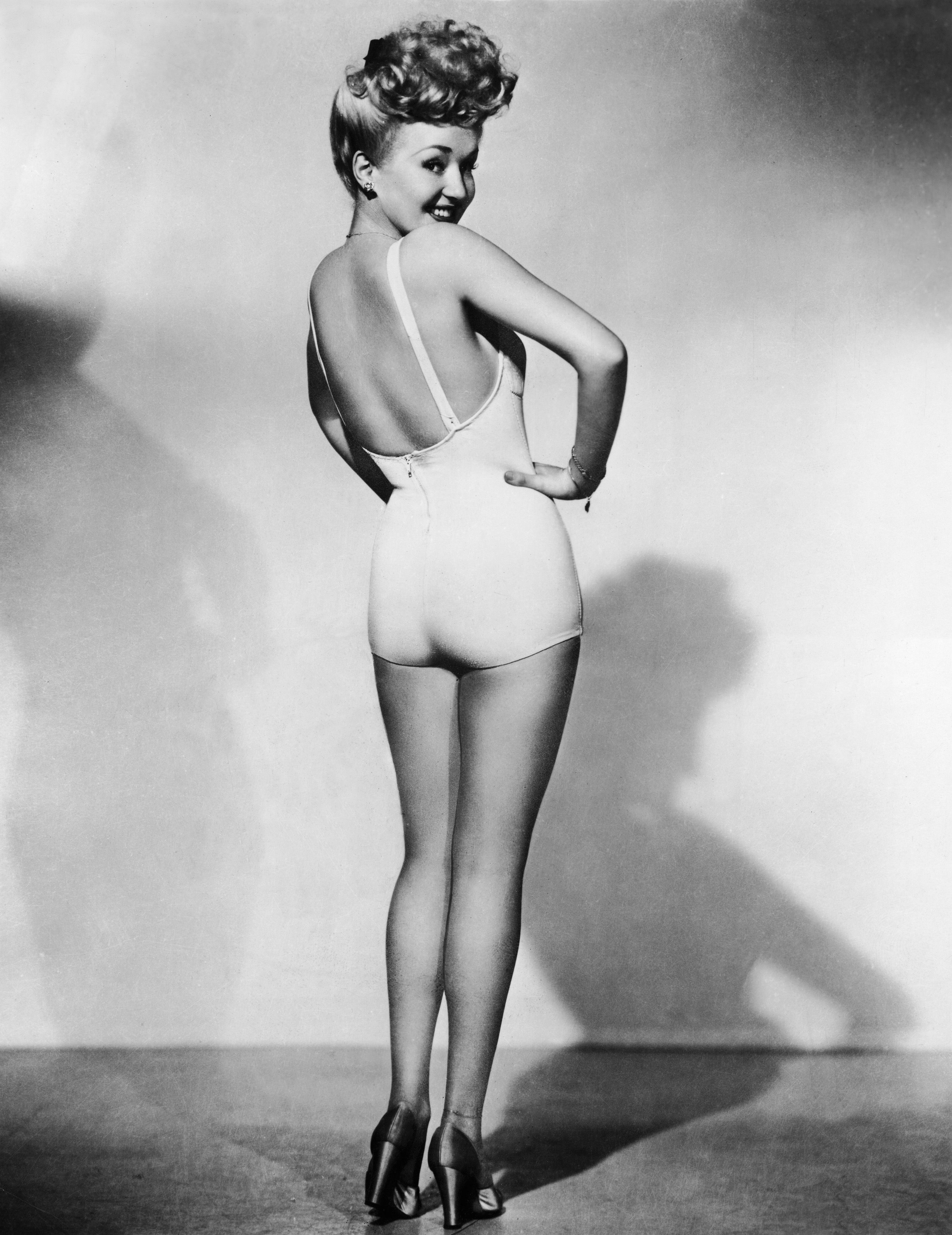
Betty Grable's famous pin-up photo from 1943

A pin-up model is a model whose mass-produced pictures and photographs have wide appeal within the popular culture of a society. Pin-up models are usually glamour, actresses, or fashion models whose pictures are intended for informal and aesthetic display, known for being pinned onto a wall. From the 1940s, pictures of pin-up girls were also known as cheesecake in the U.S.

The term pin-up refers to drawings, paintings, and photographs of semi-nude women and was first attested to in English in 1941. Images of pin-up girls were published in magazines and newspapers. They were also displayed on postcards, lithographs, and calendars. The counterpart of the pin-up girl is the male pin-up, also known as beefcake, including celebrated actors and athletes such as the actor James Dean, the singer Jim Morrison, and the model Fabio.

== History ==
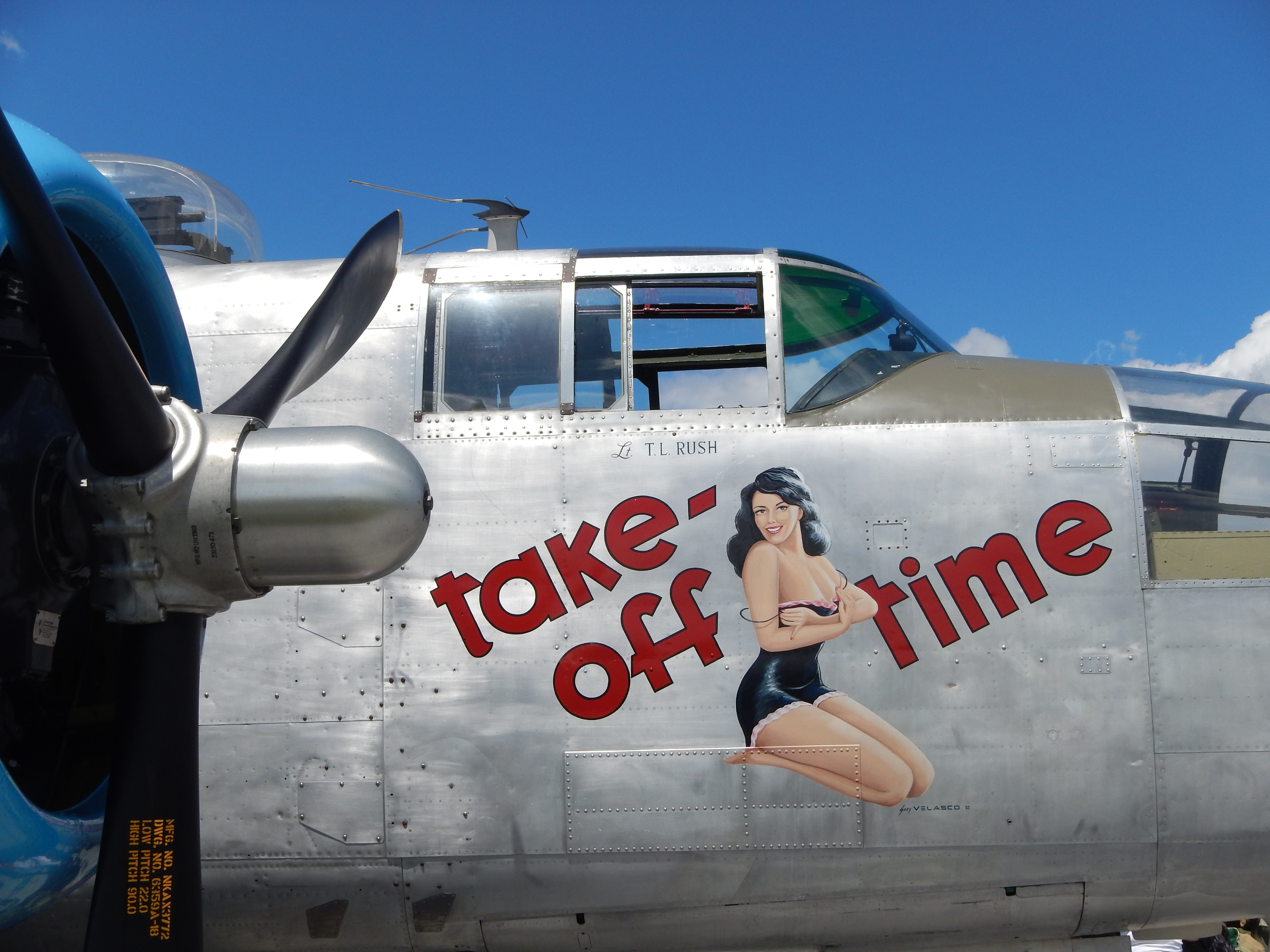
Pin-up girl nose art on the restored World War II B-25J aircraft Take-off Time

From the early 19th century, when pin-up modeling had "theatrical origins", burlesque performers and actresses sometimes used photographic business cards to advertise shows. These promotional and business cards could be found backstage in almost every theater's green room, pinned up or placed in "frames of the looking-glasses, in the joints of the gas-burners, and sometimes lying on top of the sacred cast-case itself." According to historian Maria Elena Buszek, "To understand both the complicated identity and the subversive nature of the 19th-century actress, one must also understand that the era's views on women's potential were inextricably tied to their sexuality, which in turn was tied to their level of visibility in the public sphere: regardless of race, class or background, it was generally assumed that the more public the woman, the more 'public,' or available, her sexuality." Famous actresses in early-20th-century film who were sexually fantasized were both drawn, photographed and put on posters to be sold for personal use. Among the celebrities who were considered sex symbols, one of the most popular early pin-up girls was Betty Grable, whose poster was ubiquitous in the lockers of G.I.s during World War II.

In Europe, prior to the First World War, the likes of "Miss Fernande" (who some identify as Fernande Barrey) were the world's first pin-ups in the modern sense. Miss Fernande displayed clear cleavage and full frontal nudity, and her pictures were popular among soldiers on both sides of the First World War.

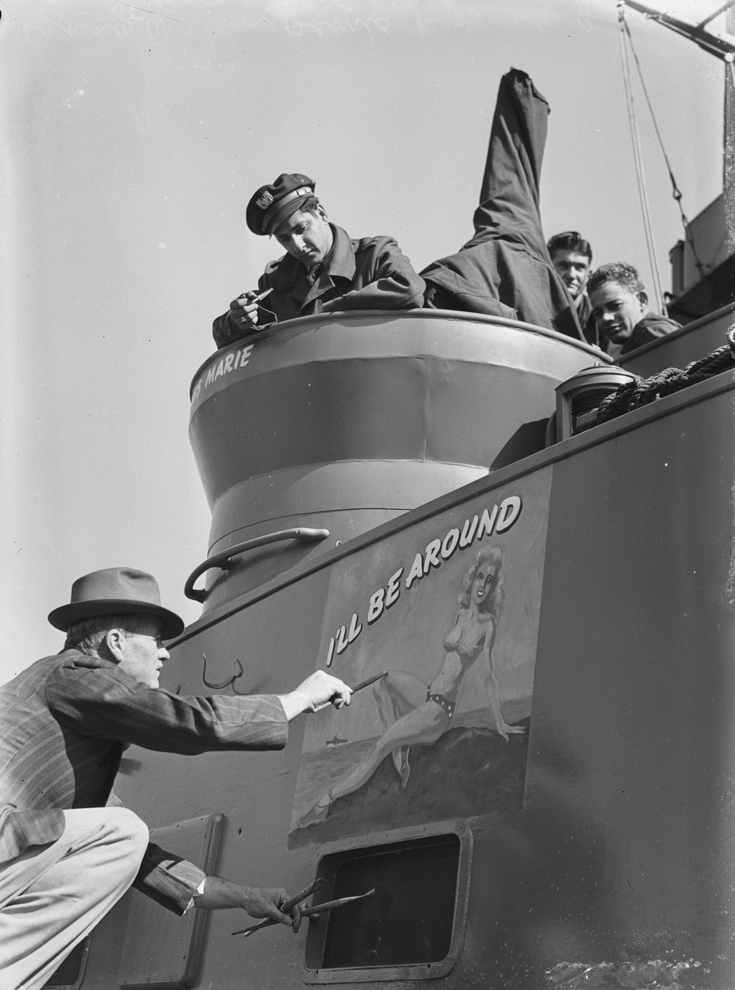
Harry Wann paints a "pin-up" girl on a PT boat, Australia, 1944.

Other pin-ups were artwork that depicted idealized versions of beautiful or attractive women. An early example of the latter type was the Gibson Girl, a representation of the New Woman drawn by Charles Dana Gibson. "Because the New Woman was symbolic of her new ideas about her sex, it was inevitable that she would also come to symbolize new ideas about sexuality." Unlike the photographed actresses and dancers generations earlier, art gave artists the freedom to draw women in many different ways. The men's magazine Esquire featured many drawings and "girlie" cartoons but was most famous for its "Vargas Girls". Prior to World War II, Vargas Girls were praised for their beauty and less focus was on their sexuality. However, during the war, the drawings transformed into women playing dress-up in military drag and drawn in seductive manners, like that of a child playing with a doll. Vargas Girls became so popular that from 1942 to 1946, owing to a high volume of military demand, "9 million copies of the magazine-without adverts and free of charge was sent to American troops stationed overseas and in domestic bases." The Vargas Girls were adapted as nose art on many World War II bomber and fighter aircraft; generally, they were not seen negatively or as prostitutes, but mostly as inspiring female patriots that were helpful for good luck.

Among the other well-known American artists specializing in the field were Earle K. Bergey, Enoch Bolles, Gil Elvgren, George Petty, Rolf Armstrong, Zoë Mozert, Duane Bryers, and Art Frahm. Notable contemporary pin-up artists include Olivia De Berardinis, known for her pin-up art of Bettie Page and her pieces in Playboy.

== Feminism and the pin-up ==
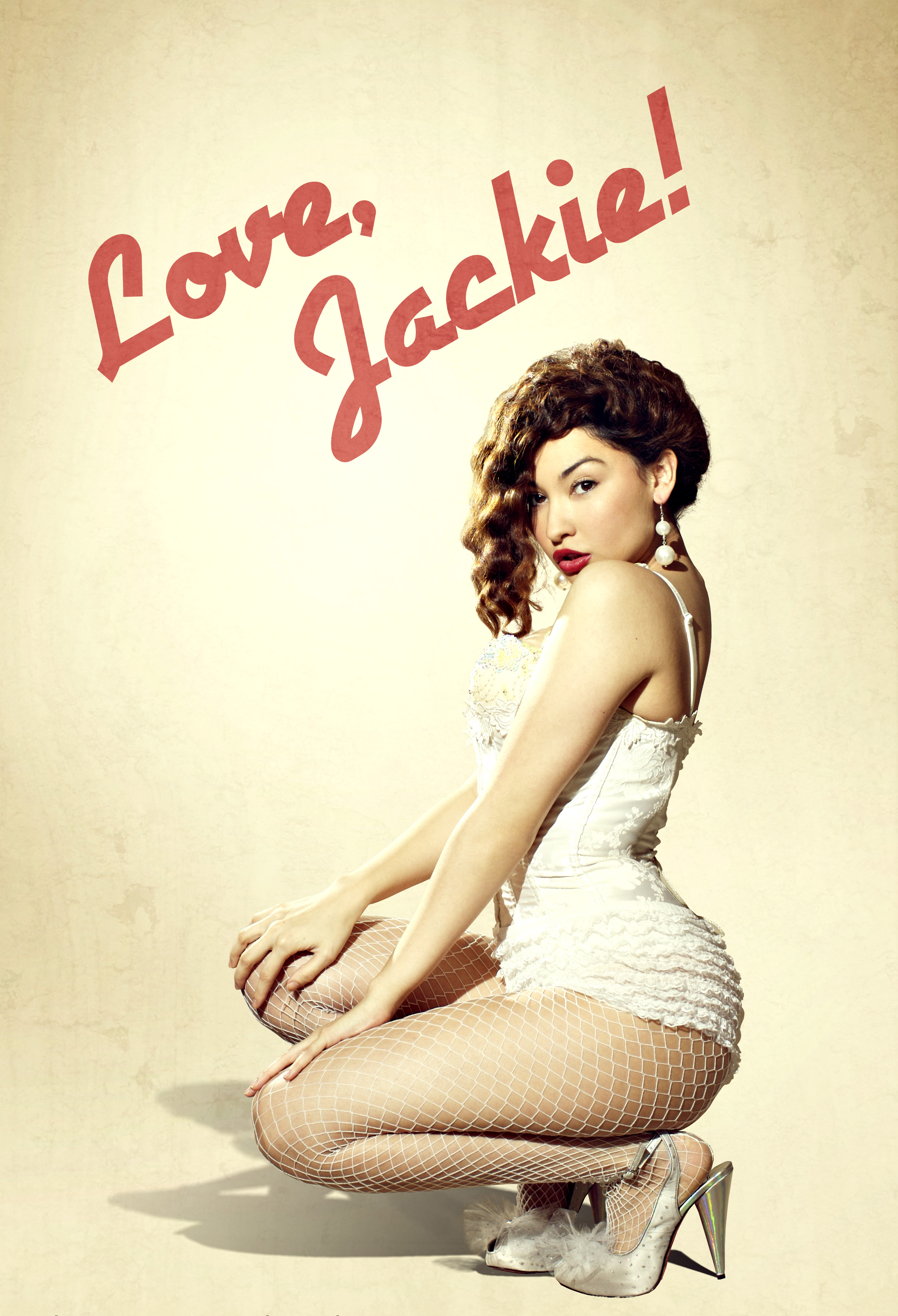
Pin-up photo of singer Jackie Martinez

Maria Buszek, the author of Pin-up Grrrls, said that the pin-up girl "has presented women with models for expressing and finding pleasure in their sexual subjectivity".

According to Joanne Meyerowitz in "Women, Cheesecake, and Borderline Material," an article in Journal of Women's History, "As sexual images of women multiplied in the popular culture, women participated actively in constructing arguments to endorse as well as protest [against] them."

As early as 1869, women have been supporters and opponents of the pin-up. Female supporters of early pin-up content considered these to be a "positive post-Victorian rejection of bodily shame and a healthy respect for female beauty."

Additionally, pin-up allows for women to change their everyday culture. The models "succeed in the feminist aim of changing the rigid, patriarchal terms."

It has been argued by some critics that in the early 20th century these drawings of women helped define certain body images—such as being clean, healthy, and wholesome—and were enjoyed by both men and women, and that as time progressed, these images changed from respectable to illicit.

Conversely, female protesters argued that these images were corrupting societal morality and saw these public sexual displays of women as lowering the standards of womanhood, destroying their dignity, reducing them to mere objects to pleasure men and therefore harmful to both women and young adolescents.

Pin-up modeling has been described as a subculture that is invested in promoting positive body images and a love for one's sexuality, "pin-up would also find ways to... encourage the erotic self-awareness and self expression of real women".

== Hair and makeup style ==
The classic style of the pin-up originates back from the 1940s. Due to the shortages of materials during World War II, the period of makeup is considered the "natural beauty" look. The U.S. was immersed in war-time economy, which put distribution restrictions on consumer goods. General rationing was supported; women applied mild amounts of products.

Pin-up style makeup products consisted of:

- Foundation: A cream base, liquid foundation that matched their natural skin tone
- Compact powders: used to set the foundation and even the overall complexion
- Eyes and brows: neutral contour on brow bone and lid. Eyebrows were shaped but kept full
- Eyeliner: the wing effect became popular by the 1950s
- Lashes: extended the barriers of the eye to appear slightly larger
- Blush: pastel and rose colors applied to the apple of the cheek
- Lips: vibrant red and matte color, applied to look plumper.

In the 1950s, the overall look consisted of the red lip and was often paired with rosy cheeks. Eyeliner became bold and began to be more commonly used to make the eye appear larger. Natural eyebrows were embraced, as opposed to the thin brows of the 1920s and '30s. In the 1940s, brows were shaped and clean but filled in with a pencil to appear fuller.

Lipstick "turned into a symbol of resilient femininity in the face of danger" and was seen as a way to boost morale during the war. The shape of the lip was also iconic of the 1940s. The lips were painted on to look plumper; a broad outline of the lip was added for roundness. This fuller look is known as the "Hunter's Bow", invented by Max Factor.

The pin curl is a staple of the pin-up style, as "women utilized pin curls for their main hair curling technique". Originating in the 1920s from the "water-waving technique", the hair style of the 1940s consisted of a fuller, gentle curl. The drying technique consists of curling a damp piece of hair, from the end to the root and pin in place. Once the curl is dry, it is brushed through to create the desired soft curl, with a voluminous silhouette.

Victory rolls are also a distinctive hairstyle of the pin-up. The Victory roll is curled inward and swept off the face and pinned into place on the top of the head. Soft curls, achieved through the pin curl technique, finish the look of pin-up.

As a makeup style, the classic pin-up underwent a revival in modern fashion. The red lip and winged eyeliner made a re-emergence in 2010.

== Pin-up in the contemporary age ==
Although pin-up modeling is associated with World War II and the 1950s, it developed into a subculture which can be seen represented in the styles of some celebrities and public figures. Pamela Anderson was considered the "perennial pin-up" due to decades' worth of modeling for Hugh Hefner's Playboy magazine. The American singer Lana Del Rey, whose style is comparable to that of the classic pin-up model, has performed a song called "Pin Up Galore". Beyoncé has recorded a song titled "Why Don't You Love Me," which pays tribute to the American pin-up queen of the 1950s, Bettie Page. The American burlesque performer Dita Von Teese is often referred to as a modern pin-up due to her involvement in the revival of American Burlesque, known as Neo-burlesque. Von Teese made an appearance in a biographical film about Bettie Page, Bettie Page Reveals All, where she helps to define pin-up. Katy Perry makes use of the ideas associated with pin-up modeling, and has included these in music videos and costumes. The Victoria's Secret Fashion Show can be comparable to burlesque show, whereas their yearly advent calendar can compare to pin-up in general.

The pin-up modeling subculture has produced magazines and forums dedicated to its community. Delicious Dolls, a magazine that began in 2011 has both a print and digital version. It was described in 2015 as "the most-liked" pin-up magazine in the world. One of the magazine's mission statements is "to promote and showcase retro and modern pin-up girls." Another well known modern pin-up magazine featuring pin-ups in vintage dress is Retro Lovely. This is the modern day pin-up magazine with the most sold digital and print copies. Within this subculture, there are opportunities to perform in pin-up contests, including one which takes place during the Viva Las Vegas rockabilly festival.

== African-American pin-up ==
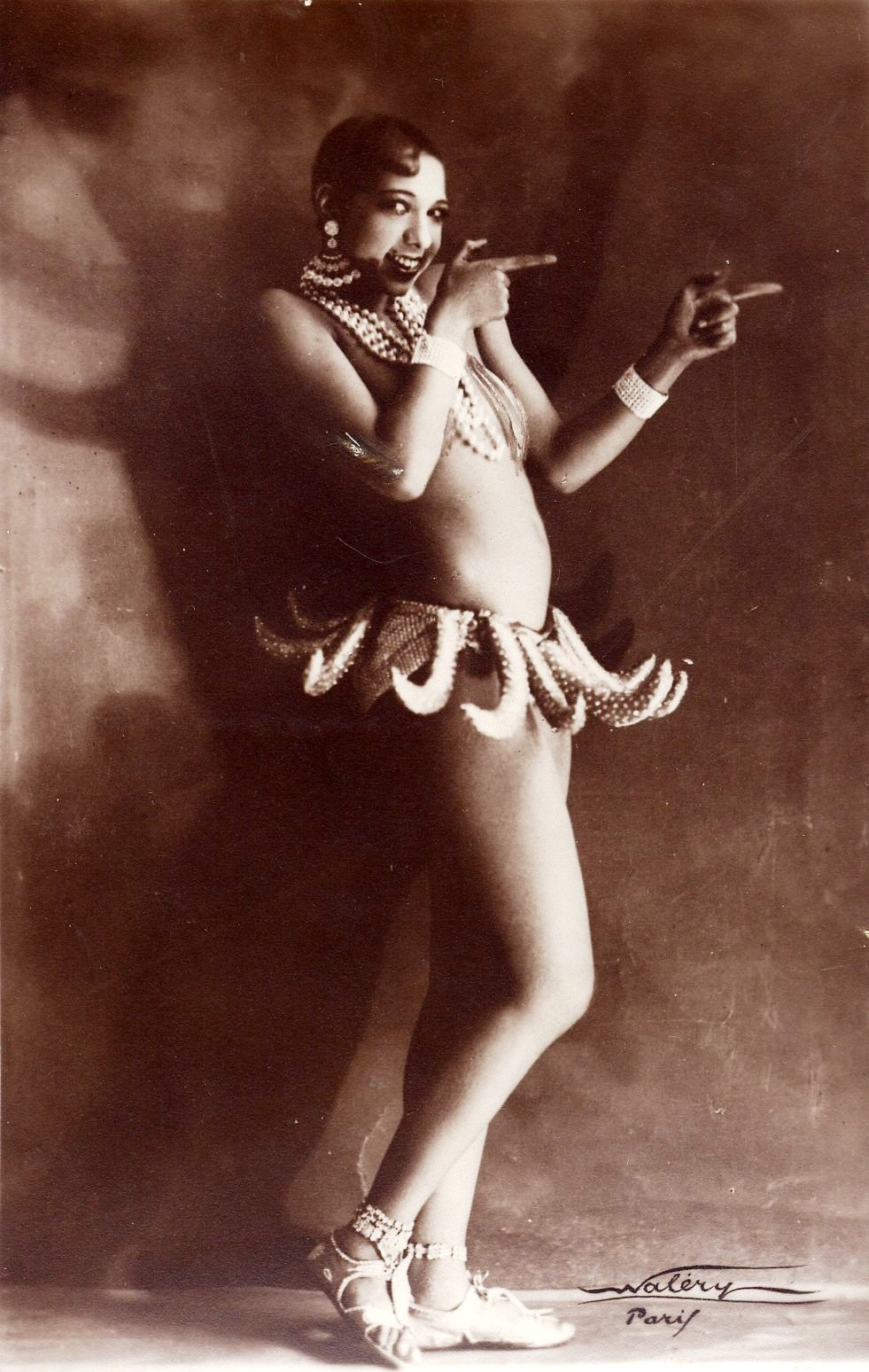
Josephine Baker in a banana skirt from the Folies Bergère production Un Vent de Folie, 1927

Marilyn Monroe and Bettie Page are often cited as the classic pin-up, however there were many Black women who were considered to be impactful. In the 1920s the most notable black burlesque dancer was Josephine Baker. Dorothy Dandridge and Eartha Kitt were important to the pin-up style of their time by using their looks, fame, and personal success. African-American pin-up gained a platform when the magazine Jet (created in 1951) published material related to the African-American community. Jet supported pin-up with their full-page feature called "Beauty of the Week", where African-American women posed in swimsuits. This was intended to showcase the beauty that African-American women possessed in a world where their skin color was under constant scrutiny. It was not until 1965 that Jennifer Jackson became the first African American to be published in Playboy as Playmate of the Month. 1990 marked the first year that Playboy's Playmate of the Year was an African-American woman, Renee Tenison.

Some people believe there is a lack of representation in the media of Black women as pin-up models, even though they were just as influential to the construction of the style.

Historically, Black women in pin-up are still not as common as White women pin-ups. However, the recent revival of pin-up style has propelled many Black women today to be interested and involved with. Making works based on the classic pin-up look to create their own standards of beauty. In Jim Linderman's self-published book, Secret History of the Black Pin Up, he describes the lives and experiences of African-American pin-up models.

== Gallery ==
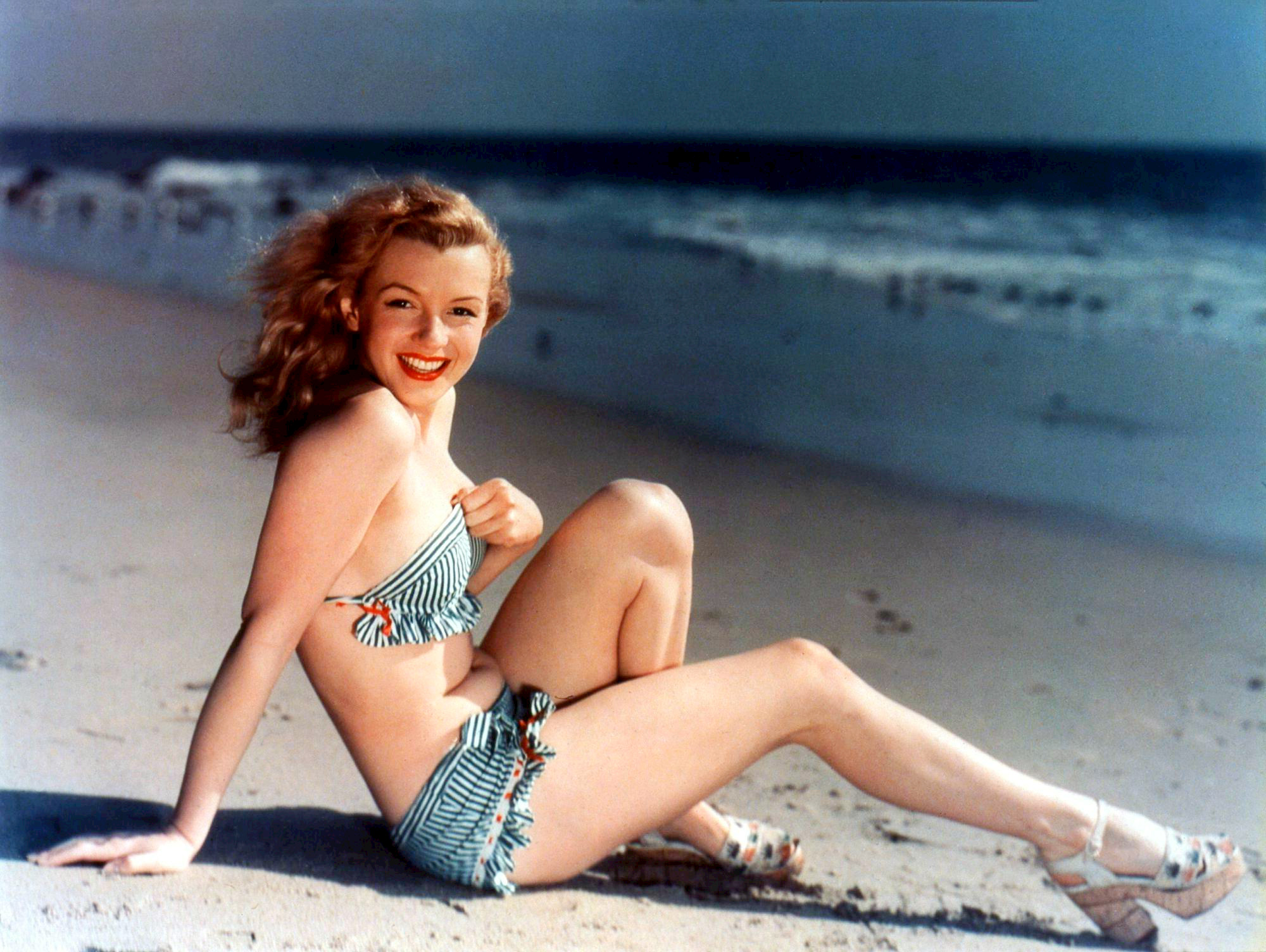
Marilyn Monroe posing for a postcard photograph c. 1940s

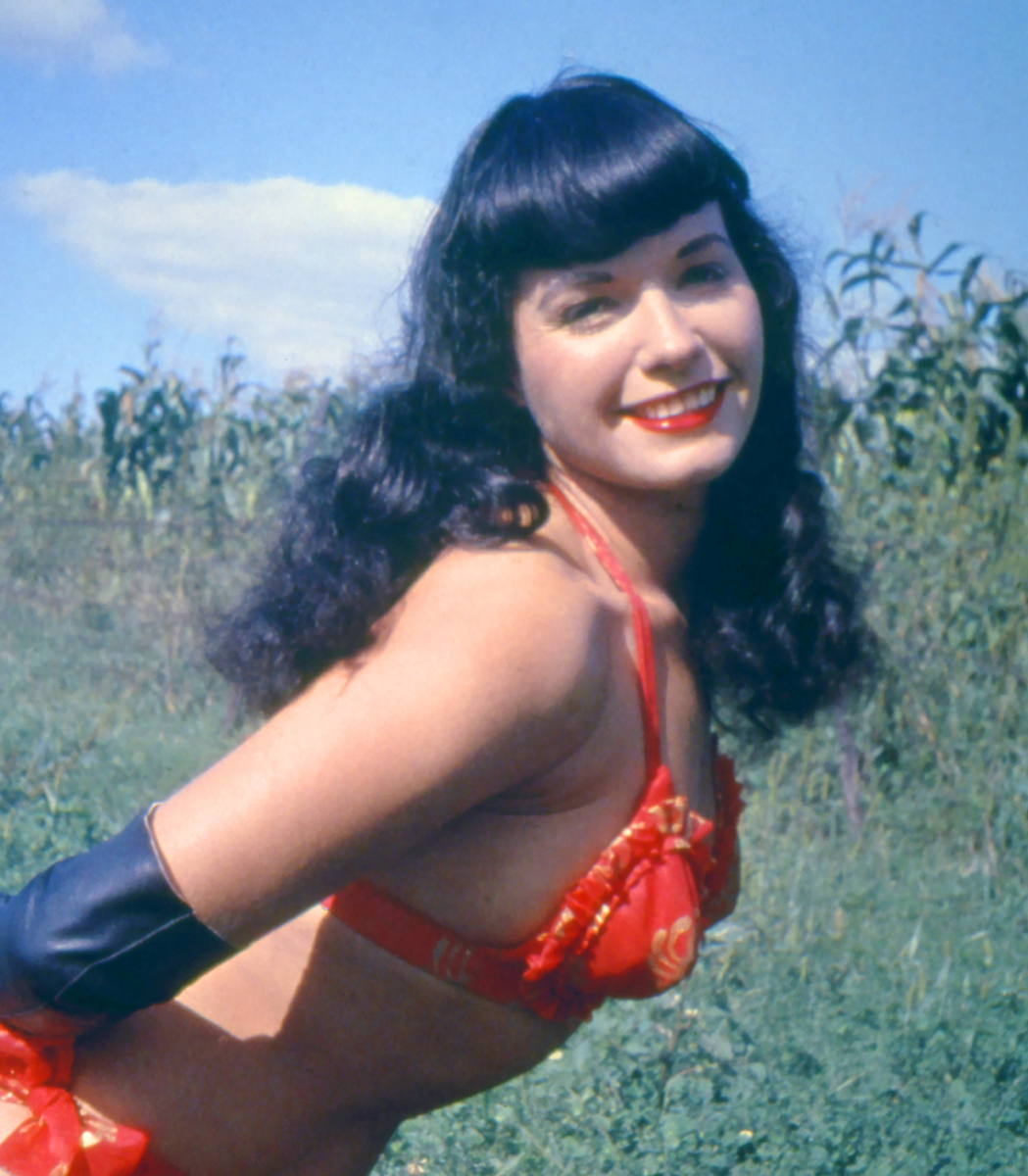
Bettie Page, a highly popular 1950s pin-up model

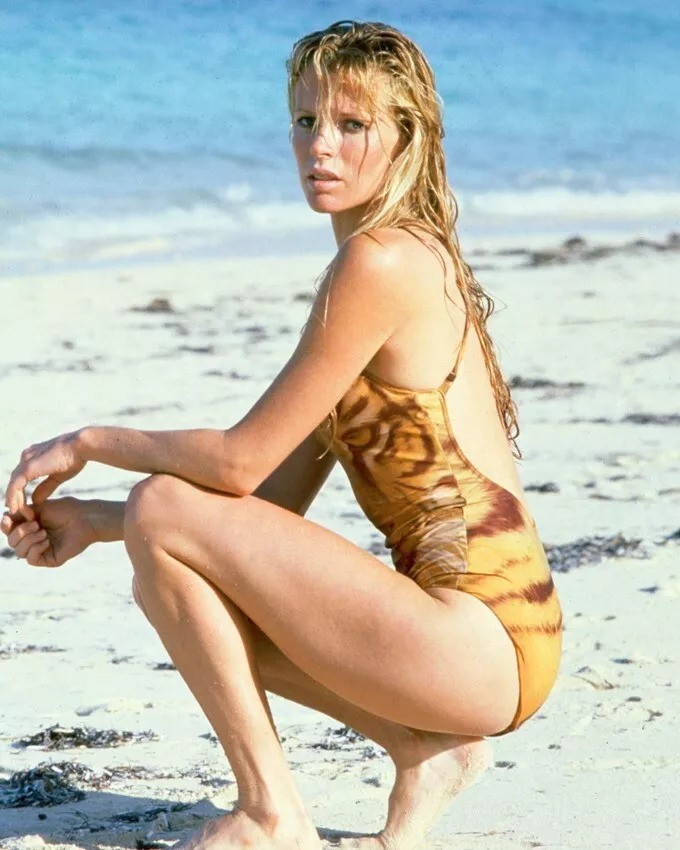
Kim Basinger pin-up from 1983

== See also ==
- Alberto Vargas
- Bad girl art
- Bombshell (slang)
- Centerfold
- Firefighter calendar
- Glamour photography
- Good girl art
- Gravure idols
- Irving Klaw
- List of pin-up artists
- Nose art
- Nude calendar
- Page 3
- SuicideGirls
- Sweater girl
