= Xiea Hull =

- Born: Xiea Hull; June 8, 1993 (age 33); St. John's, Antigua
- Education: Saint Mary's University (Halifax)
- Occupations: Model; Teacher

Xiea Hull (born Xiea Hull; June 8, 1993) is a model and teacher from Antigua and Barbuda. She was born in St. John's, Antigua.

== Life ==
Hull appeared in Caribbean's Next Top Model in 2013. She has appeared on the cover of The Antiguan Traveller in 2012, Pride Magazine August Canadian issue in 2012 and Mirror Mirror Magazine in 2012.

She worked as a full-time high school art teacher at her alma mater the Antigua Girls' High School and the Jennings Secondary School at the age of 18.

Hull has the title of 6th kyu test in the Japanese art Shotokan Karate which she gained at the age of 16. Hull later attended the Saint Mary's University (Halifax) Nova Scotia, Canada studying Psychology and English studies in 2014.

She volunteered at the Children's Ward at Mount St. John's Medical Center in St. John's, Antigua in painting and designing art projects in 2010 with her classmates from the Antigua Girls' High School. She has also aided in the care of 'intelligent disability' patients at the Amazing Grace Foundation in St. John's, Antigua in 2011.
