= Dieux du Stade =

French nude calendar series

2001 edition cover, photographed by Kris Gautier and featuring Mike James

Dieux du Stade (transl. 'Gods of the Stadium', stylized as Dievx dv Stade) is a nude calendar produced by Stade Français, a French professional rugby union club based in Paris. Conceived by club president Max Guazzini as a marketing initiative to promote the club and shift the image of rugby, the calendar features nude and semi-nude photography of the club's members and other sportsmen, occasionally in a homoerotic context. The calendar was first published in 2001, and most recently in 2020. At its peak, Dieux du Stade sold approximately 180,000 copies annually, and by 2019 had sold approximately 1.6 million copies in total.

== History ==
Dieux du Stade was conceived by Max Guazzini, who served as president of Stade Français from 1992 to 2011. A former president of the NRJ Group, Dieux du Stade was one of several marketing initiatives by Guazzini aimed at promoting the club and changing the image of rugby as a sport; other tactics included introducing pink uniforms for Stade Français, and recruiting Madonna and Naomi Campbell to be official sponsors for the club.

The first Dieux du Stade was released for the 2001 calendar year. It features nude and semi-nude photographs of Stade Français' players, occasionally in homoerotic scenarios, though later editions of the calendar expanded beyond Stade Français to feature male athletes from other clubs and sports. The photographer for each edition of Dieux du Stade varies; individuals who have shot the calendar include Steven Klein, Peter Lindbergh, Tony Duran, and François Rousseau. Photographs included in Dieux du Stade have also been published as coffee table books.

Dieux du Stade expanded significantly in popularity in 2004 with the release of Dieux du Stade: Le making of du calendrier 2004, a DVD featuring documentary-style behind-the-scenes footage of that year's photoshoot; similar DVDs would be released for subsequent editions of the calendar. At its peak Dieux du Stade sold approximately 180,000 copies per year, and earned up to €2.3 million annually for Stade Français. By 2019, an estimated 1.6 million copies of Dieux du Stade calendars had been sold. A portion of the profits for some editions of the calendar were donated to charity, while Stade Français received approximately 50 percent of the calendar's sale price (€29 in 2019). According to Guazzini, sales from Dieux du Stade "helped finance the club for many years".

The calendar has occasionally attracted criticism and controversy. Racing 92 attempted to have photographs of player Henry Chavancy removed from the 2012 edition of the calendar days before it was slated to be released, calling it a "slight on Racing's image" and claiming that Chavancy had not sought permission to participate from club management; the calendar was ultimately published without redactions. A frontal nude image of mixed martial arts fighter Sylvain Potard in the 2016 edition of the calendar received significant media attention in France due to the large size of Potard's genitals.

By 2019, annual sales for Dieux du Stade had fallen to 50,000 copies, a trend Libération attributed to a general decline in the popularity of physical calendars amid increasing digitization. Vanity Fair France speculated that the calendar's shift in the mid- to late 2010s towards glossy high fashion-styled photography also contributed to a decline in popularity, a trend the 2020 edition of the calendar attempted to reverse by incorporating a more naturalistic aesthetic. The most recent edition of the calendar was released for the 2020 calendar year; the 2021 edition was canceled due to the COVID-19 pandemic, and no subsequent editions have been produced.

== List of editions ==
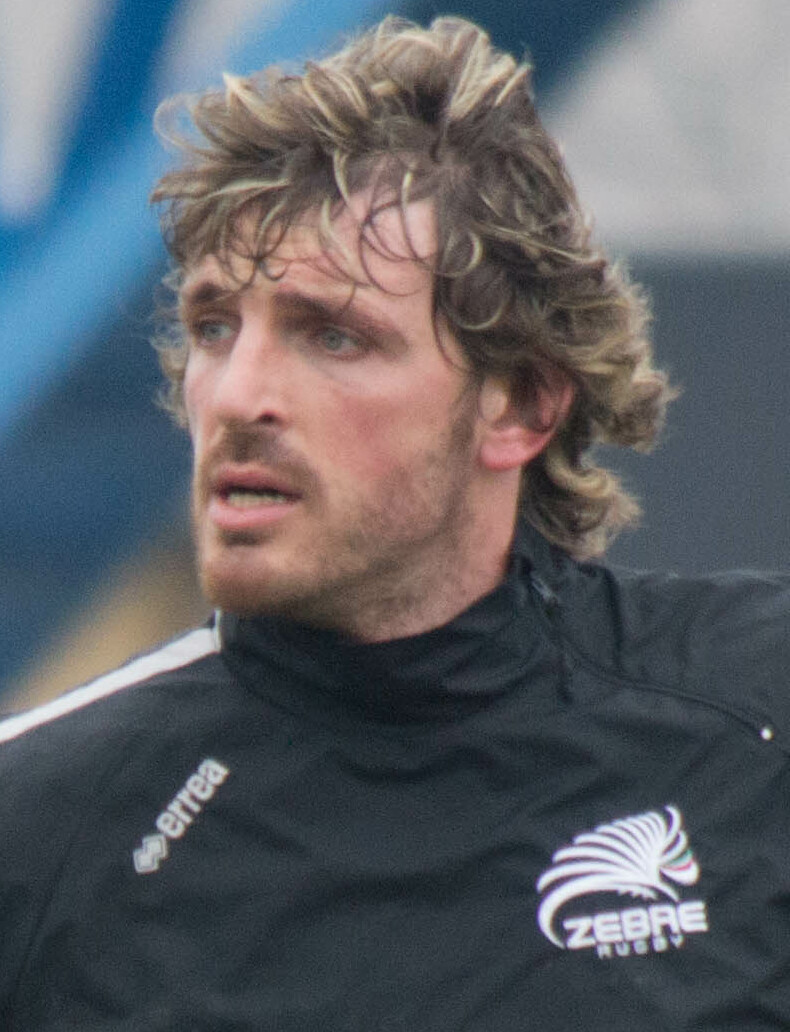
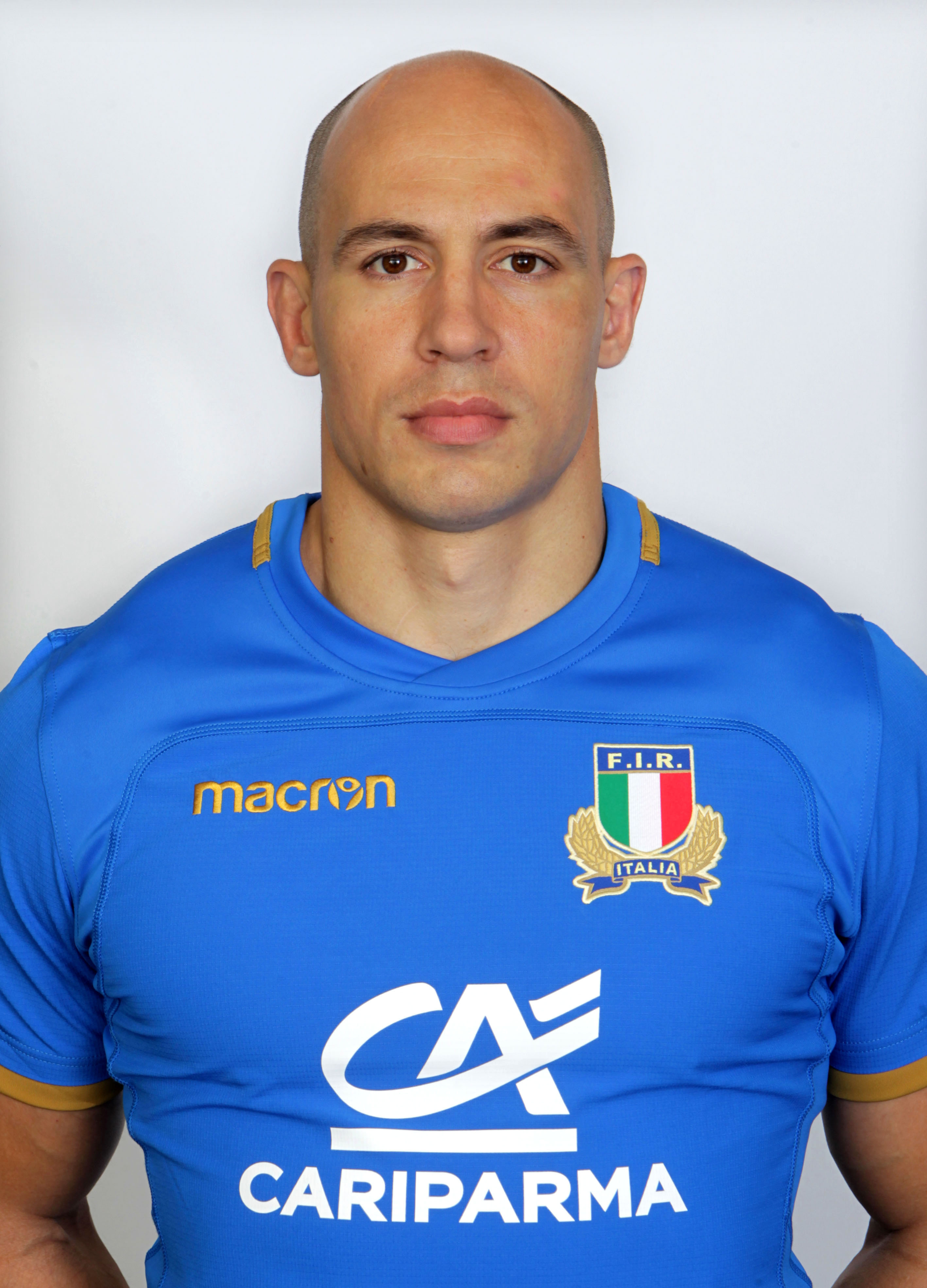
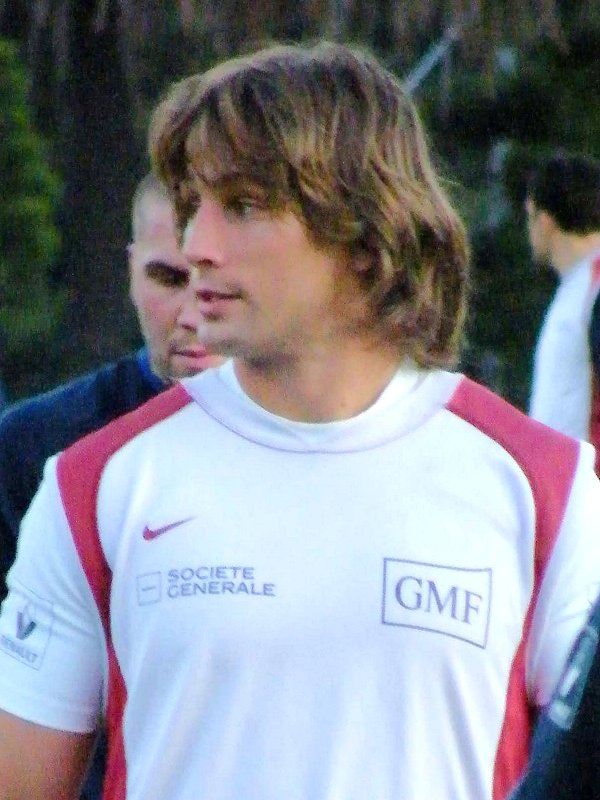
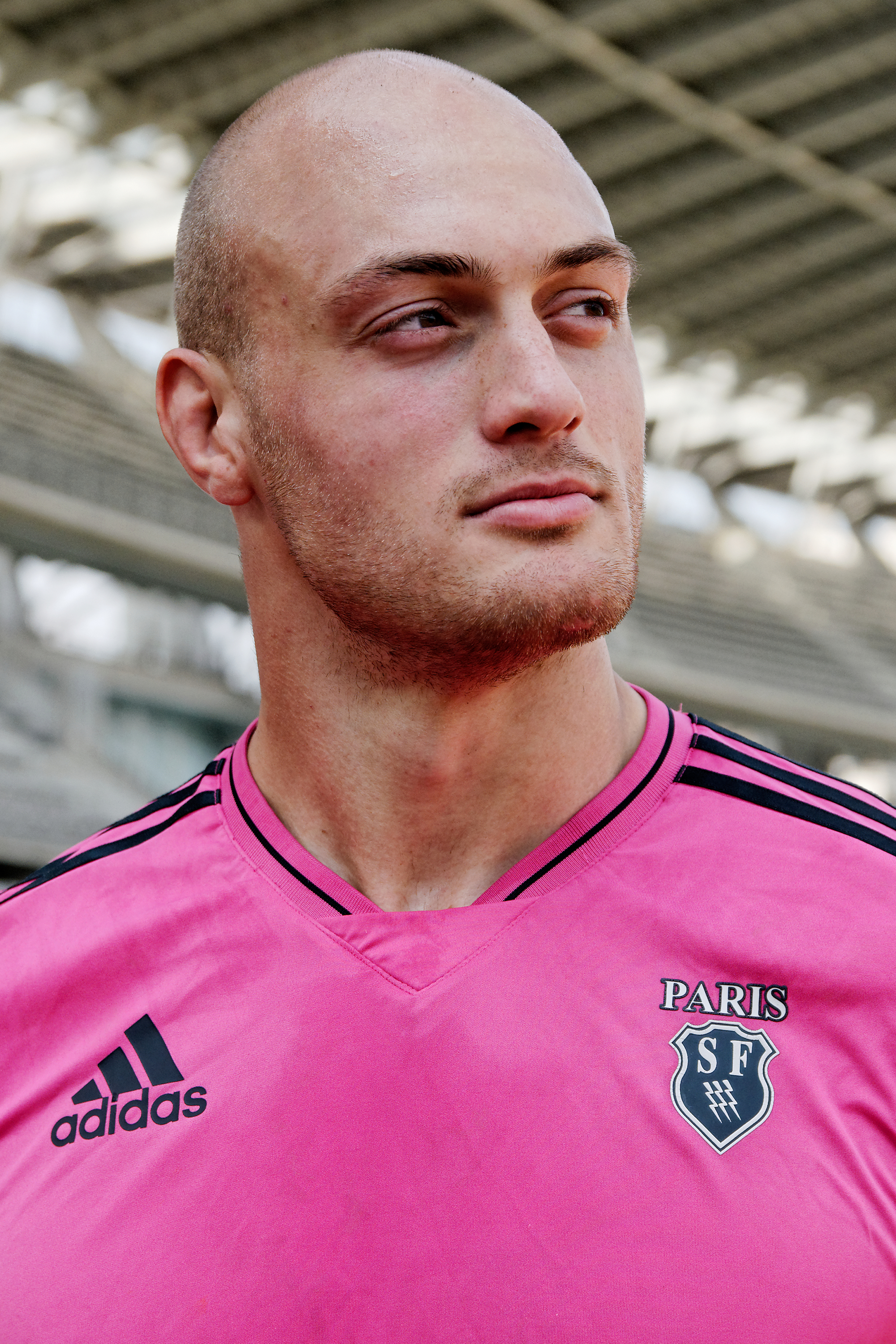
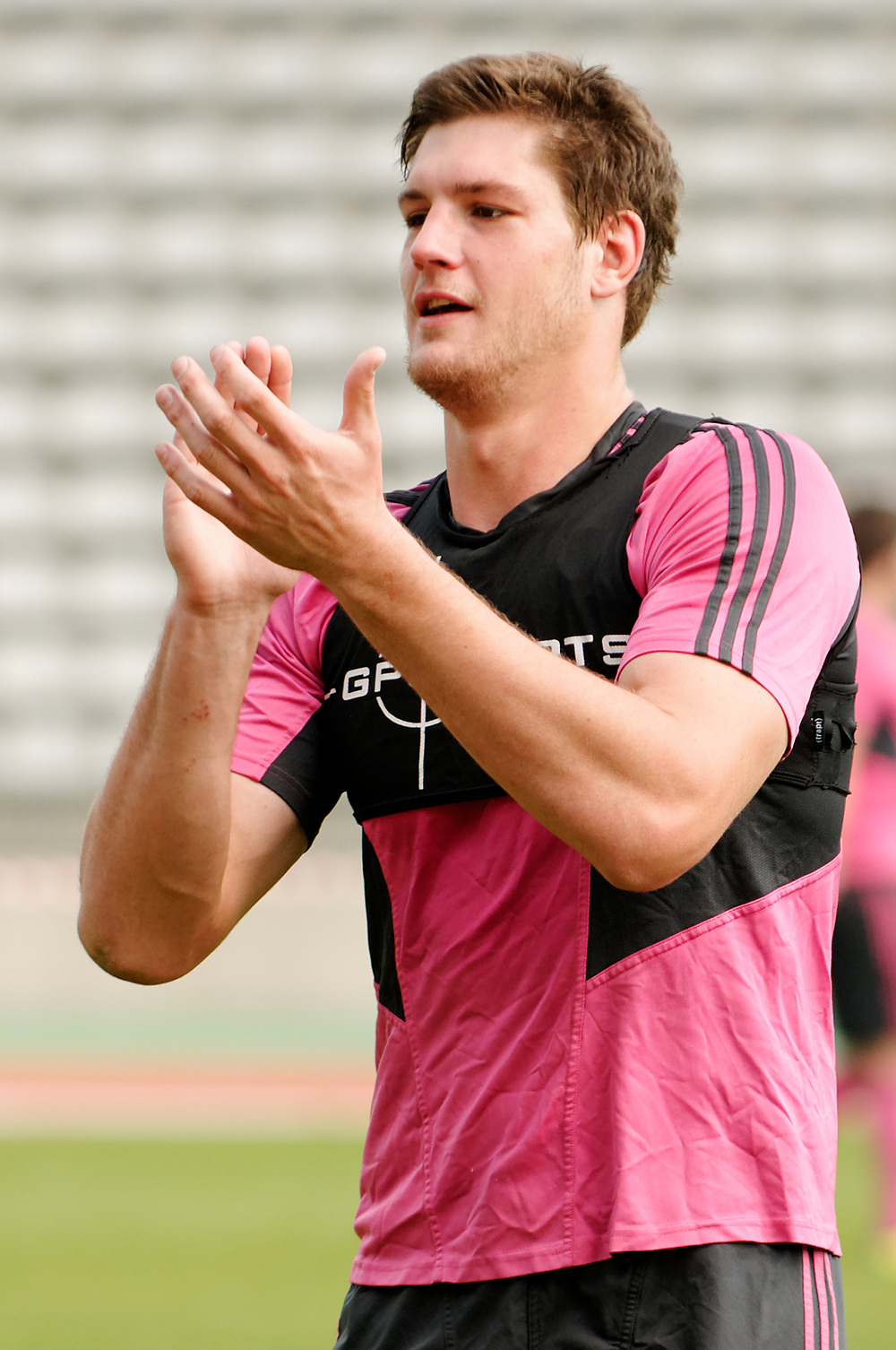
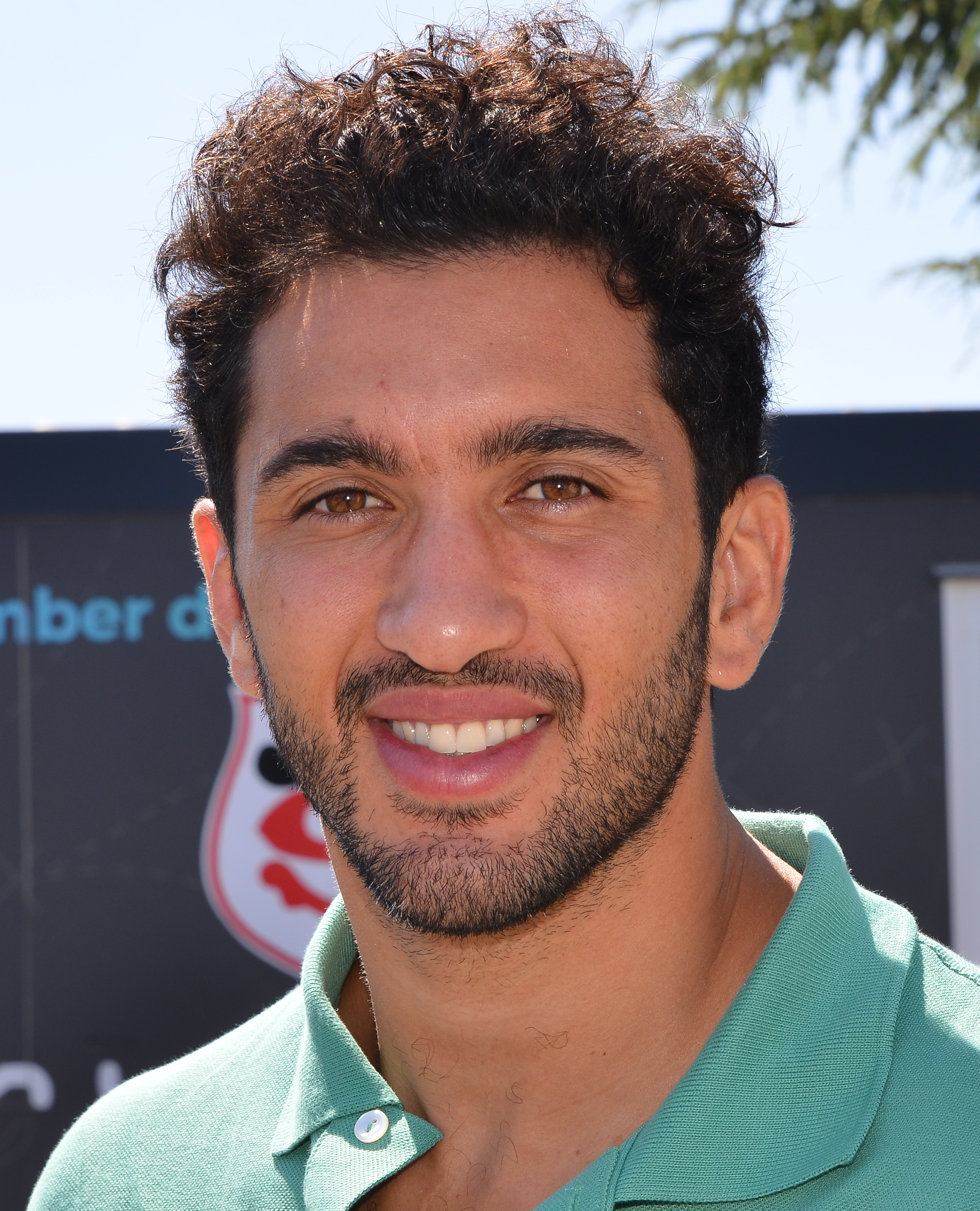
Selected Dieux du Stade cover models. Top row: Mirco Bergamasco (2004), Sergio Parisse (2009 and 2016), Dimitri Szarzewski (2011). Bottom row: Scott LaValla (2013), Alexandre Flanquart (2014), Maxime Mermoz (2018)

Year	Photographer	Cover model	Ref.
2001	Kris Gautier	(Canada) Mike James	
2002	Kris Gautier	(France) Thomas Lombard	
2003	Mathias Vriens	(Argentina) Ignacio Corleto	
2004	François Rousseau	(Italy) Mirco Bergamasco	
2005	Carter Smith	(France) Olivier Sarraméa	
2006	Fred Goudon	(Argentina) Juan Martín Hernández	
2007	Mariano Vivanco	(France) Julien Arias	
2008	Steven Klein	(France) Geoffroy Messina	
2009	Peter Lindbergh	(Italy) Sergio Parisse	
2010	Tony Duran	(England) James Haskell	
2011	François Rousseau	(France) Dimitri Szarzewski	
2012	François Rousseau	(France) Sébastien Torresin	
2013	François Rousseau	(United States) Scott LaValla	
2014	Fred Goudon	(France) Alexandre Flanquart	
2015	Fred Goudon	(France) Morgan Parra	
2016	Fred Goudon	(Italy) Sergio Parisse	
2017	Errikos Andreou	(France) Terry Bouhraoua	
2018	Errikos Andreou	(France) Maxime Mermoz	
2019	Ludovic Baron	(France) Clément Daguin	
2020	Pierre-Ange Carlotti	(France) Jules Plisson	

== See also ==
- The Body Issue
- Naked Rugby League
- Pirelli Calendar
- University of Warwick Boat Club
