= Steve Witt =

Australian rugby league footballer

Personal information
- Born: 10 June 1982 (age 44) Toowoomba, Queensland, Australia

Playing information
- Position: Five-eighth, Halfback
Club
Years	Team	Pld	T	G	FG	P
2004–05	Newcastle Knights	19	5	0	0	20
- Source: As of 8 February 2019
- Relatives: Michael Witt (brother)

Steve Witt (born 10 June 1982) is a former professional rugby league footballer who played in the 2000s. Witt played all of his top-level rugby league for the Newcastle Knights.

== Background ==
Witt was born in Toowoomba, Queensland. Witt played junior football for the Parramatta Eels with his younger brother Michael. Never making first-grade for the Eels.

== Playing career ==
Witt made his NRL debut on 10 April 2004. Witt went on to play in 19 matches over two seasons for the Knights.
