= Fred Goudon =

French professional photographer

Fred Goudon is a French professional photographer. Originally from Cannes (south of France), he is now based in Paris.

He started shooting when his father gave him a camera as a gift on his 16th birthday. His work includes shooting of the 2006 issue of Dieux du Stade, (English: Gods of the Stadium) calendar and DVD, featuring nude and semi-nude photographs of members of Stade Français, a Paris-based domestic French rugby team as well as at times players from other rugby union clubs and athletes from other sports. He was invited again to shoot both the 2014 calendar issue and the 2015 issue of the series. He publishes some of his work in books through Bruno Gmunder publishers.

== Works ==
(Selective)

Calendars

- 2006: DIEVX DV STADE 2006
- 2009: Provocateur and Magnifique
- 2010: Gilles Marini
- 2010: Masculinity
- 2011: Cinq
- 2014: DIEVX DV STADE 2014
- 2015: DIEVX DV STADE 2015

Books

- 2000: Bed Time Stories by Bruno Gmunder
- 2005: Aqua
- 2007: Sunday Morning
- 2008: Virility
- 2010: Cing
- 2013: Summer Souvenirs
