= Thierry Goudon =

French mathematician (born 1969)

- Born: January 1969 (age 57); Aix-en-Provence, France
- Education: University of Bordeaux
- Scientific career
- Fields: Applied mathematics
- Workplaces: INRIA
- Doctoral advisor: Kamal Hamdache

Thierry Goudon (born January 1969 in Aix-en-Provence, France) is a French mathematician. He works in applied mathematics, with interest in the study of Partial Differential Equations motivated from physics. He has made contributions on kinetic theory, which corresponds to a description of matter in terms of statistical physics. The Boltzmann equation for gas dynamics is a typical example of this activity. The kinetic framework also arises in many other fields: neutron transport, radiative transfer, and biology. He is interested in asymptotic analysis, including the study of hydrodynamic regimes and homogenization theory, establishing relationships between microscopic and macroscopic descriptions. He also works on fluid mechanics, both as regards the analysis of the equations and also the design of numerical methods for computing the solutions. Currently he holds a Senior INRIA Researcher (Directeur de recherche) position at Sophia Antipolis; he is the head of the team COFFEE devoted to Complex Flows For Energy and Environment.

== Biography ==
Thierry Goudon completed his undergraduate studies in Aix-en-Provence and in Bordeaux, where he attended the Matmeca program. He obtained the PhD degree under supervision of Kamal Hamdache in 1997 at University Bordeaux 1. He joined the University of Nice as Assistant Professor (Maitre de conferences). He obtain the Habilitation to conduct research in 2001 and he became Full Professor at the University of Lille in 2003. Since 2008, he has held the pots of a Senior INRIA Researcher, in Lille until 2011, then in Sophia Antipolis. In 2008, he was awarded the Robert Dautray prize, jointly with Jean-Francois Clouet from the French Atomic Commission: this exceptional prize, funded by the French Society of Applied and Industrial Mathematics in the honor of R. Dautray's 80th birthday, honours remarkable works on radiative transfer theory and its applications.
