= Caribbean's Next Top Model season 4 =

Caribbean's Next Top Model
- Season 4
- No. of episodes: 11

Release
- Original network: Flow TV
- Original release: February 14 – April 25, 2018

Season chronology
- ← Previous; Season 3

The fourth season of Caribbean's Next Top Model, a Caribbean reality television show, premiered on 14 February 2018. It features a number of aspiring models from the entire Caribbean region, who compete for a chance to begin their career in the modelling industry. The fourth season of the show has 16 contestants and was taped in Jamaica. The winner was Le Shae Riley from Trinidad & Tobago.

== Cast ==
=== Contestants ===
(Ages stated are at start of contest)

Country	Contestant	Age	Height	Finish	Place
Grenada	Kerryne James	19	1.70 m (5 ft 7 in)	Episode 2	12
Trinidad and Tobago	Vanessa John	24	1.65 m (5 ft 5 in)	Episode 3	11
Trinidad and Tobago	Trevine Sellier	23	1.80 m (5 ft 11 in)	Episode 4	10-8
Jamaica	Saskia Lewin	18	1.68 m (5 ft 6 in)	Episode 4	10-8
The Bahamas	Kristina Robinson	18	1.83 m (6 ft 0 in)	Episode 4	10-8
Aruba	Chimay Ramos	22	1.68 m (5 ft 6 in)	Episode 5	7
Grenada	Usha Thomas	23	1.80 m (5 ft 11 in)	Episode 6	6
Panama	Ingrid Suarez	20	1.70 m (5 ft 7 in)	Episode 7	5
Panama	Natalie Whittington	20	1.73 m (5 ft 8 in)	Episode 8	4
Trinidad and Tobago	Gabriella Bernard	23	1.73 m (5 ft 8 in)	Episode 9	3
Suriname	Daphne Veldkamp	21	1.70 m (5 ft 7 in)	Episode 11	2
Trinidad and Tobago	Le Shae Riley	23	1.80 m (5 ft 11 in)	Episode 11	1

== Episodes ==
No. overall	No. in season	Title	Original release date
33	1	"Episode 1"	14 February 2018
This was the casting episode. The 16 semi-finalists were narrowed down to the top twelve who will compete for the title of Caribbean's Next Top Model.: Eliminated: Afrecia Cowan, Allana Phoenix, Leighan Stone & Soleil Colquhoun
34	2	"Episode 2"	21 February 2018
This episode the girls had their make overs and had their promoshoot. At judging Le Shae won best performance. Kerryne and Saskia fell into the bottom two, with Kerryne being the first to leave. Placing 12th overall.: First call-out: Le Shae Riley; Bottom two: Kerryne James & Saskia Lewin; Eliminated: Kerryne James
35	3	"Episode 3"	28 February 2018
First call-out: Gabriella Bernard; Bottom two: Kristina Robinson & Vanessa John; Eliminated: Vanessa John
36	4	"Episode 4"	7 March 2018
First call-out: Natalie Whittington; Bottom four: Kristina Robinson, Saskia Lewin, Trevine Sellier & Usha Thomas; Eliminated: Kristina Robinson, Saskia Lewin & Trevine Sellier
37	5	"Episode 5"	14 March 2018
First call-out: Ingrid Suarez; Bottom two: Chimay Ramos & Usha Thomas; Eliminated: Chimay Ramos
38	6	"Episode 6"	21 March 2018
First call-out: Daphne Veldkamp; Bottom two: Ingrid Suarez & Usha Thomas; Eliminated: Usha Thomas
39	7	"Episode 7"	28 March 2018
First call-out: Daphne Veldkamp; Bottom two: Ingrid Suarez & Le Shae Riley; Eliminated: Ingrid Suarez
40	8	"Episode 8"	4 April 2018
First call-out: Le Shae Riley; Bottom two: Gabriella Bernard & Natalie Whittington; Eliminated: Natalie Whittington
41	9	"Episode 9"	11 April 2018
First call-out: Daphne Veldkamp; Bottom two: Gabriella Bernard & Le Shae Riley; Eliminated: Gabriella Bernard
42	10	"Episode 10"	18 April 2018
This was the recap episode.
43	11	"Episode 11"	25 April 2018
Final two: Daphne Veldkamp & Le Shae Riley; Caribbean's Next Top Model Le Shae Riley

== Results ==
Order	Episodes								
Order	2	3	4	5	6	7	8	9	11
1	Le Shae	Gabriella	Natalie	Ingrid	Daphne	Daphne	Le Shae	Daphne	Le Shae
2	Natalie	Ingrid	Le Shae	Gabriella	Gabriella	Gabriella	Daphne	Le Shae	Daphne
3	Chimay	Daphne	Daphne	Daphne	Le Shae	Natalie	Gabriella	Gabriella	
4	Ingrid	Natalie	Chimay	Natalie	Natalie	Le Shae	Natalie		
5	Daphne	Le Shae	Gabriella	Le Shae	Ingrid	Ingrid			
6	Usha	Chimay	Ingrid	Usha	Usha				
7	Gabriella	Usha	Usha	Chimay					
8	Trevine	Trevine	Kristina; Saskia; Trevine						
9	Vanessa	Saskia	Kristina; Saskia; Trevine						
10	Kristina	Kristina	Kristina; Saskia; Trevine						
11	Saskia	Vanessa							
12	Kerryne								

The contestant was eliminated from the competition
The contestant won the competition

=== Bottom two/four ===
Episodes	Contestants			Eliminated
2	Kerryne	&	Saskia	Kerryne
3	Kristina	&	Vanessa	Vanessa
4	Kristina, Saskia, Trevine, Usha			Trevine
4	Kristina, Saskia, Trevine, Usha			Saskia
4	Kristina, Saskia, Trevine, Usha			Kristina
5	Chimay	&	Usha	Chimay
6	Ingrid	&	Usha	Usha
7	Ingrid	&	Le Shae	Ingrid
8	Gabriella	&	Natalie	Natalie
9	Gabriella	&	Le Shae	Gabriella
11	Daphne	&	Le Shae	Daphne

The contestant was eliminated after their first time in the bottom two
The contestant was eliminated after their second time in the bottom two
The contestant was eliminated after their third time in the bottom two
The contestant was eliminated and placed as the runner-up

=== Photo shoots ===
- Episode 1 photo shoot: Raw beauty in comp cards (casting)
- Episode 2 photo shoot: Extreme posing while showcasing makeovers & promotional shots
- Episode 3 photo shoot: Modeling with headpieces on garden fields
- Episode 4 photo shoot: Gold bikini on a beach
- Episode 5 photo shoot: Close-up natural beauty shots
- Episode 6 photo shoot: Sexy styling editorial in a dancehall
- Episode 7 photo shoot: Flying with a fabric in mid-air
- Episode 8 photo shoot: Marriage couture by the seashore
- Episode 9 photo shoot: Posing on a window hole with metallic body paint
- Episode 11 photo shoot: Posing in gowns at the Devon House
