= François Rousseau =

French painter/photographer (born 1967)

- Born: 1967 (age 58–59)
- Known for: Photography, painting
- Website: francoisrousseau.com

François Rousseau is a professional French painter and photographer born in 1967.

He started in painting for almost ten years, before turning to photography in 1995. The link started when he discovered Patrick Grainville's novel, L'Atelier du Peintre (The Painter's Studio) when it came out in 1988 about the relationship of the painter to his models, of different backgrounds, who posed in the studio. It was as if the models had waited to be born and even chosen by the master. This resulted in Rousseau's work Atelier. Mikael Karlsson composed Life Class, a 25-minute musical work accompanying Atelier that became a vital part of the project. Photos from Atelier became a part of an exhibition at the Maison européenne de la photographie in Paris until April 2009.

He has photographed the 2004, 2011 and 2012 annual issues of Dieux du Stade, a popular series of nude and semi-nude calendars based on members of Stade Français, a Paris-based French rugby team. His work was also documented in famous Dieux du Stade book Locker Room Nudes.

He has photographed other athletes, most notably Olympic athletes Steeve and Christophe Guenot in 2004, many models and a number of Out magazine covers (like John Barrowman) and Vampires in L.A feature and major articles features like Chad White in the magazine. ORA was a successful photo book project in 2008 and the Wet Men book project.

François Rousseau's photos were used for the promotional launching poster of French gay Pink TV channel. His Habibi NYC and Amor Causa Brazilian shoots of individuals picked from the street gave him an independent profile.

On 5 October 2012 L'Express.FR and a top Parisian writer Isabelle Aithnard compared Têtu 2013 Calendar by Lope Navo to the longest running Les Dieux du Stade by the veteran French photographer François Rousseau's 2013 Calendar. Aithnard concluded she prefers Têtu Lope Navo 2013 Calendar for casting an exotic variety of exquisite Brazilian men who don't only appeal to gay men but also to straight women.

== Books and publications ==
- 2004: Dieux du stade: Le livre
- 2005: Locker Room Nudes Dieux du Stade: The French National Rugby Team (Universe)
- 2005: Male Nudes (Photography by Rousseau, text by Philippe Castetbon) (editions Silverback Books)
- 2005: Princes of the Sea (Passionate Pursuits) (Fitway Publishing)
- 2005: Amor Causa (Fitway Publishing)
- 2006: Nu (Photography by Rousseau, text by Philippe Castetbon) (edition Fitway Publishing)
- 2008: ORA
- 2009: Men in Motion: The Art and Passion of the Male Dancer (Universe)
- 2011: Wet Men (François Rousseau) (Rizzoli)
- 2011: Eaux d'hommes (François Rousseau, Vanessa Blondel et Catherine Bonifassi)

Calendars

- 2010: Dieux du Stade 2011 (Photographer: François Rousseau)
- 2011: Dieux du Stade Calendrier 2012 (Photographer: François Rousseau)

== Exhibitions ==
- 2009: Atelier at Maison européenne de la Photographie
- 2008: maison européenne de la Photographie, Paris

== Personal life ==
François Rousseau is openly gay and his work portrays mainly gay themes, the male body, athleticism and spirituality.
