= Lene Hall =

Barbadian model

- Born: Sherrylene Hall; Barbados
- Modeling information
- Height: 5 ft 11 in (1.80 m)
- Hair color: Black
- Eye color: Brown
- Agency: Major Model Management

Lene Hall (born Sherrylene Hall) is a Barbadian model. She modeled throughout her high school career, but it was only when an agent approached Hall at her work place in Barbados and encouraged her to come to New York City that she would have her chance on the international fashion stage. Things moved quickly: on her first interview with an agency, she was signed on the spot and sent directly for her first casting at "Prescriptive by Estée Lauder." Hall landed the job, becoming the face of Prescriptive for the next year. Hall has gone on to walk the runway for Ralph Lauren and European couture designers. In addition to Esteé Lauder, Hall has done campaigns for Noxzema, Lubriderm, Kohler, and Vaniqua, and has been the face for Revlon, Lafayette 148, and Oil of Olay.

Hall has been photographed for Harper's Bazaar, Spanish Vogue, Elle, Oprah, Marie Claire, and Essence. She appeared on the cover of Sam Fine's Fine Beauty. American Photo magazine named Hall one of the top 10 up-and-coming models.

Hall gives freely of her time to charities to help in their cause to raise funds, in Barbados and internationally, including Jamaica and Africa. She also took part in the NY fashion industry's charity event for the victims of September 11. Her philosophy is that she has received so much that one should pass it on to those who have not had the opportunities she has been afforded in life.

She is currently under contract with Major Model Management.
