= Nude calendar =

Calendars with nude imagery

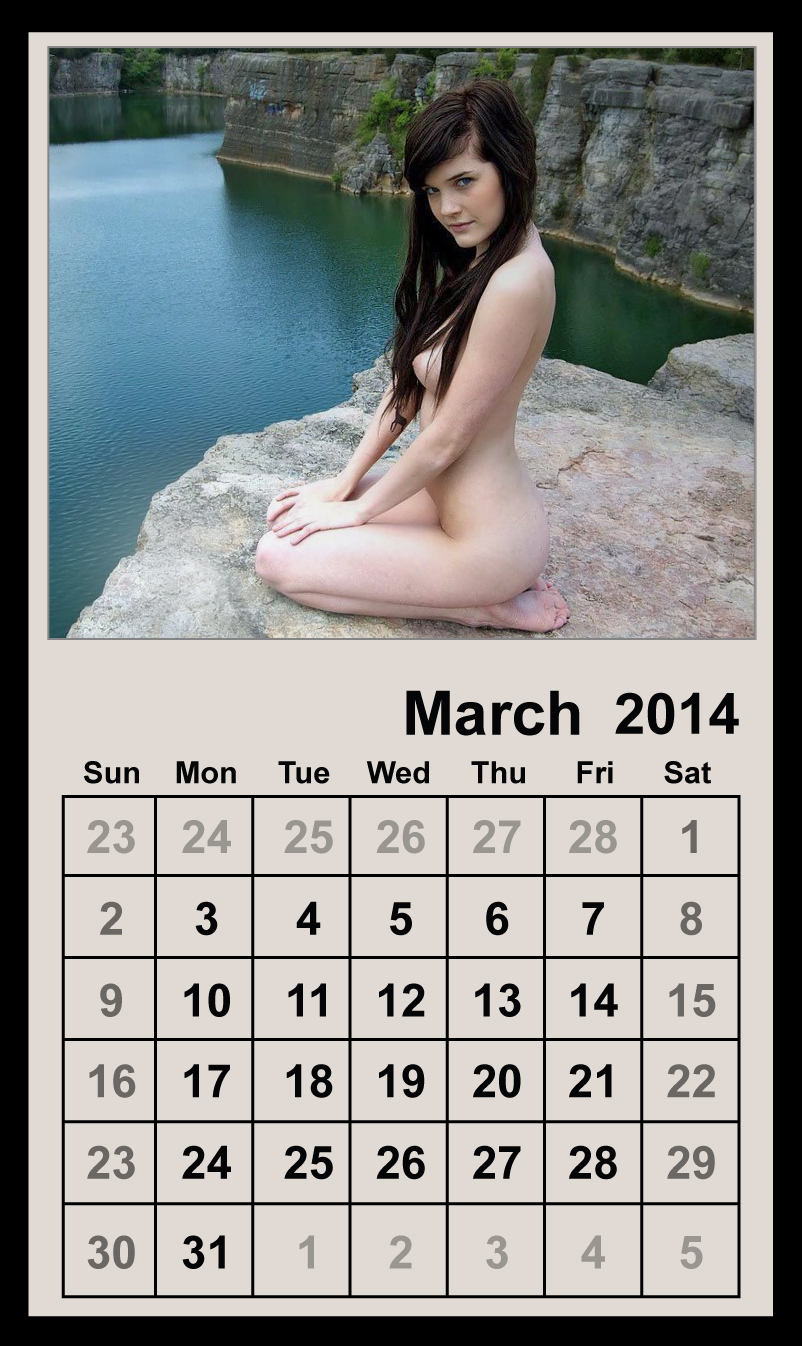
Image illustrative of a female nude calendar

Nude calendars are a type of wall calendar that feature nude models in a variety of scenes and locations. In the United Kingdom, nude calendars are predominantly produced to raise money for charity.

== Background ==
Some sports teams have produced nude calendars, often to raise their profile or increase funding. Examples include the Australia women's national soccer team prior to the 2000 Summer Olympics in Sydney, the Canadian cross-country ski team in 2001 and 2002, and a group of Canadian women biathletes in 2008. In 2009, Australian Football League and Australian Rugby League players produced a nude calendar to raise money for the McGrath Foundation.

The first nude charity calendar was made by a group of middle-aged Englishwomen, members of a local branch of the Women's Institute, who were posing nude to raise funds for Leukaemia Research. The calendar was released in 1999, and became an international sensation, and also inspired the movie Calendar Girls.

From 2004 to 2006, men from Junction City, Oregon produced male nude calendars to raise money for the public school system. Another notable example of a charity nude calendar is the Naked Rugby League calendar, created in Australia to raise money for the National Breast Cancer Foundation.

== See also ==
- French postcard
- Firefighter calendar
- Nude photography
