= Pedro Virgil =

Australian photographer and Reality TV show personality

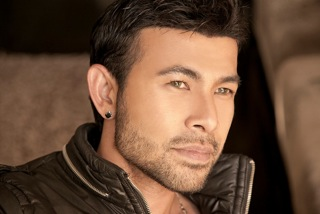
- Candid shot of Pedro Virgil in Fiji.
- Born: 28 August 1973 (age 52); Savusavu, Fiji Islands
- Occupation: Fashion photographer
- Website: http://www.pedrovirgil.net/

Pedro Virgil (born 28 August 1973) is a Fiji born Australian photographer and Reality TV show personality, and engineer. He is best known in the Americas for his participation as a judge and photographer on the reality show Caribbean's Next Top Model, a Guest Photographer on Australia's Next Top Model and Project Runway Australia seasons 1 & 2, and his photography is featured in many magazines covers and editorials including: Inside Sport, Men's Health, GQ, Sports Illustrated, Gay Times, DNA Magazine, FHM, Details. He has worked with a long list of corporate agencies and prestigious clientele both nationally and internationally.

== Career ==
Pedro's work can be recognised on major billboards from high-profile brands such as Rolex, Sony, Adidas, Sony Ericsson, Van Heusen, underwear campaigns such as Calvin Klein, and hit television shows: Australia's Next Top Model, Project Runway seasons I & II, Football Superstar, Caribbean's Next Top Model and Australian Idol. He was also commissioned for the global advertising campaigns for Ed Hardy by Christian Audigier in Australia, United States, Europe and Asia. ,

He is renowned for depicting nude and semi-nude photos of Australian sportsmen, most notably in a series of calendars including: League of Their Own, Naked Rugby League, Naked for a Cause and the global campaign Gods of Football, the proceeds of which help support breast cancer sufferers, through Pedro's ongoing alignment with The McGrath Foundation.

He has published a hardcover book Gods of Sport. It is an artistic photo book dedicated to Australian rugby and Australian rules football players, and includes hundreds of images taken from behind-the-scenes of the shooting of the recent Naked for a Cause: Australian Footballers 2009 calendar. He followed that with the Gods of Football.

He has also shot the famous bodybuilder, Aziz Shavershian (Zyzz), the photos which went viral all over the social media.

In May 2010, he signed a contract joining A.E. Entertainment Public Relations as one of their photographers.

Pedro is an international ambassador of the RSPCA and works to protect and fight for animal rights.
