= Charles Evans Hughes (disambiguation) =

Charles Evans Hughes was an American politician and Chief Justice of the United States.

Charles Evans Hughes may also refer to:

- Charles Evans Hughes Jr., son of the Chief Justice
- Charles Evans Hughes III, son of the above and grandson of the Chief Justice
