= Lamuel A. Stanislaus =

Grenadian dentist and diplomat

Grenadian Permanent Representative to the United Nations from Grenada to United Nations
- In office January 18, 1985 appointed, May 10, 1985 accredited – June 30, 1990
- Prime Minister: Keith Mitchell
- Preceded by: Gloria Payne Banfield
- Succeeded by: Eugene M. Pursoo

Grenadian Permanent Representative to the United Nations from Grenada to United Nations
- In office December 18, 1998 appointed, December 21, 1998 accredited – November 8, 2004
- Prime Minister: Keith Mitchell
- Preceded by: Robert E. Millette
- Succeeded by: Ruth Elizabeth Rouse

Personal details
- Born: April 22, 1921 Petite Martinique
- Died: September 18, 2016 (aged 95) Brooklyn, New York, U.S.
- Spouse: Beryl Stanislaus
- Children: five
- Education: From 1933 to 1938 he was educated at Grenada Boys’ Secondary School.; In 1948, he received the BS (summa cum laude) Howard University, In 1953 he became Doctor of Dental Surgery (DDS).dental school at Howard University
- Occupation: Dentist, Ambassador

Lamuel A. Stanislaus CBE (April 22, 1921 – September 18, 2016) was a Grenadian dentist and diplomat. Lamuel Stanislaus left Grenada in the mid 1940s to attend dental school at Howard University. After 1956 he lived in Brooklyn where he founded Caribbeans for Ed Koch. On January 18, 1985 he was appointed Permanent Representative of Grenada to the United Nations in New York City where he was representative from May 10, 1985 to June 30, 1990, he would also serve as Ambassador-at–Large and Deputy Permanent Representative for two years. On December 18, 1998 Stanislaus was again appointed Permanent Representative of Grenada to the United Nations in New York City, he would hold this position from December 21, 1998 to November 8, 2004.

Stanislaus died on September 18, 2016, at the age of 95 in Brooklyn, New York, U.S.
