= Hughes Hubbard & Reed =

American law firm

Hughes Hubbard & Reed LLP
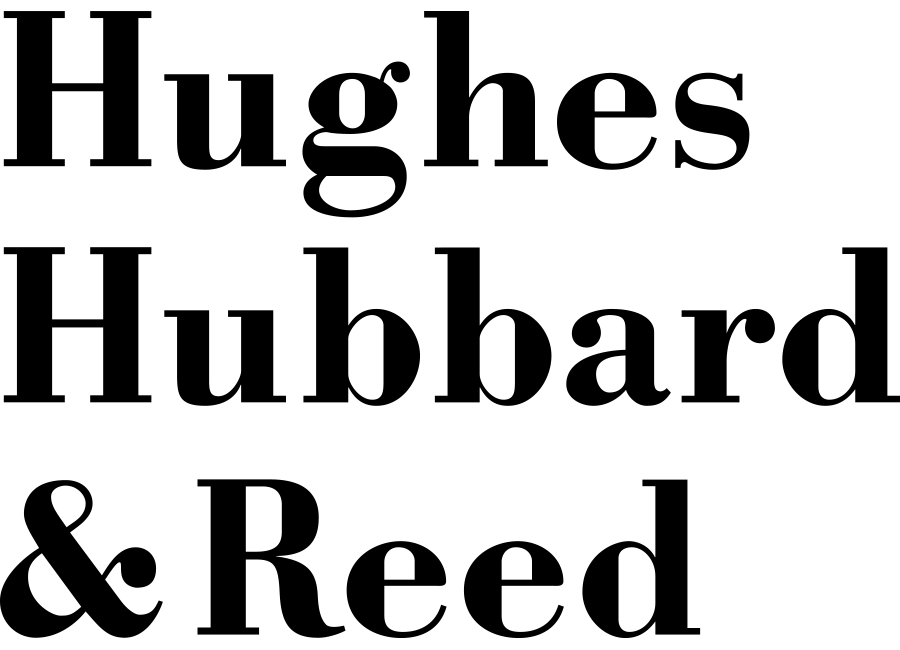
- Headquarters: New York, N.Y.
- No. of offices: 7 (2 international)
- No. of attorneys: 218 (2023)
- Major practice areas: General practice
- Key people: Neil Oxford, Chair; Robb Patryk, Managing Partner
- Revenue: gross revenue $301 million USD (2022)
- Date founded: 1888
- Founder: Charles Evans Hughes
- Company type: Limited liability partnership
- Website: www.hugheshubbard.com

Hughes Hubbard & Reed LLP is a multinational law firm headquartered in New York City with offices in the United States, France, and Japan.

== History ==
The firm's history dates back to the late 19th century, when it counted among its partners future Chief Justice of the United States Charles Evans Hughes. Hughes Hubbard has practice areas in both the litigation and corporate fields.

=== 1871–1899 ===
- 1871 - In the wake of the Great Chicago Fire, Chicago-based lawyer Walter S. Carter had so many claims to prosecute involving insurers bankrupted by the fire that he moved his office to New York City. Faced with more business than he could personally handle, Carter tried hiring the most promising law students to help him and, in a departure from standard practice, paid these "associates" a salary. One of them was then-future Chief Justice of the Supreme Court Charles Evans Hughes.
- 1888 - Four years after joining the firm, then known as Chamberlain, Carter & Hornblower, Hughes was made partner, and the firm's name was changed to Carter, Hughes & Cravath.

=== 1900–1999 ===
- 1910 - After four years as governor of New York, Hughes was appointed to the Supreme Court by President William Howard Taft.
- 1916 - Hughes resigned from the Court to run for president against Woodrow Wilson. After he was defeated, Hughes rejoined his old partners and, with the exception of four years he served as Secretary of State under President Harding, he remained a partner in the firm until 1930.
- 1929 - Charles Evans Hughes, Jr. (1862–1948), also a partner in the firm, resigned to become US Solicitor General.
- 1930 - Hughes was appointed Chief Justice of the US Supreme Court. Upon his father's appointment, Charles Evans Hughes, Jr. resigned from his position as Solicitor General and rejoined the firm as a partner.
- 1937 - In June, the firm suddenly dissolved, due to what the media at the time reported was Charles Evans Hughes, Jr.'s desire to insulate his father from a political attack directed at one of Hughes, Jr.'s partners at the firm by Roosevelt's Secretary of the Treasury. On June 10 of that year, Hughes, Richards, Hubbard & Ewing opened its offices at One Wall Street, where it would remain for over 50 years.
- In the 1960s, Hughes Hubbard started representing Coopers & Lybrand, culminating in its multibillion-dollar merger with Price Waterhouse. Other clients who remained with the firm over multiple decades include Merck, BMI, Continental Airlines (now United), and Viacom.
- 1968 - The firm became Hughes Hubbard & Reed.
- In the 1970s, Hughes Hubbard defended Bristol Myers in an antitrust case and Ford Motor Company in Pinto fuel tank cases, which was the start of the firm's product liability practice.
- In the 1990s, Hughes Hubbard represented musician Bob Marley's widow against 11 people who alleged they were Marley's children and sought recovery from his estate.
- 1999 - The firm elected Candace Beinecke as Chair of the firm, making her the first woman to lead a major New York City law firm.

=== Since 2000 ===
- 2007 - Hughes Hubbard led the drafting of a $4.8 billion global settlement program to resolve over 99.9% of eligible Vioxx claims against its client Merck alleging heart attacks, ischemic strokes, and sudden cardiac death.
- 2008 - Hughes Hubbard partner James Giddens was appointed trustee for the $123 billion liquidation of Lehman Brothers, the largest bankruptcy in US history, and Hughes Hubbard was selected as his counsel. In the following years, Hughes Hubbard returned $110 billion to customers and general creditors.
- 2011 - Hughes Hubbard partner James Giddens was appointed trustee for the liquidation of MF Global, the eighth-largest bankruptcy in US history, and Hughes Hubbard was selected as his counsel. In the following years, Hughes Hubbard distributed $8.1 billion and achieved a full recovery for former customers and secured creditors and a 95% recovery for unsecured creditors.
- 2014 - Hughes Hubbard served as lead counsel to Merck in its acquisition of antibiotics maker Cubist Pharmaceuticals for $9.5 billion.
- 2015 - Hughes Hubbard represented Merck in a $3.8 billion deal to buy Idenix Pharmaceuticals, a biotechnology company.
- 2017 - Hughes Hubbard convinced federal prosecutors and the U.S. Securities and Exchange Commission to drop all criminal and civil charges against two former JPMorgan traders, concluding the four-year “London Whale” case.
- 2018 - Hughes Hubbard won the first of two arbitration proceedings at The Hague against the Russian Federation, following its 2014 invasion and occupation of Crimea. In 2022, the Court of Appeals of The Hague upheld jurisdictional awards rendered in both cases.
- 2021 - Hughes Hubbard advised Grab Holdings in its $40 billion merger with Altimeter Growth Corp. in the largest special-purpose acquisition company deal in the world to date.
- 2022 - Hughes Hubbard distributed final payout in the liquidation of Lehman Brothers, which remained the largest bankruptcy case in the world.
- 2023 - A Connecticut federal court tossed a United States Department of Justice criminal antitrust case, entering a judgment of acquittal for Hughes Hubbard client Harpreet Wasan immediately after the government rested.

== Rankings and reputation ==
According to the National Law Journal's 2023 NLJ 500 ranking of firms based on size, Hughes Hubbard & Reed has 218 attorneys and is ranked 195th in the United States. The firm placed 136th on The American Lawyer's 2023 Am Law 200 ranking. According to Law.com, the firm’s current revenue-per-lawyer is $1,181,000.

== Notable people ==
- George Davidson (born 1942), former President of the Legal Aid Society
- Oscar R. Ewing (1889–1980), vice chairman of the Democratic National Committee (1942–1947), administrator of the Federal Security Agency (1947–1953), and adviser to President Harry S Truman
- Charles Evans Hughes (1862–1948), Governor of New York (1907–10), Associate Justice of the Supreme Court of the United States (1910–1916), US Secretary of State (1921–1925) and Chief Justice of the United States (1930–1941)
- Charles Evans Hughes, Jr. (1889–1950), US Solicitor General (1929–1930)
- Amalya Lyle Kearse (born 1937), Judge on the US Court of Appeals for the Second Circuit (1979–present)
- Howard Matz (born 1943), former judge on the US District Court for the Central District of California (1998–2011)
- Powell Pierpoint (1922–1998), General Counsel of the Army (1961–1963)
- Abraham David Sofaer (born 1938), former judge on the US District Court for the Southern District of New York (1979–1985), then a legal adviser to the US State Department, before joining firm 1990–1999, and then a senior fellow at the Hoover Institution at Stanford University
- Mitchell Silk, former Assistant Secretary of the Treasury during the Trump administration.
- James W. Treffinger, former County Executive of Essex County, New Jersey (1995–2003)
- Tim Zagat (born 1940), restaurant critic
- Keisha A. McGuire (born 1982), Grenadian Permanent Representative to the United Nations
- Candace Beinecke (attorney) first female head of a major New York law firm.
- Ryan Fayhee, a DOJ Attorney from 2004 to 2015 - National Security Divison, Counterspionage Section. Since 2015 a private fraud investigator and hostage advocat.
