= Hamilton E. James =

American businessman (born 1951)

Tony James
- Born: Hamilton Evans James; February 3, 1951 (age 75); Wyandotte, Michigan, U.S.
- Education: Harvard University (BA, MBA)
- Title: Chairman of Costco
- Board member of: Metropolitan Museum of Art; Wildlife Conservation Society
- Spouse: Amabel George Boyce (m. 1973)
- Children: 3

Hamilton Evans "Tony" James (born February 3, 1951) is an American billionaire investor. He is the former president, chief operating officer, and executive vice chairman of Blackstone, a New York–based global asset management firm. James has been chairman of the multinational retail chain Costco since August 2017. Since 2021, he has been co-chair of the board of trustees of the Metropolitan Museum of Art in New York.

As of March 2024, Forbes estimated his net worth at US$4.2 billion.

== Early life and education ==
James is the son of Hamilton Renson James and Waleska James. He grew up as the oldest of four boys in Lincoln, Massachusetts, a suburb of Boston. His father was a management consultant, president of Arthur D. Little International, and a vice president of Arthur D. Little, Inc.

James attended the Choate School (now Choate Rosemary Hall) in Wallingford, Connecticut. James then attended Harvard College, where he was a John Harvard Scholar, and graduated magna cum laude in 1973. He earned a M.B.A. from Harvard Business School in 1975, where he was a Baker Scholar as well as a fullback on their nationally ranked soccer team.

== Banking ==
In 1975, James joined investment bank Donaldson, Lufkin & Jenrette (DLJ) and became head of its global mergers and acquisitions group in 1982. He founded DLJ Merchant Banking, Inc in 1985. In 1995, James was appointed chairman of the firm's banking group, a position he held when DLJ was acquired in 2000 by Credit Suisse First Boston (CSFB) and was a member of its board of directors. James was on the CSFB executive board and as chairman of global investment banking and private equity.

In 2025, James was honored by the Indian Institute of Management Bangalore with the establishment of the Tony James Centre for Private Equity and Venture Capital, an educational center meant to nurture future finance leaders through research, education, and industry events.

== Blackstone ==
In 2002, James joined Blackstone Inc, a global alternative asset managing firm, taking the post of president and COO. He also was on the firm's executive and management committees, and its board of directors. He organized the initial public offer that took the company public, and also managed the acquisition of GSO, its credit business, worth 178 billion dollars, and its secondaries arm, Strategic Partners. He also helped establish Blackstone's Tactical Opportunities section, which grew to have assets worth 34 billion dollars. Under James, Blackstone grew to an investment giant with $731 billion in assets.

Blackstone and James's name arose in a 2007 corporate collusion case, along with fellow private equity giants Bain Capital and Carlyle Group. These three rival firms were accused of colluding with each other to drive down the prices of takeover targets. The three firms agreed to pay a combined $325 million to settle the lawsuit, without admitting wrongdoing.

James also created a private equity trade group to lobby in Washington. It was initially called the Private Equity Council, but was later renamed the American Investment Council.

In August 2017, James was appointed chairman of the multinational retail chain Costco after the death of its co-founder and long-time chairman Jeffrey Brotman. James has been a Costco board director since 1988 and has been its lead independent director since 2005.

In December 2021, James announced his retirement from Blackstone Inc. and opened a family company, Jefferson River Capital.

== Politics and policy ==
James became a Democratic donor and fundraiser for Barack Obama. In May 2012, James hosted a fundraiser at his home in New York for Obama which raised more than $2 million for the president's reelection campaign. Obama offered James the job of Commerce Secretary but he ultimately turned it down. In 2020 he held a fundraiser for the presidential campaign of Joe Biden, which raised over two million dollars.

In 2015, James was appointed to the Port Authority Board of Commissioners. Critics pointed out his lack of experience with transportation issues, and charged that Blackstone had recently purchased half of fellow commissioner Scott Rechler's New York real estate portfolio.

In 2016, James co-authored a book, Rescuing Retirement, with Teresa Ghilarducci.

Since 2014, James has been a member of the board of the Center for American Progress (CAP), a progressive public policy research and advocacy organization.

In 2023, James was appointed by President Biden to the President's Intelligence Advisory Board.

== Health Care and AI ==
In 2019, James and his wife established the Hamilton and Amabel James Center for Artificial Intelligence at the Icahn School of Medicine at Mount Sinai. This first of its kind center in New York, opened in November 2024, focused on integrating artificial intelligence, data science and genomic screening to advance clinical practice and patient outcomes.

Healthcare innovation is the focus of James’ newly created biotech-focused investment fund, Jefferson Life Sciences, established in 2025. Through partnerships with established industry leaders, such as Character Biosciences, Fesarius Therapeutics, and Juvena Therapeutics, the fund aims to find new therapeutic solutions for patients.

== Philanthropy ==
James joined the board of trustees of the Metropolitan Museum in 2010, and became the chairman of the museum's finance committee in 2014. In 2020, as the museum struggled with a revenue loss of 150 million dollars due to the COVID-19 pandemic, James was named co-chair of the board of trustees, sharing the leadership with attorney Candace Beinecke, beginning in January 2021. This was the first time the museum has had two chairpersons.

In 2022, James became a Member of the Board of Trustees of The Partnership for Education Advancement (Ed Advancement), a non-profit dedicated to improving socioeconomic mobility for first-generation, low-income, and under-resourced students by investing in minority serving institutions.

In addition to the Metropolitan Museum, he was on the boards of several cultural and environmental organizations, including the Second Stage Theatre, Trout Unlimited, the Woods Hole Oceanographic Institute, the Wildlife Conservation Society, and Montana Land Reliance. He was formerly the chairman of the board of trustees of the American Ballet Theatre.

== Personal life ==
In August 1973, James married Amabel George Boyce, the daughter of John C.G. and Barbara Boyce of Lutherville, Maryland, and Wequetonsing, Michigan. They have three children.

In 2011, it was reported that James, after having lived at 1001 Park Avenue since the 1980s, spent $24.9 million on an apartment at 834 Fifth Avenue, New York City, previously owned by theater director and producer Hal Prince.
