= CBS Corporation =

American mass media company

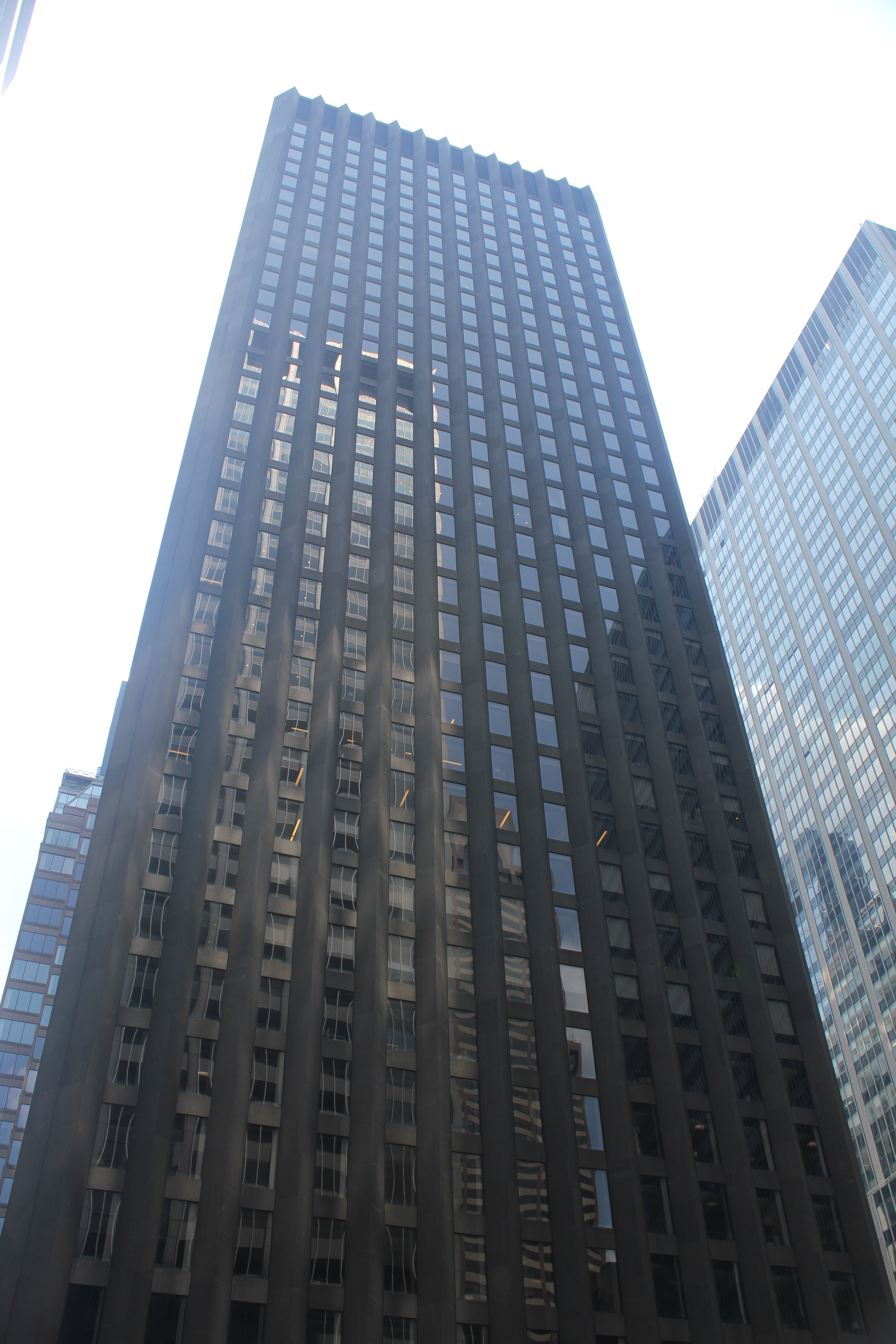
- Headquarters at the CBS Building in New York City
- Type: Public
- Traded as: NYSE: CBS.A (Class A); NYSE: CBS (Class B non voting)
- Industry: Mass media
- Predecessor: Westinghouse Electric Corporation (first incarnation); Viacom (second incarnation)
- Founded: November 30, 1997; 28 years ago (first incarnation); December 31, 2005; 20 years ago (second incarnation)
- Defunct: April 15, 2000; 26 years ago (first incarnation); December 4, 2019; 6 years ago (second incarnation)
- Fate: Acquired by and folded into the first incarnation of Viacom; Merged with the second incarnation of Viacom to form ViacomCBS (later Paramount Global)
- Successor: Viacom (first incarnation); Paramount Global (second incarnation)
- Headquarters: CBS Building, New York City, U.S.
- Area served: Worldwide, with main operations in the United States and Australia
- Key people: Strauss Zelnick (interim chairman); Joseph Ianniello (president and acting CEO)
- Products: Movie production, TV production, broadcasting, cable television, record label, publishing, Internet
- Revenue: ▲US$ 14.514 billion (2018)
- Operating income: ▼US$ 2.768 billion (2018)
- Net income: ▼US$ 1.960 billion (2018)
- Total assets: ▼US$ 21.86 billion (2018)
- Total equity: ▼US$ 2.80 billion (2018)
- Owner: National Amusements (80% voting power)
- Number of employees: ~12,700 (2017)
- Divisions: CBS Entertainment Group; CBS Cable Networks; CBS Local Media; Simon & Schuster; CBS Experiences
- Subsidiaries: CBS; CBS News; CBS Sports; CBS Films CBS Interactive; CBS Records; CBS Sports Network; CBS Television Distribution; CBS Television Studios; Showtime Networks; TV Guide (digital assets); The CW (50%); Pop TV
- Website: www.cbscorporation.com (archived Dec 4, 2019)
- Footnotes; Financials as of December 31, 2017. (Note: The Viacom-CBS split was structured in such a way that the first Viacom changed its name to CBS Corporation, while the second Viacom was an entirely spun-off company. For this reason, the rechristened CBS Corporation was actually the same company (Viacom) that was founded in 1986. The 1986 Viacom, in turn, was the successor to a previous company also known as Viacom and founded in 1971.)

CBS Corporation, commonly known as CBS Corp or simply CBS, was an American multinational media company with interests primarily in commercial broadcasting, publishing and television production. The first incarnation of the company was formed on November 30, 1997 as a renaming of Westinghouse Electric Corporation after they bought CBS two years earlier. It later merged with Viacom on April 15, 2000. The second incarnation was formed through a split from Viacom on December 31, 2005, alongside an entirely new Viacom; both the second CBS Corporation and the second Viacom were controlled by National Amusements, a theater company owned by billionaire Sumner Redstone.

CBS Corporation comprised the over-the-air television broadcasting (CBS and The CW (50% with Warner Bros. Entertainment)), television production and distribution, publishing, pay-cable and recording assets that were previously owned by the first Viacom. It was the world's eighth largest entertainment company in terms of revenue and headquartered at the CBS Building in Midtown Manhattan, New York City.

CBS Corporation announced on August 13, 2019, that it would merge with Viacom for the second time to form ViacomCBS (later Paramount Global). The merger was completed on December 4, 2019.

== History ==
=== Early history ===
Logo used from 1997 to 2000

The first incarnation of Viacom was created in 1952 as the television syndication division of CBS and was spun off in 1971. In late 1994, in a major change of direction, Westinghouse acquired the CBS television network and renamed itself CBS Corporation in 1997. Most of its remaining industrial businesses were sold off at this time. CBS Corporation was acquired by the first incarnation of Viacom in April 2000. The prior CBS Corporation also owned CMT and The Nashville Network (TNN), which remained Viacom properties after the 2005 split, but the prior CBS did not own UPN, Showtime, Paramount Television, Paramount Parks, or Simon & Schuster.

In March 2005, Viacom contemplated splitting the company into two publicly traded companies, amid issues of the stock price stagnating and clashing corporate cultures between the cable and broadcast divisions, which came to a head with the Super Bowl XXXVIII halftime show controversy a year previous with the MTV-produced show causing controversy for game broadcaster CBS.

On June 14, 2005, the Viacom board of directors approved the split of the company into two firms. The CBS Corporation name would be revived for one of the companies, to be headed by longtime television executive (and Viacom co-president) Les Moonves, and would include the namesake television network CBS, UPN, Infinity Broadcasting Corporation, Viacom Outdoor, Showtime Networks, and Paramount Television.

The split was structured such that the second Viacom was spun off from the first Viacom, which was renamed CBS Corporation. In a sense, this was a repeat of the 1971 spin-off. However, in this case, CBS retained virtually all of the prior firm's broadcast television assets, including its various syndication companies.

With the split, the two companies began trading on the New York Stock Exchange (NYSE) under the ticker symbols "CBS.A" and "CBS" (the latter symbol was previously used by CBS, Inc. as an independent company prior to its 1994 acquisition by Westinghouse) on January 2, 2006. Investors anticipated Viacom benefiting from the split, but instead, it dropped approximately 20%, while CBS Corporation rose 9%, that same year, Paramount Parks became a wholly owned theme park unit of CBS Corporation.

=== Subsequent developments ===
In January 2006, CBS and DIC Entertainment signed a multi-year deal in which DIC bought the Saturday morning airtime as "CBS's Saturday Morning Secret Slumber Party". In June 2006, DiC added a production partner AOL's KOL. Thus, this block would be called "KOL's Saturday Morning Secret Slumber Party on CBS".

On January 24, 2006, CBS Corporation and Time Warner created a new broadcast network, The CW. The network officially debuted on September 18, 2006. The CW formally debuted on September 20 with the 2-hour premiere of America's Next Top Model. The CW is the result of a merger of The WB (a Warner Bros. holding) and UPN (a CBS Corporation holding). CBS Corporation and Time Warner each owned 50% of The CW. Tribune Broadcasting (which previously owned a 25% stake on The WB) and CBS Television Stations contributed its stations as new network affiliates.

On May 23, 2006, CBS Corporation sold Paramount Parks to the Cedar Fair Entertainment Company. With this acquisition, Cedar Fair became the third-largest theme park operator. On June 30, 2006, Cedar Fair completed its acquisition of Paramount Parks from CBS Corporation in a cash transaction valued at US$1.24 billion. The transaction included a 10-year license that allowed Cedar Fair to use the Paramount name in the parks through the 2017 season.

On February 7, 2007, CBS sold seven smaller-market stations in Providence, Rhode Island, Austin, Texas, Salt Lake City, and West Palm Beach, Florida to Cerberus Capital Management for US$185 million. It sold another station, WFRV-TV in Green Bay, Wisconsin, and its satellite station, WJMN-TV in Escanaba, Michigan, to Liberty Media on February 13, 2007. News reports estimate the deal at about US$234 million. CBS is swapping the stations and US$170 million in cash for 7.59 million shares of CBS common stock held by Liberty Media.

On February 26, 2007, CBS began investing in Electric Sheep, which is a virtual world content developer. CBS hired Electric Sheep to develop some projects, including the creation of "The L-Word in Second Life". CBS also shot a commercial within the virtual world Second Life to promote its show Two and a Half Men. Another project that Electric Sheep was working on for CBS was a Star Trek-themed area in Second Life. By investing in Electric Sheep, CBS hoped to expand its activity "beyond the living room". On March 20, CBS/CSTV had acquired MaxPreps, an online high school sports network. On April 12, CBS Corporation created the CBS Interactive Audience Network. On May 30, 2007, CBS Interactive bought Last.fm for £140 million.

On May 15, 2008, CBS Interactive agreed to buy CNET Networks for $1.8 billion, with the deal due to close in the third quarter of 2008. On July 2 CBS acquired CNET and put it under CBS Interactive.

On February 14, 2013, CBS acquired a minority stake in AXS TV in exchange for programming and marketing. On March 26, CBS and Lionsgate entered a 50/50 joint venture to operate the TV Guide Network (TVGN) and TVGuide.com. On May 31, CBS bought the remaining half of TV Guide Digital from Lionsgate. The latter still retained its share of TVGN (later rebranded as Pop) until it was acquired by CBS on March 12, 2019. On July 16, CBS agreed to sell CBS Outdoor International to Platinum Equity for about $225 million. The CBS Outdoor division began trading as a separate company on the NYSE under "CBSO" on March 28, 2014. CBS Outdoor would be fully divested from CBS by July into an independent real estate investment trust, renamed as Outfront Media.

On November 17, 2017, CBS Corporation sold CBS Radio to Entercom, making that company the second-largest owner of radio stations in the United States. In the same year, CBS purchased Australian broadcaster Network 10. The network was previously in voluntary administration.

As of November 2018, CBS Corporation ranked 197th on the Fortune 500 list of the largest United States corporations by revenue. CBS Corp. sold Television City to Los Angeles real estate investment company Hackman Capital Partners for $750 million in a deal finalized in mid-December 2018. The deal gives the buyer the right to use the Television City name. Programs produced at Television City will continue to be based there as will CBS' international unit headquarters.

=== Re-merger deal with Viacom ===
On September 29, 2016, National Amusements sent a letter to CBS Corporation and Viacom, encouraging the two companies to merge back into one company. On December 12, the deal was called off.

On January 12, 2018, CNBC reported that Viacom had re-entered talks to merge back into CBS Corporation, after AT&T's purchase of Time Warner was planned and Disney's plan to acquire bulk of 21st Century Fox assets and the heavy competition from companies such as Netflix and Amazon. Shortly afterward, it was reported that the combined company could be a suitor for acquiring the film studio Lionsgate (which handled US distribution and global sales for CBS Films). A re-merger could benefit CBS's streaming service CBS All Access, as it could potentially have access to content from core Viacom brands such as Comedy Central, MTV, and Nickelodeon, as well as the Paramount Pictures library. Viacom's international presence could also benefit distribution.

On March 30, 2018, CBS made an all-stock offer slightly below Viacom's market value and insisting that its existing leadership, including long-time chairman and CEO Les Moonves, oversee the re-combined company. Viacom rejected the offer as being too low, requesting an increase by $2.8 billion, and requesting that Bob Bakish be maintained as president and COO under Moonves. It was reported these conflicts had resulted from Shari Redstone seeking more control over CBS and its leadership.

Eventually, on May 14, 2018, CBS Corporation sued National Amusements and accused Shari Redstone of abusing her voting power and forcing a merger that was not supported by it or Viacom. CBS also accused Redstone of discouraging Verizon Communications from acquiring it, which could have been beneficial to its shareholders.

On May 23, 2018, Les Moonves stated that he considered the Viacom channels to be an "albatross," and while he favored more content for CBS All Access (now Paramount+), he believed that there were better deals for CBS than the Viacom deal, such as Metro-Goldwyn-Mayer (MGM), Lionsgate or Sony Pictures. Moonves also considered Bakish a threat as he never wanted an ally of Shari Redstone as a board member of the combined company. Following Moonves' resignation due to sexual harassment allegations, National Amusements agreed in September 2018 to defer any proposal of a CBS-Viacom merger for at least two years after the date of the settlement with former CEO Moonves, donating $20 million to groups supporting the #MeToo movement as result of his resign.

On May 30, 2019, CNBC reported that CBS Corporation and Viacom would explore merger discussions in mid-June 2019. The company's board of directors was revamped with people who are open to a merger and the talks were made possible with the resignation of Moonves, who opposed all attempts for a Viacom merger. The talks had started following rumors of CBS acquiring Starz from Lionsgate. Reports said that CBS and Viacom reportedly set August 8 as an informal deadline for reaching an agreement to recombine the two media companies. As part of the re-merger deal, CBS acquired Viacom for up to $15.4 billion.

On August 13, 2019, CBS and Viacom agreed to merge into a new entity known as ViacomCBS (now Paramount Global), with Viacom CEO Bob Bakish as president and CEO of the new company and CBS CEO Ianniello as chairman and CEO of CBS and oversee CBS-branded assets. Shari Redstone will also serve as chairwoman of ViacomCBS. On October 29, 2019, National Amusements approved the re-merger deal, to be completed by early December 2019, with the recombined company trading on Nasdaq under the symbol "VIAC" and "VIACA" after CBS delist its shares on the NYSE. On December 4, the deal was completed, with the merger structured such that CBS Corporation absorbed Viacom and changed its name to ViacomCBS.

== Corporate governance ==
The board of directors of CBS Corporation included:

- Candace K. Beinecke
- Barbara M. Byrne
- Gary L. Countryman
- Brian Goldner
- Linda M. Griego
- Robert N. Klieger
- Martha L. Minow
- Shari Redstone (vice-chair)
- Sumner Redstone (chairman emeritus)
- Susan Schuman
- Frederick O. Terrell
- Strauss Zelnick (interim chairman)

== See also ==
- Westinghouse Electric Corporation, an old instance of the company, purchased by the old Viacom in 1999.
- CBS Television Stations, the holding company that assumes operation of CBS Corp.'s television stations.
- Concentration of media ownership and Media conglomerate
- MTV Networks/BET Networks, part of the new Paramount Global corporation.
