= H. Stuart Hughes =

American historian

- Born: Henry Stuart Hughes; May 16, 1916; New York City, US
- Died: October 21, 1999 (aged 83); San Diego, California, US
- Spouses: Suzanne Rufenacht (m. 1950; div. 1963); Judy Hughes (m. 1964)
- Parent: Charles Evans Hughes Jr.

Academic background
- Education: Amherst College; Harvard University
- Thesis: The Crisis of the Imperial French Economy, 1810–1812 (1940)
- Doctoral advisor: Donald Cope McKay
- Influences: A. L. Kroeber

Academic work
- Discipline: History
- Institutions: Brown University; Harvard University; Stanford University; University of California, San Diego
- Doctoral students: Martin Jay; Charles S. Maier; John E. Toews

Henry Stuart Hughes (1916–1999) was an American historian, professor, and activist. He advocated the application of psychoanalysis to history.

== Early life ==
Hughes was born on May 16, 1916, in New York City, the son of Marjory Bruce Stuart and Charles Evans Hughes Jr. He was the grandson of Chief Justice of the United States Charles Evans Hughes, the 1916 Republican Party nominee for President, and claimed in his memoirs to have been used as a "campaign baby" as an infant. His father left for World War I while Stuart was still an infant, returning a year later when his son was three. Stuart was his parents' second child and second son, born 14 months after his elder brother, Charles Evans Hughes III. Two daughters were born later.

In 1922, Hughes's family moved to suburban Riverdale, Bronx, New York, where he spent most of his childhood. This was interrupted in early 1929, when Hughes's father was appointed United States Solicitor General by the new president, Herbert Hoover. The family's stay in Washington, D.C., was relatively brief; Charles Hughes Jr. was compelled to resign as Solicitor General when his father was appointed Chief Justice of the United States upon the death of William Howard Taft in 1930. He moved his family back to New York. Stuart was soon sent to boarding school at Deerfield Academy. He then attended Amherst College from 1933 to 1937. While in college, Hughes spent two summers in Germany in summer study programs.

== Early career ==
Hughes then attended graduate school at Harvard University, where he wrote his thesis, The Crisis of the Imperial French Economy, 1810–1812. He was in Paris working on his thesis when World War II started on September 1, 1939. Hughes soon returned to Cambridge.

With his new PhD, Hughes was appointed a junior faculty member at Brown University. He remained there only briefly before enlisting in the United States Army as a private. The army soon recognized that a historian who was fluent in French and German would be of more use in military intelligence than in the field artillery. Soon after the attack on Pearl Harbor, he was commissioned as an officer, initially as a second lieutenant, in what was soon to become the Office of Strategic Services. During the war, he served as an intelligence analyst whose work was generally well received, despite his association with political views that were, especially in the context of the United States military establishment of the time, decidedly left wing.

Hughes, by then a lieutenant colonel, was honorably discharged from active duty in 1946 and was soon reassigned as a civilian intelligence analyst, returning to Europe. In this role, he befriended the pioneering black State Department official Ralph Bunche. In the State Department, Hughes bemoaned the rise of the Cold War mentality. In late 1947, he left to return to Harvard as an instructor and as the associate director of its new Russian Research Center. However, Hughes felt that he unwittingly sabotaged his career there by his early support for former Vice President Henry Wallace for president in 1948. In 1950, Hughes married Suzanne Rufenacht, a member of a wealthy and influential French Protestant family. Failing to be published as a historian at a level sufficient to allow him to be promoted at Harvard at that time, and somewhat ostracized for his activism, Hughes left Harvard for Stanford University in 1952, at the height of the McCarthy era.

== Acclaim and activism ==
While in California, Hughes published at a level sufficient to encourage Harvard to recall him, in 1957. During his second stay at Harvard, Hughes became involved with SANE (then the Committee for a Sane Nuclear Policy, now Peace Action). Early in this period, he also engaged in a series of debates with a young Harvard professor of government, Henry Kissinger. In 1962, Hughes filed as an independent candidate for the final two years of the unexpired US Senate term of President John F. Kennedy. The major-party candidates were the Democratic Party members Edward M. Kennedy (the President's youngest brother) and Eddie McCormack (a nephew of the Speaker of the House) and the Republican George C. Lodge. Hughes collected well over the 72,000 signatures then required under Massachusetts law for placement on the ballot as an independent candidate; the September Democratic primary eliminated McCormack from further contention.

For most of the campaign, Hughes was taken seriously, even engaging in two televised debates with Lodge. (Kennedy, by then an overwhelming favorite, declined to participate.) Any chance that Hughes might have had of winning the election or even receiving widespread support was destroyed in the aftermath of the Cuban Missile Crisis, only weeks before the election, in which the President and his brother Robert F. Kennedy took the nation "to the brink" of nuclear confrontation with the Soviet Union. A candidate favoring nuclear disarmament suddenly seemed unrealistic and out of touch; Hughes received less than two per cent of the vote and far fewer votes than he previously had signatures. Edward M. Kennedy won the election resoundingly and served in the seat until his death in 2009.

== Support of psychoanalysis and psychohistory ==
As a beneficiary of it, Hughes saw the value of psychoanalysis. His widow, Judith Hughes, is a European historian and psychoanalyst. In the words of his wife, he "could not have lived the life he did, at least the last 40-plus years of it, without benefit of psychoanalysis."

As a historian Hughes saw enormous value of the Freudian world view applied to history. In Gentleman Rebel he reported being close to his Harvard colleague Erik Erikson and serving in the "supporting cast" of psychohistory. When Richard Schoenwald established the first psychohistory newsletter (the predecessor to The Psychohistory Review), Hughes made serious contributions and encouraged the new and bold direction of the publication.

An important bibliographer of psychohistory, William Gilmore, calls "History and Psychoanalysis: The Explanation of Motive," in Hughes' book, History as Art and as Science (1964), an indispensable "classic" and "must reading." Hughes's memoirs are particularly revealing, as he does not begin his account with any mention of his distinguished family, but instead with a question from his psychoanalyst, Avery Weisman.

== Later career ==
Early in 1963, Hughes and Suzanne filed for divorce. In the fall of 1963, Hughes agreed to become co-chairman of the SANE organization, alongside renowned pediatrician and fellow activist Benjamin Spock. In March 1964, Hughes married his second wife, Judy, whom he initially had met as one of his graduate school students. As SANE expanded its anti-nuclear activities to include anti-Vietnam War activism, Hughes was branded by the State Department's Passport Office as a potential subversive. He also found himself in an increasingly isolated position on the Harvard faculty, opposed to both the Vietnam War and also many of the actions that began to be taken in opposition to it. Hughes, however, served as the sole chairman of SANE from 1967 to 1970 after Spock resigned his co-chairmanship.

Hughes also became associated with male support for feminism. In part, this seems to have been prompted by his perception of academic discrimination against his wife after she had earned her own doctorate. It was this discrimination that, in large measure, seems to have led to the Hugheses' departure from Harvard for the University of California at San Diego; unlike his first departure from Harvard, it could not now be linked to any failure to have been sufficiently published. They moved to San Diego in 1975; Hughes taught at UCSD until taking emeritus status in 1989 and died in La Jolla, a section of San Diego and site of the UCSD campus, following a protracted illness, on October 21, 1999.

== Books ==
- An Essay for Our Times, New York: Alfred A. Knopf, 1950. ISBN 0-374-94032-0.
- Oswald Spengler: A Critical Estimate, New York: Charles Scribner's Sons, 1952. ISBN 0-8371-8214-X.
- The United States and Italy. Cambridge: Harvard Press, 1953. ISBN 0-674-92545-9.
- Consciousness and Society: The Reorientation of European Social Thought. Cambridge: Harvard University Press, 1958. ISBN 0-674-70728-1.
- Contemporary Europe: A History. Englewood Cliffs, N.J.: Prentice-Hall, 1961. ISBN 0-13-291840-4.
- An Approach to Peace, and Other Essays. Atheneum, 1962. ASIN B0007DFG2V.
- History as Art and as Science: Twin Vistas on the Past, New York: Harper & Row, 1964.
- The Obstructed Path: French Social Thought in the Years of Desperation 1930-1960, New York: Harper & Row, 1968.
- The Sea Change: The Migration of Social Thought, 1930-1965, New York: Harper & Row, 1975.
- Prisoners of Hope: The Silver Age of the Italian Jews, 1924–1974. Cambridge: Harvard University Press, 1983. ISBN 0-674-70727-3.
- Between Commitment and Disillusion, 1987, comprising two earlier works (and with a new introduction):

The Obstructed Path, 1968, and The Sea Change, 1975; Wesleyan University Press, 1987 ISBN 0-8195-5136-8 [hc], 0-8195-6193-2 [pb].

- Sophisticated Rebels: The Political Culture of European Dissent, 1968–1987, Cambridge: Harvard University Press, 1988. ISBN 0-674-82130-0.
- Gentleman Rebel: The Memoirs of H. Stuart Hughes, New York: Ticknor & Fields, 1990. ISBN 0-395-56316-X. A memoir.

Note: ISBNs referenced are to editions currently available and may not be the same as the ISBNs assigned to the first editions of his works.
