= Fennis Augustine =

Grenadian High Commissioner and Politician

Fennis Augustine (1930—23 December 1993) was a member of the New Jewel Movment and The People’s Revolutionary Government (PRG) of Grenada’s High Commissioner to the UK.

== Revolution and Government work ==
Fennis Augustine was originally a trade union shop steward and an activist in the West Indian Standing Conference, before going on to join the NJM. Augustine served as Grenada’s High Commissioner to the UK between 1979 and 1983 during the PRG era, during his tenure he was responsible for strengthening relations with Margaret Thatcher’s government in the UK. He returned to Grenada after the US invasion. Augustine founded a small Social Democratic Wing of the NJM in 1984 after the fall of the PRG. Augustine disagreed with the Marxist groups and members of the NJM, and therefore he did not join a Maurice Bishop dedicated group that was run by NJM Marxists. In Early 1989, Augustine became the Co-leader of the Grenada People’s Movement (GPM) along with Dr. Rafael Fletcher.

== Later Life ==
Fennis Augustine died on the 23 December 1993 in Grenada, aged 63 years old.
