= William D. Mitchell =

54th U.S. Attorney General

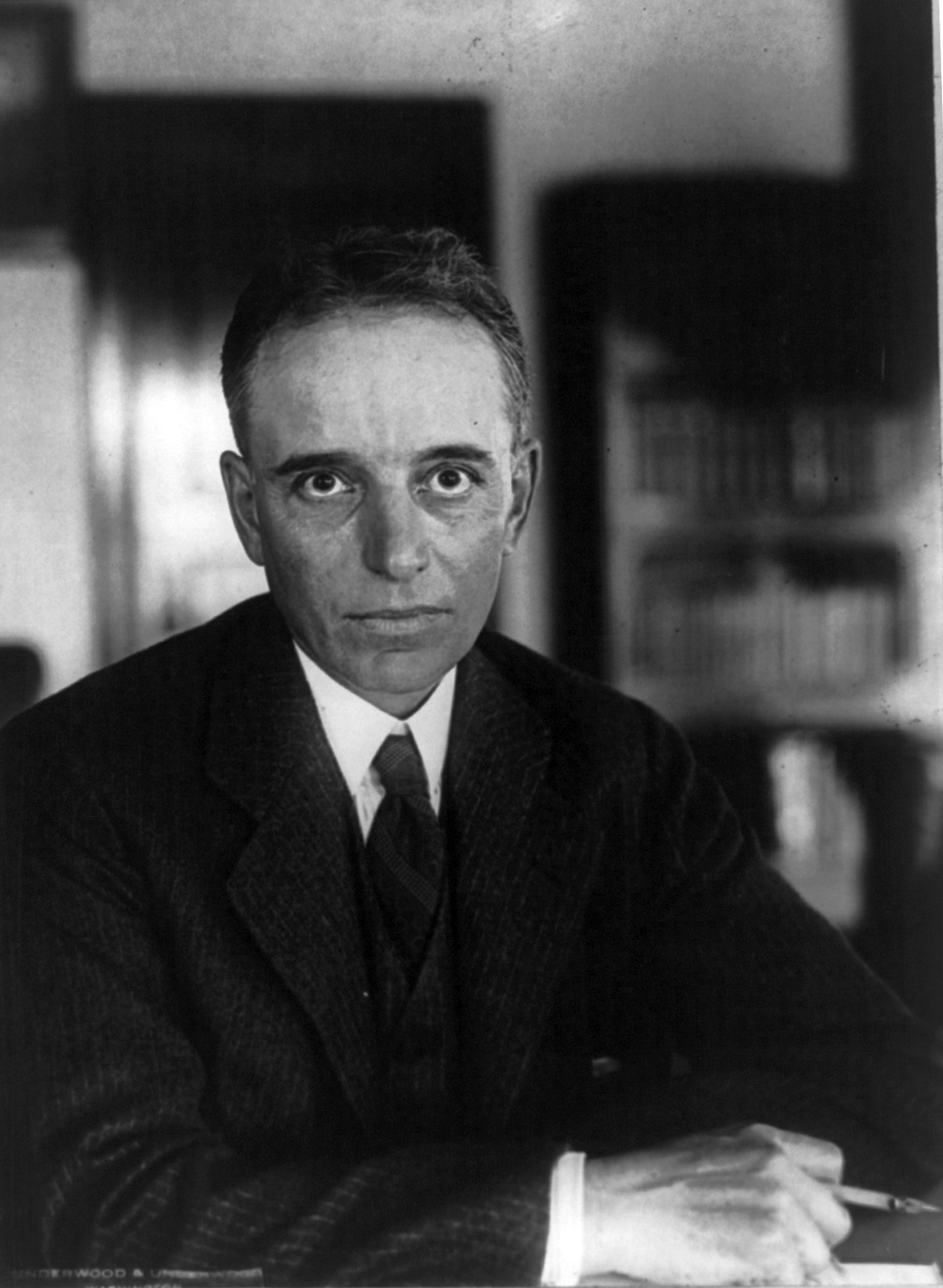
- Mitchell in 1925

54th United States Attorney General
- In office March 4, 1929 – March 4, 1933
- President: Herbert Hoover
- Preceded by: John G. Sargent
- Succeeded by: Homer Cummings

18th United States Solicitor General
- In office June 4, 1925 – March 4, 1929
- President: Calvin Coolidge
- Preceded by: James M. Beck
- Succeeded by: Charles Evans Hughes Jr.

Personal details
- Born: William DeWitt Mitchell; September 9, 1874 Winona, Minnesota, U.S.
- Died: August 24, 1955 (aged 80) Syosset, New York, U.S.
- Resting place: Oakland Cemetery, Saint Paul, Minnesota
- Party: Republican
- Spouse: Gertrude Bancroft (m. 1901)
- Children: 2
- Education: Yale University (attended); University of Minnesota (AB, LLB)

Military service
- Branch/service: United States Army; Minnesota Army National Guard
- Years of service: 1898-1918
- Rank: Colonel
- Unit: 15th Minnesota Volunteer Infantry Regiment; United States Second Army Corps; 3rd Brigade of the 1st Infantry Division; 4th Infantry Regiment (National Guard); 6th Infantry Regiment (National Guard)
- Battles/wars: Spanish–American War; World War I

William DeWitt Mitchell (September 9, 1874 – August 24, 1955) was an American attorney who had served as both Solicitor General of the United States under President Calvin Coolidge and United States Attorney General under President Herbert Hoover.

== Early life and education ==
William DeWitt Mitchell was born in Winona, Minnesota, to William B. Mitchell, a jurist who served as an associate justice of the Minnesota Supreme Court, and Frances Merritt. He attended public schools in Winona before completing his preparatory education at the Lawrenceville School. In 1891, Mitchell enrolled in the Sheffield Scientific School at Yale University to study electrical engineering. Despite excelling in mathematics and science, he shifted his focus to law after two years and transferred to the University of Minnesota. To make up for lost time, he attended law classes at night while completing his undergraduate degree.

Mitchell graduated from the University of Minnesota with a Bachelor of Arts degree in 1895 and subsequently enrolled at the University of Minnesota Law School, earning a Bachelor of Laws degree in 1896. Shortly after graduating from law school, he was admitted to the Minnesota State Bar Association and began practicing law in Saint Paul. He married Gertrude Bancroft on June 27, 1901, and the couple had two sons: William and Bancroft Mitchell.

== Career ==
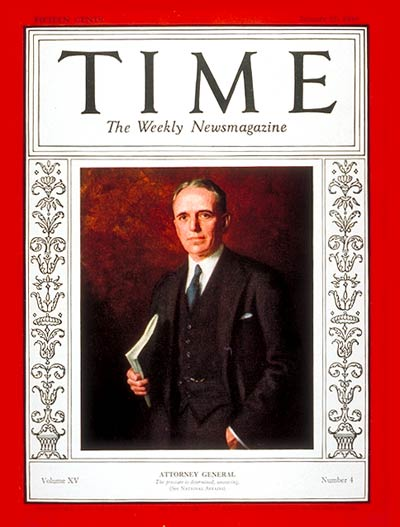
Time magazine cover of William D. Mitchell, (January 27, 1930).

He formed the law firm of How, Taylor & Mitchell, which became prominent in the Midwest. This prestige allowed Mitchell access to both the regional council of the U.S. Railroad Administration in 1919, and then he served as chairman of the Citizens Charter Committee of St. Paul in 1922.

=== Military service ===
He served as a line officer with the 15th Minnesota Volunteer Infantry Regiment and later an acting judge advocate for the United States Second Army Corps during the Spanish–American War. From 1899 to 1901 he was an engineer officer for the 3rd Brigade of the 1st Infantry Division and later adjutant for the 4th Infantry Regiment of the Minnesota Army National Guard. During the First World War he served with the 6th Infantry Regiment of the Minnesota Army National Guard and later served at Camp Taylor, Kentucky until the war was over. He reached the rank of Colonel.

=== Government service ===
His combined military service placed him in position to be appointed to the position of Solicitor General of the United States on June 5, 1925. Having served well in his position, President Hoover appointed him Attorney General of the United States from March 4, 1929, and he held that office until March 4, 1933, one of his principal acts having been to order the Bonus Army dispersed and their camp destroyed.

== Later career ==
Mitchell then settled in New York City where he practiced law. He was named chairman of the Committee on Federal Rules of Civil Procedure, and chief counsel of the joint congressional committee investigating the attack on Pearl Harbor.

Mitchell died there in Syosset, New York on August 24, 1955, at the age of 80.

Legal offices
| Preceded by James M. Beck | Solicitor General; 1925–1929 | Succeeded by Charles Evans Hughes, Jr. |
| Preceded by John G. Sargent | U.S. Attorney General; Served under: Herbert Hoover; 1929–1933 | Succeeded by Homer S. Cummings |
