= Permanent Representative of Grenada to the United Nations =

Coordinates: 40.750041°N 73.971660°W

- Inaugural holder: Marie J. Mclntyre
- Formation: November 29, 1974

The Grenadian Permanent Representative to the United Nations in New York City is the official representative of the Government in St. George's, Grenada to the Headquarters of the United Nations.

== History ==
- On September 17, 1974 Grenada was admitted to the United Nations.

== List of representatives ==
| Diplomatic Agrément | Diplomatic accreditation | ambassador | Observations | List of heads of government of Grenada | Secretary-General of the United Nations | Term end |
|---|---|---|---|---|---|---|
| September 17, 1974 | September 18, 1974 | Marie J. Mclntyre | | Eric Gairy | Kurt Waldheim | July 11, 1977 |
| July 4, 1977 | July 21, 1977 | Franklyn O'Brien Dolland | | Eric Gairy | Kurt Waldheim | June 30, 1978 |
| June 4, 1978 | July 14, 1978 | George Ashley Griffith | | Eric Gairy | Kurt Waldheim | March 15, 1979 |
| March 11, 1979 | April 11, 1979 | Bernard Kendrick Radix | | Maurice Bishop | Kurt Waldheim | July 29, 1980 |
| August 28, 1980 | September 2, 1980 | Caldwell Taylor | | Maurice Bishop | Kurt Waldheim | December 31, 1983 |
| December 23, 1983 | | Gloria Payne Banfield | Chargé d'affaires, In February 2003 Gloria Payne-Banfield succeeded Baptiste as Grenada United Labor Party leader, in preparation for legislative elections, | Nicholas Brathwaite | Javier Pérez de Cuéllar | December 31, 1990 |
| January 18, 1985 | May 10, 1985 | Lamuel A. Stanislaus | | Herbert Blaize | Javier Pérez de Cuéllar | June 30, 1990 |
| July 1, 1990 | July 16, 1990 | Eugene M. Pursoo | | Nicholas Brathwaite | Javier Pérez de Cuéllar | July 6, 1995 |
| August 1, 1995 | September 19, 1995 | Robert E. Millette | | George Brizan | Boutros Boutros-Ghali | November 30, 1998 |
| December 18, 1998 | December 21, 1998 | Lamuel A. Stanislaus | | Keith Claudius Mitchell | Kofi Annan | November 8, 2004 |
| October 27, 2004 | November 5, 2004 | Ruth Elizabeth Rouse | | Keith Claudius Mitchell | Kofi Annan | January 31, 2007 |
| February 1, 2007 | February 7, 2007 | Ethelstan Angus Friday | | Keith Claudius Mitchell | Ban Ki-moon | October 10, 2008 |
| January 13, 2009 | February 17, 2009 | Dessima Williams | | Tillman Thomas | Ban Ki-moon | April 30, 2013 |
| August 30, 2013 | September 13, 2013 | Denis Godwin Antoine | | Keith Claudius Mitchell | Ban Ki-moon | January 8, 2016 |
| | April 12, 2016 | Keisha A. McGuire | From 2012 to 2016 she was an associate in the litigation department of Hughes Hubbard & Reed LLP. Based in Miami, Florida, she represented clients in securities, product liability and complex commercial disputes.; In 2006, and again from 2007 to 2011, she was an associate at Hogan Lovells US LLP, representing domestic and international clients in securities, receivership, construction and aviation. | Keith Claudius Mitchell | Ban Ki-moon | June 24, 2022 |
