= Manufacturers Trust Company Building =

Commercial building in Manhattan, New York

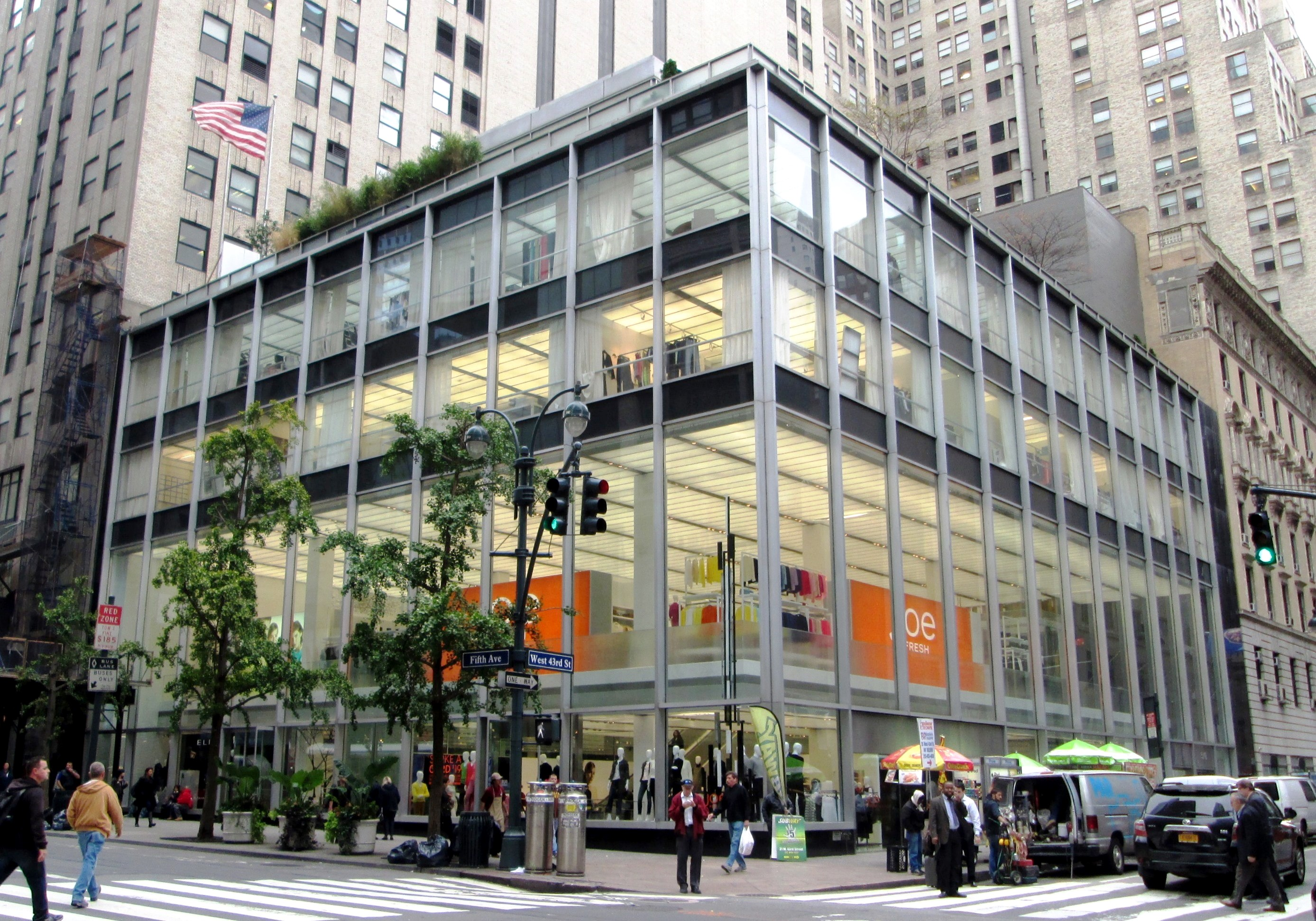
- Front of the building in October 2013
- Interactive map of the Manufacturers Trust Company Building area
- Former names: Manufacturers Hanover Trust Company Building

General information
- Architectural style: International Style
- Location: 510 Fifth Avenue, Manhattan, New York, United States
- Coordinates: 40°45′15″N 73°58′51″W
- Construction started: 1953
- Completed: 1954
- Owner: Reuben Brothers

Technical details
- Floor count: 5 (+1 basement)

Design and construction
- Architects: Charles Evans Hughes III and Gordon Bunshaft of Skidmore, Owings & Merrill
- Known for: First bank branch in the United States to be built in the International Style

New York City Landmark
- Designated: October 21, 1997
- Reference no.: 1968
- Designated entity: Exterior

New York City Landmark
- Designated: February 15, 2011
- Reference no.: 2467
- Designated entity: First- and second-story interior

The Manufacturers Trust Company Building, also known as 510 Fifth Avenue, is a commercial building at the southwest corner of West 43rd Street and Fifth Avenue in Midtown Manhattan, New York City, United States. Opened in 1954, it is the first bank branch in the United States to be built in the International Style. Charles Evans Hughes III and Gordon Bunshaft of Skidmore, Owings & Merrill (SOM) designed the building for the Manufacturers Trust Company. The structure has four full stories, a penthouse, and a basement. The facade is made largely of glass panes and aluminum mullions. The first story includes a door for the bank vault, designed by Henry Dreyfuss and visible from the street. The second story, recessed from the facade, has a luminous ceiling. The building's height and design were influenced by a lease restriction that prohibited the construction of a taller building on a portion of the site. A smaller penthouse rises above the fourth story.

The building was commissioned by Manufacturers Trust in 1944; the original plan was designed by Walker & Gillette and canceled in 1948. Walker & Poor was hired in 1950 to modify the original proposal but was replaced with consulting architect SOM. The building was instantly popular upon its opening, becoming one of Manufacturers Trust's busiest branches and a tourist attraction in itself. Manufacturers Trust's successor, Chase Bank, sold the building in 2000 to Tahl-Propp Equities. After Vornado Realty Trust bought the building in 2010, the Chase branch closed that year. SOM renovated 510 Fifth Avenue in 2012, converting it into a commercial structure, and Reuben Brothers acquired the property in 2023.

The building was praised for the design of its facade, ceiling lighting, and visible vault door, and the design inspired other bank buildings erected in the 1950s and 1960s. The building's facade was designated as an official landmark by the New York City Landmarks Preservation Commission (LPC) in 1997, and its interior was similarly designated in 2011.

== Site ==
510 Fifth Avenue occupies the southwestern corner of Fifth Avenue and 43rd Street in the Midtown Manhattan neighborhood of New York City, United States. The lot, with an area of 12,500 square feet (1,200 m^{2}; 0.29 acres), is rectangular, measuring 100 feet (30 m) along Fifth Avenue and 125 feet (38 m) along West 43rd Street. It sits between 500 Fifth Avenue immediately to the south, 520 Fifth Avenue and the Century Association Building to the north, and the Salmon Tower Building to the west. Because the building is surrounded by skyscrapers, it received only small amounts of sunlight daily when it was built.

The site was previously occupied by two structures: the Ziegler Building and a rowhouse at 508 Fifth Avenue. The Ziegler Building, an eight-story edifice, was built in 1900 upon the lots at 510–514 Fifth Avenue, at the southwest corner of 43rd Street. It contained offices for accountants, brokers, and lawyers, along with that of tobacconist Alfred Dunhill. 508 Fifth Avenue, originally a rowhouse, became a commercial structure in the early 20th century, housing tenants such as the Gotham Silk Hosiery Company and the candy store Huyler's.

== Architecture ==
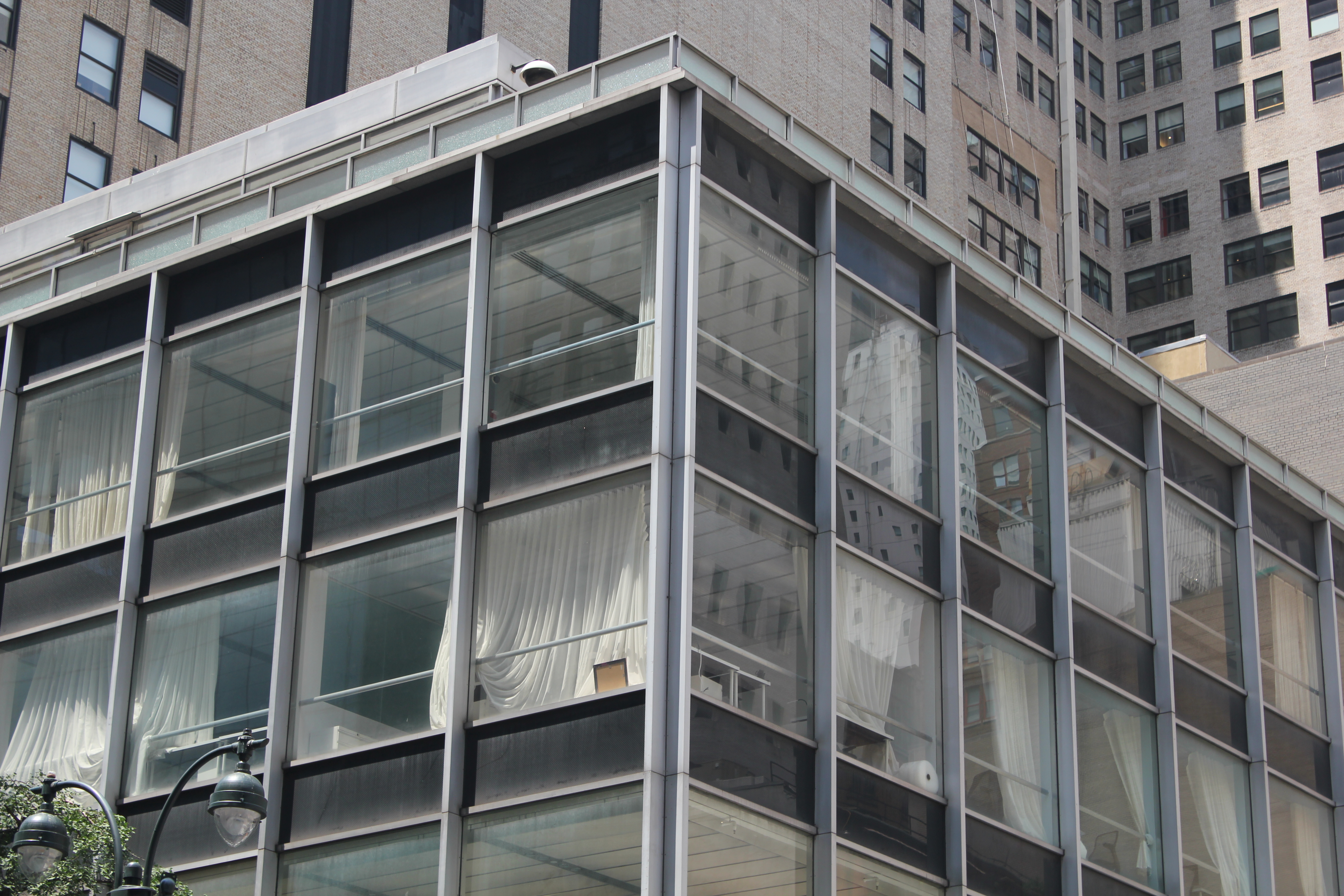
Glass panels at the corner of 43rd Street and Fifth Avenue

510 Fifth Avenue, built in the International Style as a bank for the Manufacturers Trust Company, was designed by Charles Evans Hughes III and Gordon Bunshaft of Skidmore, Owings & Merrill (SOM). SOM had hosted an internal design competition, which Hughes had won. SOM senior architect Bunshaft and project coordinator William S. Brown were given responsibility for the project, and Hughes's involvement beyond the design competition is unclear. Patricia W. Swan led the design team in collaboration with Bunshaft and Roy O. Allen; Eleanor H. Le Maire was the interior designer, and Harry Bertoia was hired to create artwork for the interior.

The building is the first International Style bank branch in the United States. Earlier bank branches across the U.S. had been designed with similar modern features, but also retained more traditional designs. According to Horace C. Flanigan, the president of Manufacturers Trust, the design was intended to convey a "sense of stability and security" while using modern materials. A press release, issued when the branch opened in 1954, said that the design would advertise itself; Bunshaft compared the high-capacity layout to that of a store. Architectural Forum described the building as an example of "a dynamic new kind of prestige design for large financial institutions", through the "lavishness" of its architecture.

=== Form ===
The Manufacturers Trust Company Building is five stories tall. The lower four stories occupy the entire lot; the penthouse is recessed from all sides except its western. The penthouse is T-shaped, with a mechanical section on its western side, and a narrower office section extending east. The building is 74 feet (23 m) tall, including the penthouse roof.

The building's height was affected by an agreement with Walter J. Salmon Sr., who had developed the adjacent 500 Fifth Avenue. Salmon had leased the site at 508 Fifth Avenue and used its air development rights to make his skyscraper larger. As such, any building there could not rise higher than 63 feet (19 m) tall or obstruct the adjacent skyscraper. (Note: The height restriction, which only applied to the land lot at 508 Fifth Avenue, expired at the end of Salmon's lease in 1965. Structures on the lots at 510–514 Fifth Avenue could be taller than that. The New York City Landmarks Preservation Commission also cites a figure of 68 feet (21 m) for the height restriction.) At the site formerly occupied by 508 Fifth Avenue, the penthouse is set back from the lot line because it rises above the maximum height.

=== Facade ===
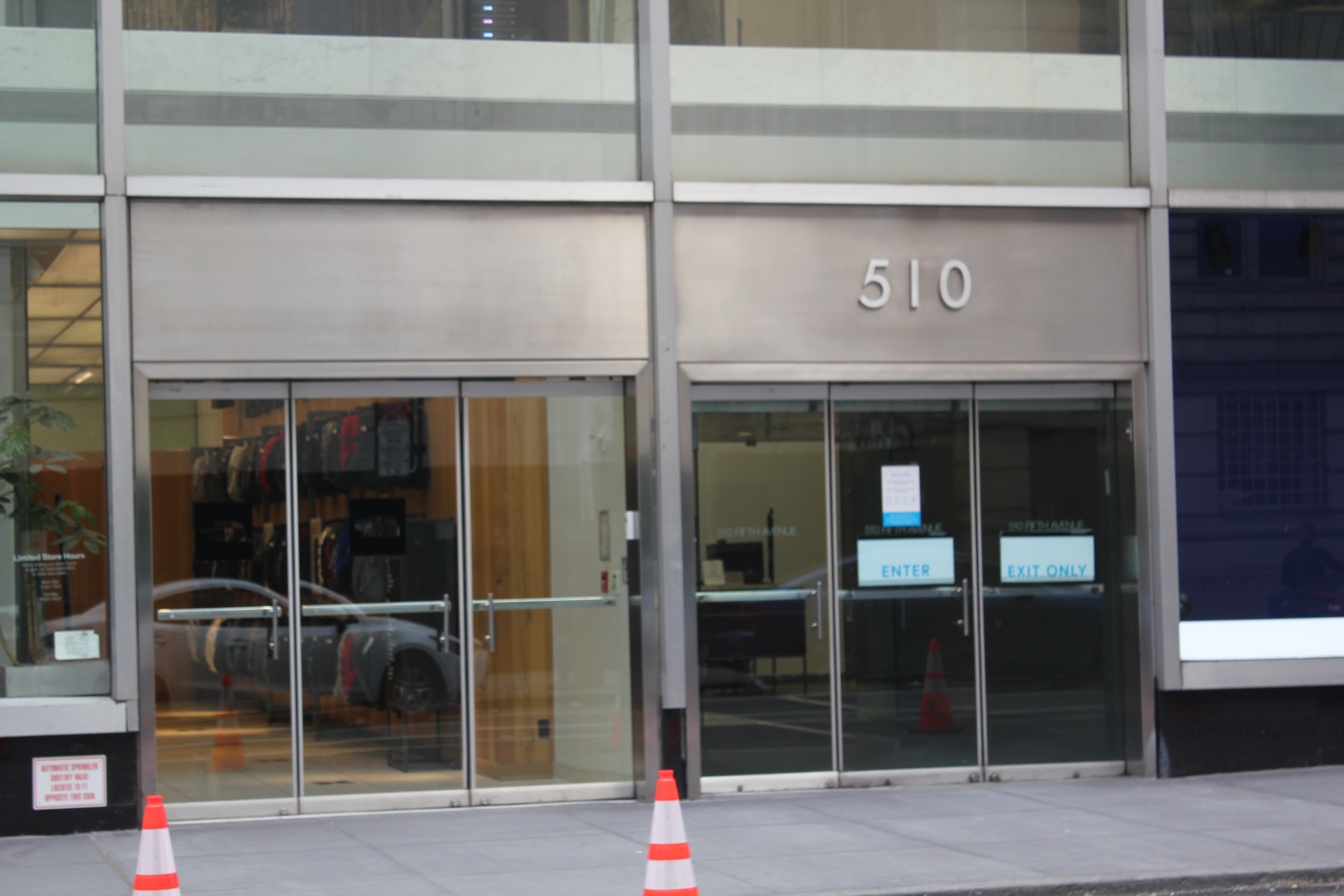
Main entrance on 43rd Street

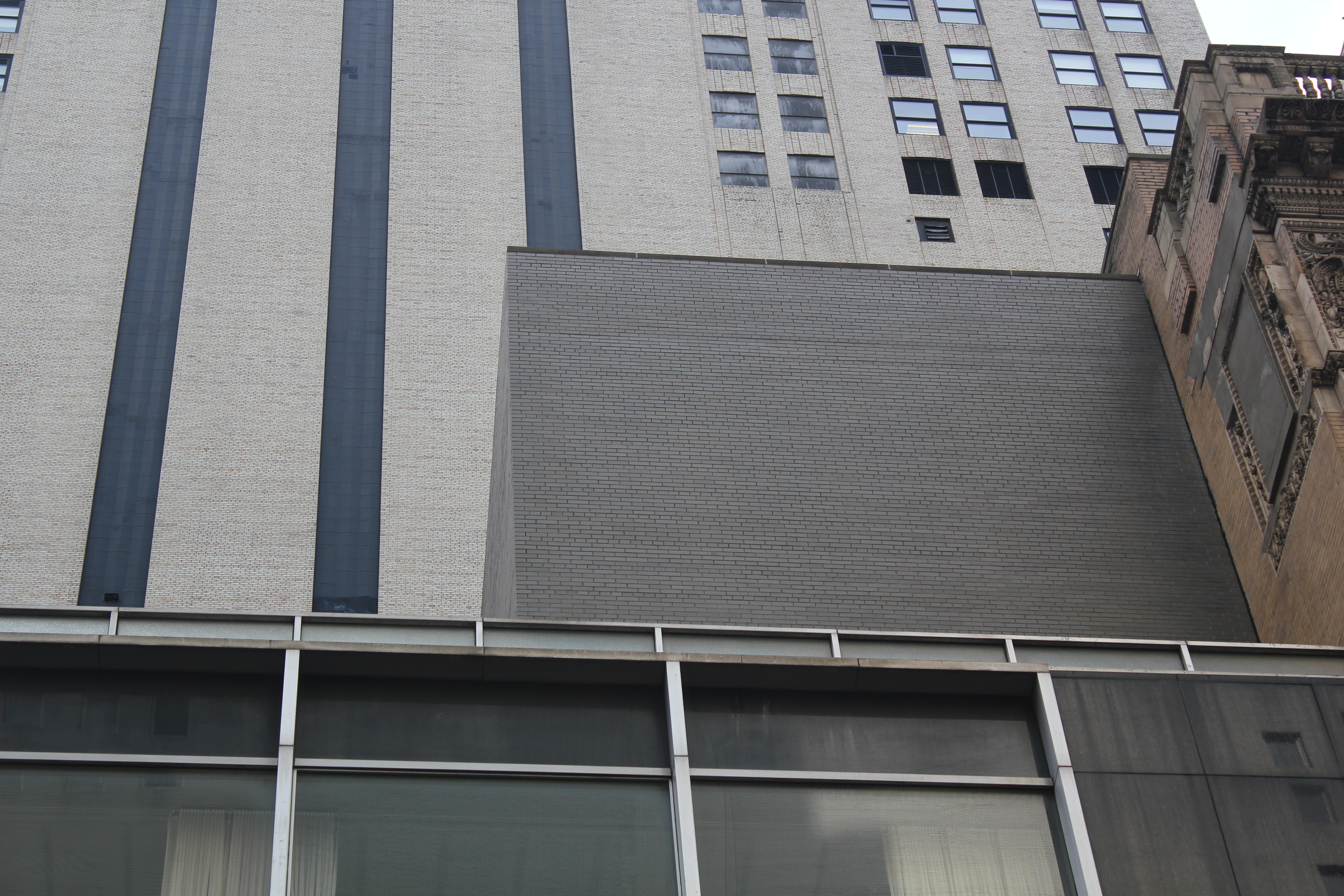
A portion of the penthouse

The Manufacturers Trust Company Building's facade is a curtain wall made largely of glass, incorporating 13,000 square feet (1,200 m^{2}) of that material. The elevations on Fifth Avenue and 43rd Street are made predominantly of glass. The second-floor panes were the largest ever constructed for a building at that time, measuring 9 8/12 by 22 feet (2.9 by 6.7 m) (Note: A slightly different measurement of 10 by 22 feet (3.0 by 6.7 m) is given in Krinsky 1988, p. 50.) and weighing 1,500 pounds (680 kg) each. The panes on the other three floors measure 9 by 9 feet (2.7 by 2.7 m) across. The glass measures 4 inches (100 mm) thick and was manufactured by the Franklin Glass Company, based in Pennsylvania. According to architecture critic Lewis Mumford, the presence of surrounding skyscrapers meant that the building did not need colored panes to absorb sunlight; as such, the walls could be more transparent. The walls were tinted with a thin gold layer to reduce glare.

The glass panels are held in place with horizontal rails and vertical mullions of aluminum, which were intended to give the building a lightweight appearance. They protrude 10 inches (250 mm) from the glass and divide the facade into bays measuring 9 feet 5.5 inches (2.9 m) wide. There are dark wire-glass spandrels above each window on the second, third, and fourth floors. The joints, connecting different parts of the frame, were not covered by moldings and were built to precise specifications. Polished black granite strips are used at the building's pedestal, the western end of the 43rd Street elevation, and the southern end of the Fifth Avenue elevation. The granite slab on 43rd Street contains inscriptions of SOM's and the Fuller Company's names. The penthouse, clad with gray brick in the west and glass in the east, sits behind a recessed aluminum-and-glass parapet.

The original design had two entrances, both on 43rd Street: the main banking entrance to the east and the office entrance to the west. The banking entrance, measuring three bays wide, had no signage because SOM architects felt that the vault's presence indicated the building's purpose. As part of a 2010s renovation, two more entrances were built on Fifth Avenue.

=== Interior ===
The Manufacturers Trust Company Building has a floor area of either 65,000 or 70,000 square feet (6,000 or 6,500 m^{2}). The western side has two elevators and two fire stairs. The first and second floors are connected by escalators and have an open plan. Since the 2010s, these stories have been reconfigured as retail space.

The interior is supported by eight columns, set back 11 feet (3.4 m) behind Fifth Avenue and 20 feet (6.1 m) behind 43rd Street. They are clad with white Vermont marble. The concrete floor slabs are cantilevered, extending outward from the columns without being supported at their edges, and are carried by steel and concrete beams. The third and fourth stories' slabs are concealed by the facade's spandrels; the second-story slab is recessed from the facade and is visible from outside. The floors have asphalt tile and cement finishes. Each story contains vinyl dropped ceilings, suspended approximately 3.5 feet (1.1 m) from the slabs above and divided into a grid with metal strips. The ceiling materials minimized the amount of light reflected off the large windows and diffuse light from cathode-ray tubes above. Utility systems are concealed above the ceiling, connecting with ducts hidden behind the south wall.

==== First floor ====
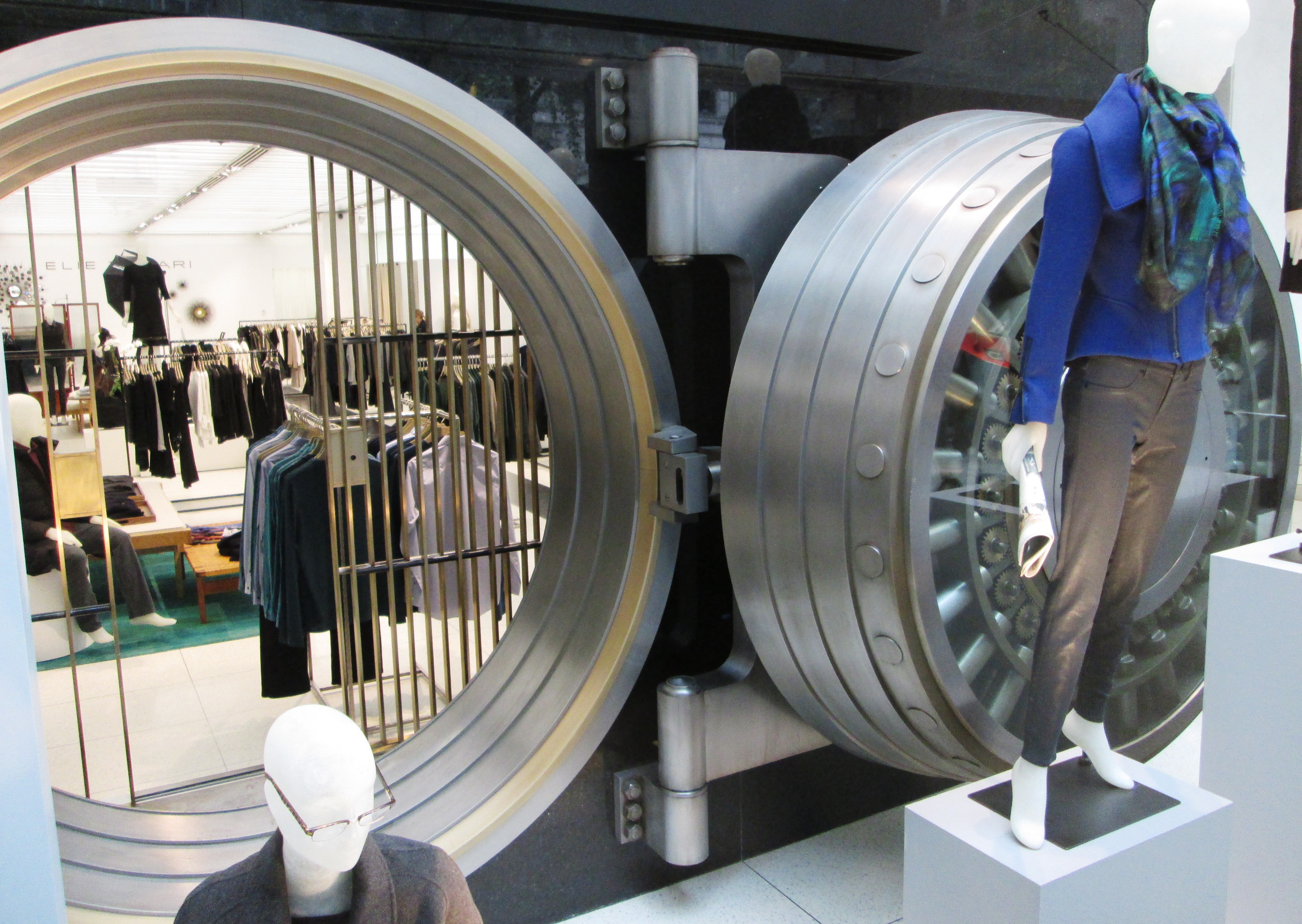
The bank vault door and vault opening later became the backdrop for a clothing display.

The first story originally contained tellers' booths, the vault, and quick-service banking facilities. The main banking space was relatively plain, with writing desks and a marble counter. A granite wall separated it from the vault to the south. To the west is an elevator lobby with steel doors, marble walls, and glass ceiling tiles.

The bank vault was placed on the first floor for convenience; the vault's walls were removed as part of the conversion to retail space, but its door remains in place. The steel door, measuring 16 inches (410 mm) thick with a diameter of 7 feet (2.1 m), was designed by Henry Dreyfuss of the Mosler Safe Company and is visible from the outside on Fifth Avenue. Although the door weighed 30 short tons (27 long tons; 27 t), Architectural Record wrote that the door could "be swung by one finger" because its bolt wheel and hinge were "so delicately balanced". Behind the door was a steel grille that was shut during the daytime. The vault itself measured 60 by 20 feet (18.3 by 6.1 m) and had 6,000 safe deposit boxes. It had separate foundations from the rest of the building.

The first and second floors were originally connected by a pair of freestanding escalators paralleling the Fifth Avenue facade. The sides of the escalators were clad in backlit aluminum panels with straw-gold finishes; by the early 1990s, these had been replaced with silver-hued panels. Bertoia created an unnamed cloud-like artwork above the escalators, suspended from wires. The original escalators were replaced in the 2010s with a new pair running perpendicularly to Fifth Avenue.

==== Other stories ====
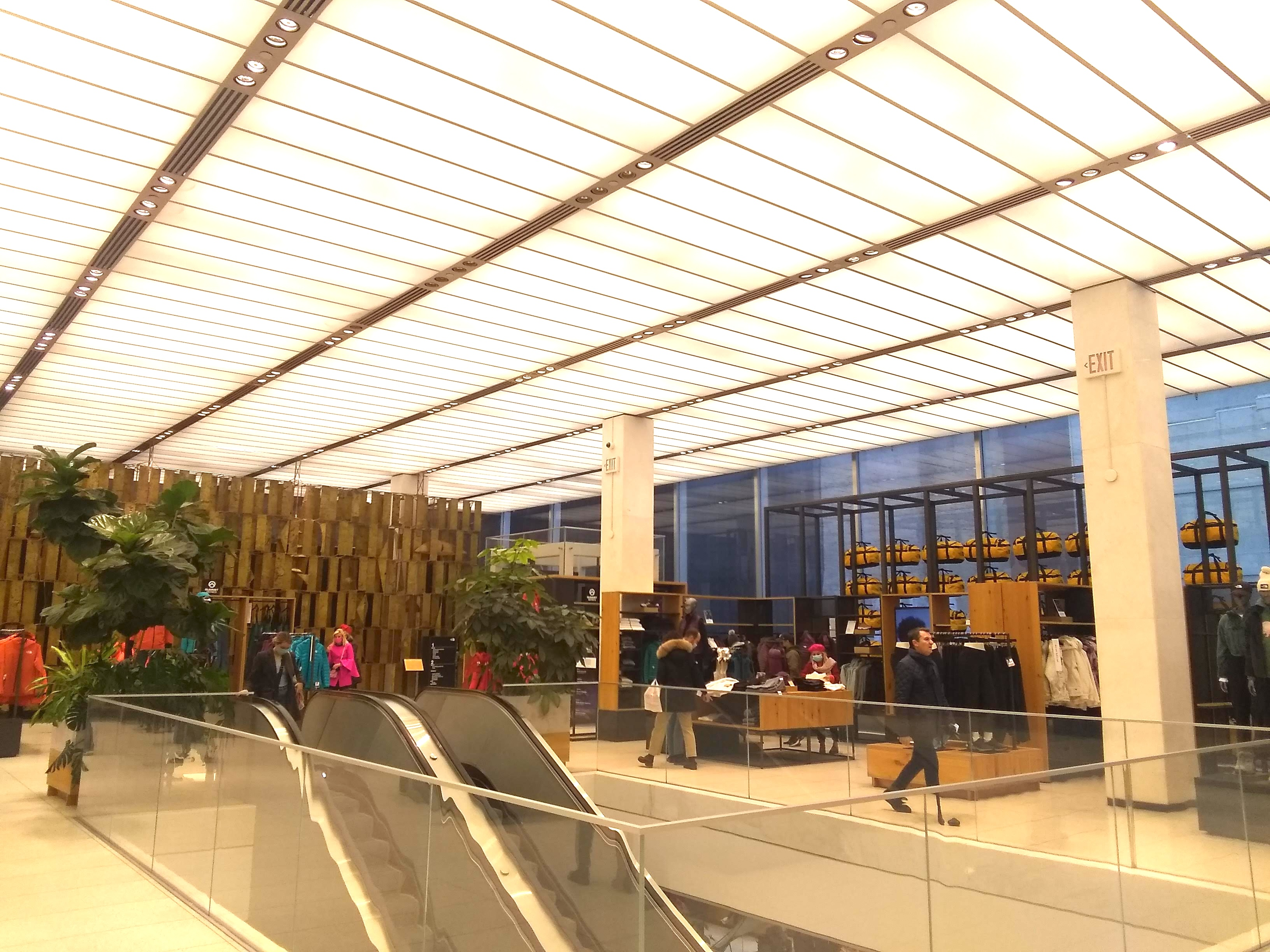
View of the second floor

The second floor, also known as the mezzanine, spans 7,000 square feet (650 m^{2}) and originally contained several bank departments and the senior officers' suites. The accounts department contained desks, each accommodating one officer. There was a banking counter made of ebony and marble, with an air duct concealed inside. There is a glass-and-aluminum divider in the gap between the floor slab and the facade. The southern wall has a large clock and was originally painted white; the western wall is made of black granite. Adjoining the western wall is a floating sculptural screen of 800 intersecting brass, copper, and nickel panels, designed by Bertoia. Known as Golden Arbor, the screen is 70 feet (21 m) long and 16 feet (4.9 m) tall, weighing 5.25 short tons (4.69 long tons; 4.76 t).

The upper three floors were offices for the bank. The third floor contained loan officers' suites and a small reception room. The penthouse was divided into two parts: The western section had mechanical equipment, stairs, and elevators; the eastern section had a reception lounge, a kitchen, managers' and presidents' offices, and a directors' room. The directors' room, which had an expandable ebony table, could be converted into a dining room. There was also a garden above the fourth floor. An employees' lounge was situated in the basement.

== History ==
By the 1940s, the Manufacturers Trust Company had 67 bank branches and was growing rapidly. The bank branch at 513 Fifth Avenue, in Midtown Manhattan, was Manufacturers Trust's second-busiest location and had been overburdened for almost a decade. Manufacturers Trust began negotiations in 1941 with the Mutual Life Insurance Company of New York, which owned both the Ziegler Building and 508 Fifth Avenue, across the street from 513 Fifth Avenue. Three years later, Manufacturers Trust leased the Ziegler Building from Mutual Life and subleased 508 Fifth Avenue from Walter Salmon.

=== Planning and construction ===
==== Walker & Gillette plans ====
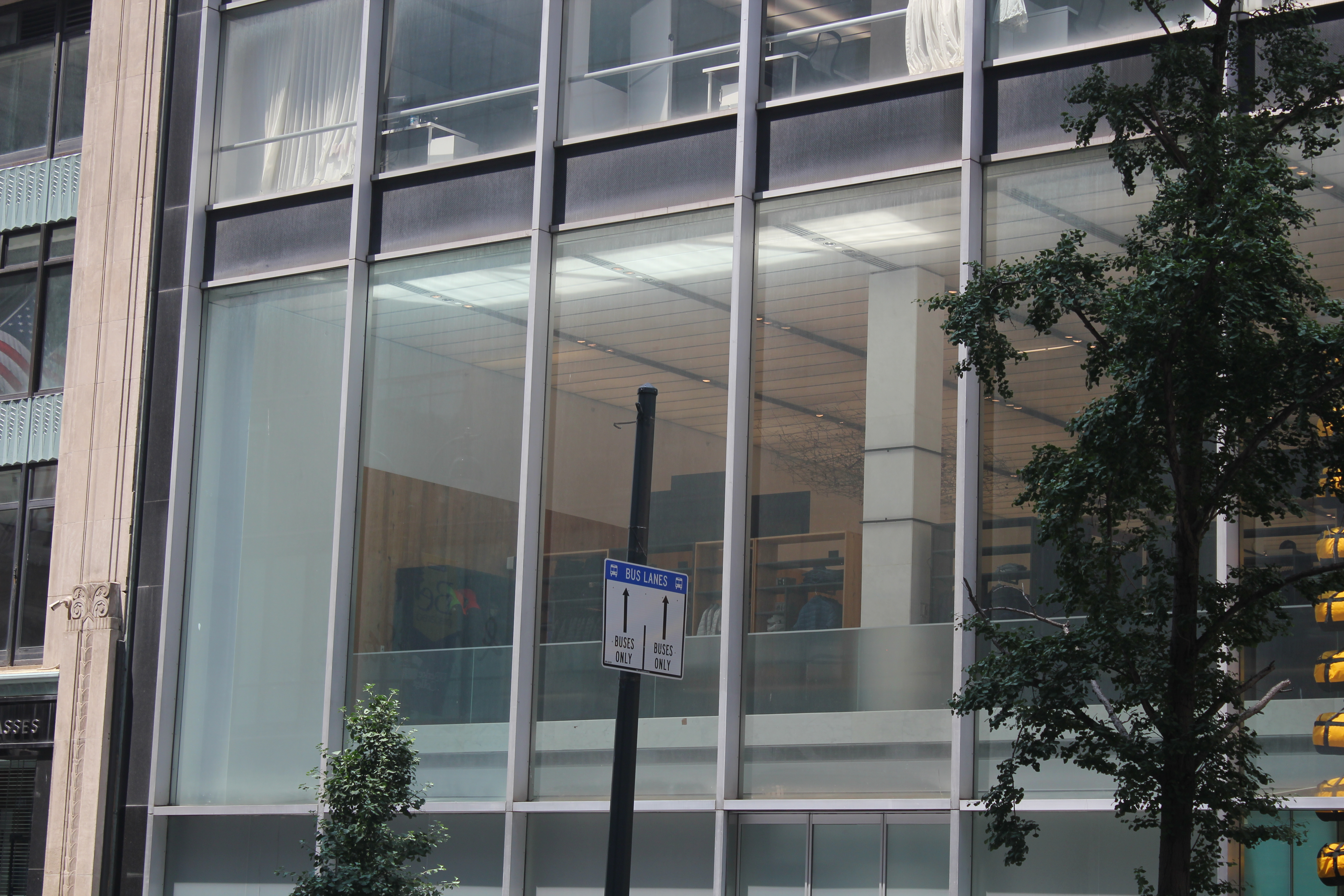
Facade detail (July 2021)

On the site it had leased, Manufacturers Trust hired the architectural firm of Walker & Gillette to design a four-story Federal Classic–style bank, replacing the 513 Fifth Avenue branch. The structure would have had a curved granite facade and would have cost either $850,000 or $1.2 million. Mutual Life had agreed to clear the land by October 1944, and the New York State Banking Department approved Manufacturers Trust's proposed relocation that December. Work was delayed due to World War II–era material shortages and a 1946 injunction blocking the eviction of the Ziegler Building's tenants. Walker & Gillette's plan was ultimately canceled in 1948 because of difficulties in evicting tenants and clearing the land.

Walker & Gillette's successor firm, Walker & Poor, was hired in July 1950 to modify the original proposal. Early the next year, Mutual Life evicted the tenants of 508 Fifth Avenue and the Ziegler Building, giving the structures to Manufacturers Trust. Material restrictions during the Korean War delayed the project again. To prevent the Ziegler Building from becoming an unused "white elephant", Manufacturers Trust rented its space to federal agencies. The Department of Commerce, Bureau of Internal Revenue, and the Small Defense Plants Administration leased a combined 62,000 square feet (5,800 m^{2}). After the wartime restrictions were lifted, Manufacturers Trust told these agencies in July 1952 that the building would be razed. By then, Walker & Poor was no longer involved with designing the new building.

==== SOM involvement ====
There are two possible explanations for how SOM became involved with the project. According to architectural historian Carol Herselle Krinsky, one of the bank's trustees, Lou Crandall, worked for the company that had hired SOM to design Lever House. Alternatively, the commission may have come through SOM cofounder Louis Skidmore, who was on the board of directors for another Manufacturers Trust branch, and who was friends with Flanigan. SOM was initially invited to suggest improvements to Walker & Poor's plans, but Bunshaft preferred to redesign the building completely. In 1953, Manufacturers Trust modified its agreement with Mutual Life to accept responsibility for the construction costs. Under the agreement, 25,000 to 70,000 square feet (2,300 to 6,500 m^{2}) could be built above ground, but the site at 508 Fifth Avenue was still subject to a height restriction. Although a larger structure was theoretically possible, this would have required constructing loading docks and more elevators, which Manufacturers Trust deemed undesirable.

Manufacturers Trust sought a design with an "inviting look" that could accommodate high traffic, while also being readily adaptable for other uses if the bank were shuttered. SOM's junior architects participated in an informal competition to design the building. Charles Evans Hughes III submitted the winning design, which featured glass walls and a bank vault visible from outside. Bunshaft was then tasked with revising Hughes's proposal. Building plans were submitted to the city government in April 1953, and excavations were completed that November. The George A. Fuller Company erected the structure, with Alan Labie as the job captain. Weiskopf and Pickworth were the structural engineers, Syska and Hennessy were the mechanical and electrical engineers, and Clarke and Rapuano were the landscape architects. The glass facade was being installed by July 1954.

=== Bank use ===
==== 1950s to 1990s ====
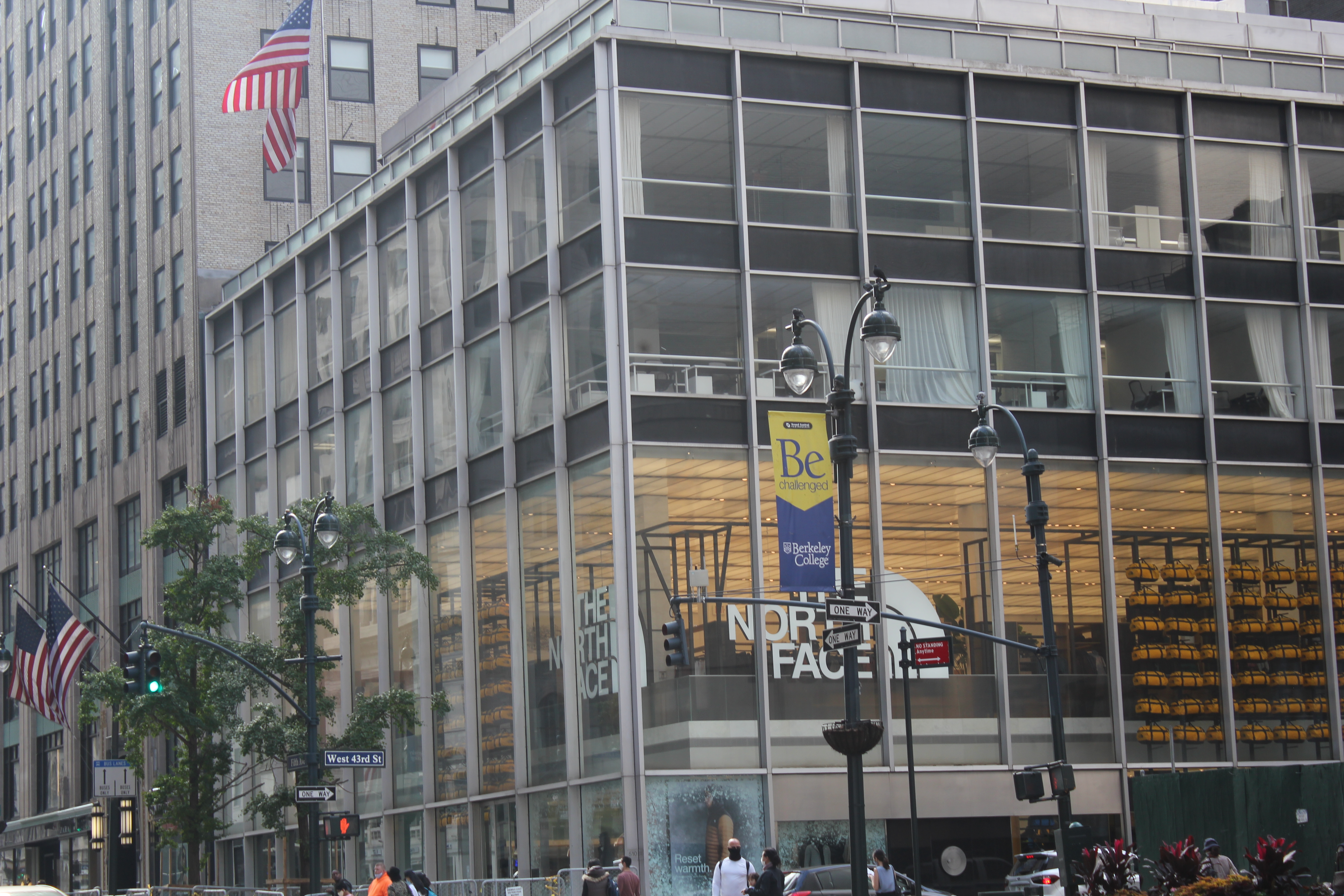
Seen from slightly further north along Fifth Avenue (October 2020)

Manufacturers Trust invited the media to preview the new branch on September 22, 1954, and moved $76 million in deposits (equivalent to $702.24 million in 2024) to the new building on October 2. The bank building officially opened on October 5 and, on its first day, received 15,000 visitors. Manufacturers Trust distributed 1,100 pictures of the building to 146 media outlets. The media praised several aspects of the design, such as the glass facade and the vault's visibility from the street, and the building also received much notice from the general public.

Manufacturers Trust's deposits tripled within nine months of the branch's opening. During the building's first year, it set a record for the most new accounts opened at a Manufacturers Trust branch in a single year; the bank overall saw a 31 percent increase in account holders and a 200 percent increase in profits. Excluding bank clients, the building had accommodated 100,000 visitors by 1960, with an average of 400 per month. The next year, Manufacturers Trust merged with Central Hanover Bank & Trust to form the Manufacturers Hanover Corporation. Following the merger, the building remained one of Manufacturers Hanover's busiest branches. The front portion of the vault was emptied by the late 1970s, while the rear portion remained in use. Gold-tinted curtains measuring 33 feet (10 m) tall were mounted on the lower stories but had been removed by 1989.

Manufacturers Hanover merged with Chemical Bank in 1991, and Chemical Bank gained ownership of the underlying land from Mutual Life the following February. A partition made of aluminum and glass was installed between the first and second floors in 1993. Other modifications were also undertaken around this time, including the addition of partition walls around the escalators and a parapet on the second floor. Chemical Bank was merged into Chase Bank in 1996, upon which the building was undergoing extensive interior alterations. The next year, the New York City Landmarks Preservation Commission (LPC) granted landmark protection to the building's exterior.

==== 2000s and early 2010s ====
By 2000, Chase intended to sell the Manufacturers Trust Company Building. At the time, the fashion designer Elie Tahari and his eponymous firm had a design studio and sample room there. Chase sued Tahari, alleging that his office was a fire hazard, as Tahari had allegedly refused to install sprinklers. A garment workers' union sided with Tahari, claiming that the bank was trying to break his lease to increase the building's sale price. Tahari was ultimately allowed to stay, and in 2001, Chase sold the edifice to Tahl-Propp Equities for $24 million. Chase retained ownership of 150,000 square feet (14,000 m^{2}) in air rights for potential development, and continued to own the Bertoia sculptures; the Chase branch on the first floor also remained in operation. Tahl-Propp Equities also made Tahari a limited partner in the building's ownership.

Vornado Realty Trust bought the building in October 2010 for $57 million, and Chase closed its branch shortly afterward, having declined to extend its lease. The Bertoia artwork on the second floor was disassembled because Chase's lease required the company to take the artwork with them. The artwork's removal prompted preservationists to advocate for protecting the building's interiors, an effort that the Historic Districts Council and Vornado supported. The LPC designated the first and second floors as interior landmarks in February 2011.

=== Retail use ===
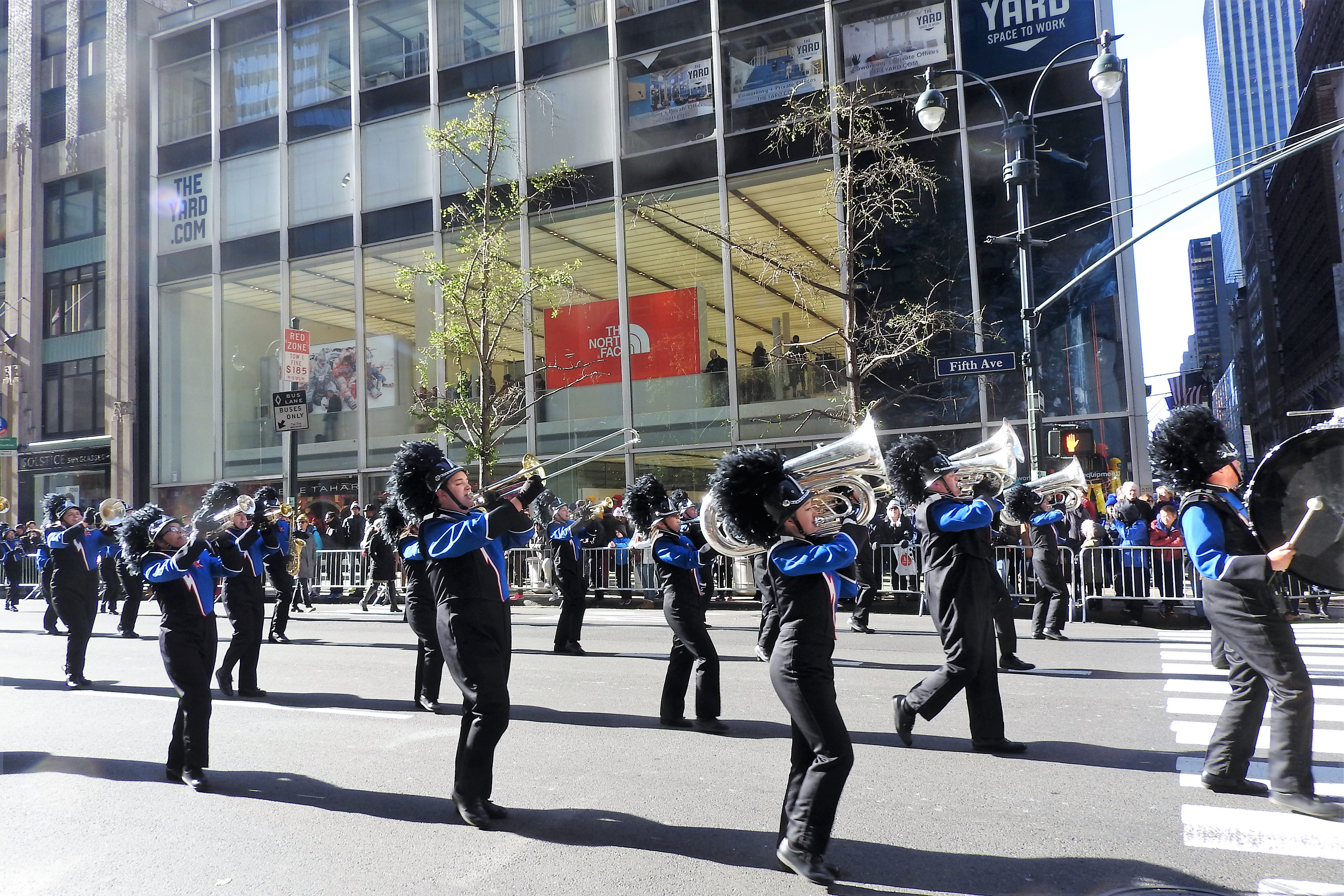
The facade in November 2017 during a parade

==== Preservation disputes and renovation ====
The Joe Fresh retail chain signed a lease for part of the space in January 2011, and the LPC gave Vornado permission to modify the building's interior layout three months later. The project was to create two new retail spaces on Fifth Avenue by cutting new doorways into the facade, rotating the escalators, and reducing the vault wall. Vornado hired SOM to redesign the building, whose tenants at the time included Bloomberg L.P., the company of New York City mayor Michael Bloomberg.

Preservationists sued to stop the changes, and a New York Supreme Court judge issued a temporary order blocking the renovation in July 2011, which was subsequently converted into an injunction. The preservationists claimed that the architecture was being damaged, suggesting that the changes were part of a pattern of city government unduly favoring developers, while the building's owner claimed that the changes respected the original design. The architecture critic Ada Louise Huxtable of The Wall Street Journal called the project a "travesty" and "conversion to generic commercial space", particularly deriding the removal of the Bertoia screen from the site. The World Monuments Fund added the structure to its 2012 "watch list" of endangered buildings.

The organization Docomomo and a coalition of preservation organizations sued Vornado for allegedly removing historical design details, and they reached a settlement in February 2012. As part of the settlement agreement, Bertoia's artwork was reinstalled, and Chase agreed to lend the works indefinitely for public display. The interior was restored to resemble its original design, with glass interior partitions. Contractors relocated the escalators, reinforced the second floor, removed the former vault's walls, and added steel framing and reinforced polymer fabric. The facade and interior columns were also restored, and the luminous ceiling was replaced with a replica. The renovation, which adaptively reused the bank building as a commercial property, was completed by the end of 2012.

==== Subsequent tenancy ====
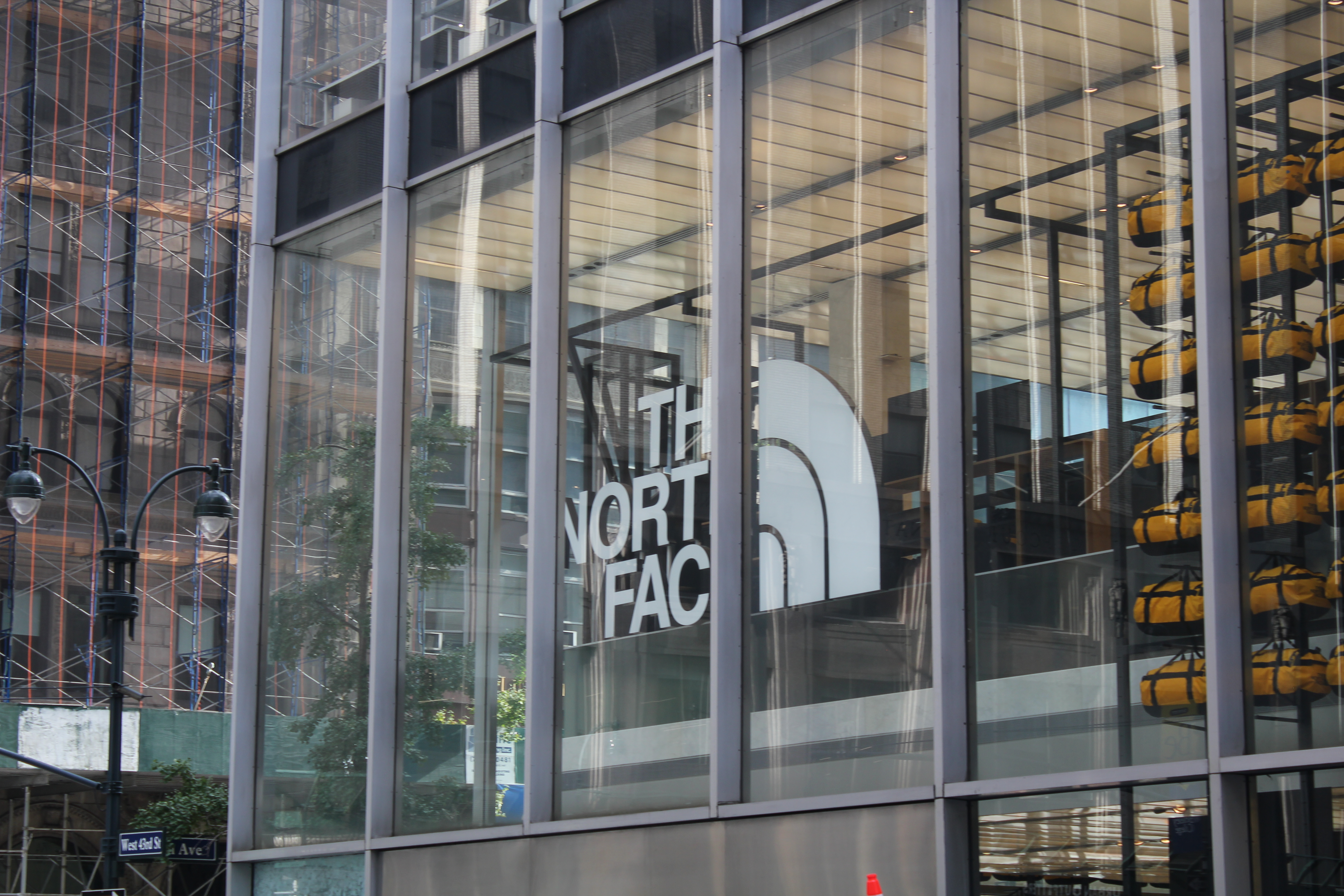
The North Face store as seen in 2020

Joe Fresh opened a 14,000-square-foot (1,300 m^{2}) store on the ground and second floors in 2012. The next year, Tahari opened a pop-up store on the ground floor and leased space in the penthouse. The Joe Fresh store closed in March 2016. The clothing retailer The North Face opened its flagship store there that October, subleasing Joe Fresh's space and occupying 20,000 square feet (1,900 m^{2}) on the basement, first, and second stories. The coworking company The Yard leased the entire third floor in 2017. After Vornado proposed installing a glass wall around the escalators the net year, one preservationist expressed concerns that it would damage the original design.

Amid the COVID-19 pandemic in New York City, Tahari broke his lease in July 2020, prompting Vornado to sue for $14.8 million in future rent payments. The Reuben Brothers paid $50 million for the building in August 2023 as part of a $124 million purchase of four Vornado properties. The next year, the retail brand GU leased 24,330 square feet (2,260 m^{2}), with plans to open a store there. GU wished to relocate Bertoia's cloud artwork, demolish some dressing rooms, and replace lighting. The North Face store had closed by 2025, after the lease expired. The clothing brand Uniqlo subsequently announced plans in late 2025 for a Bryant Park flagship store, which opened at 510 Fifth Avenue in March 2026.

== Impact ==
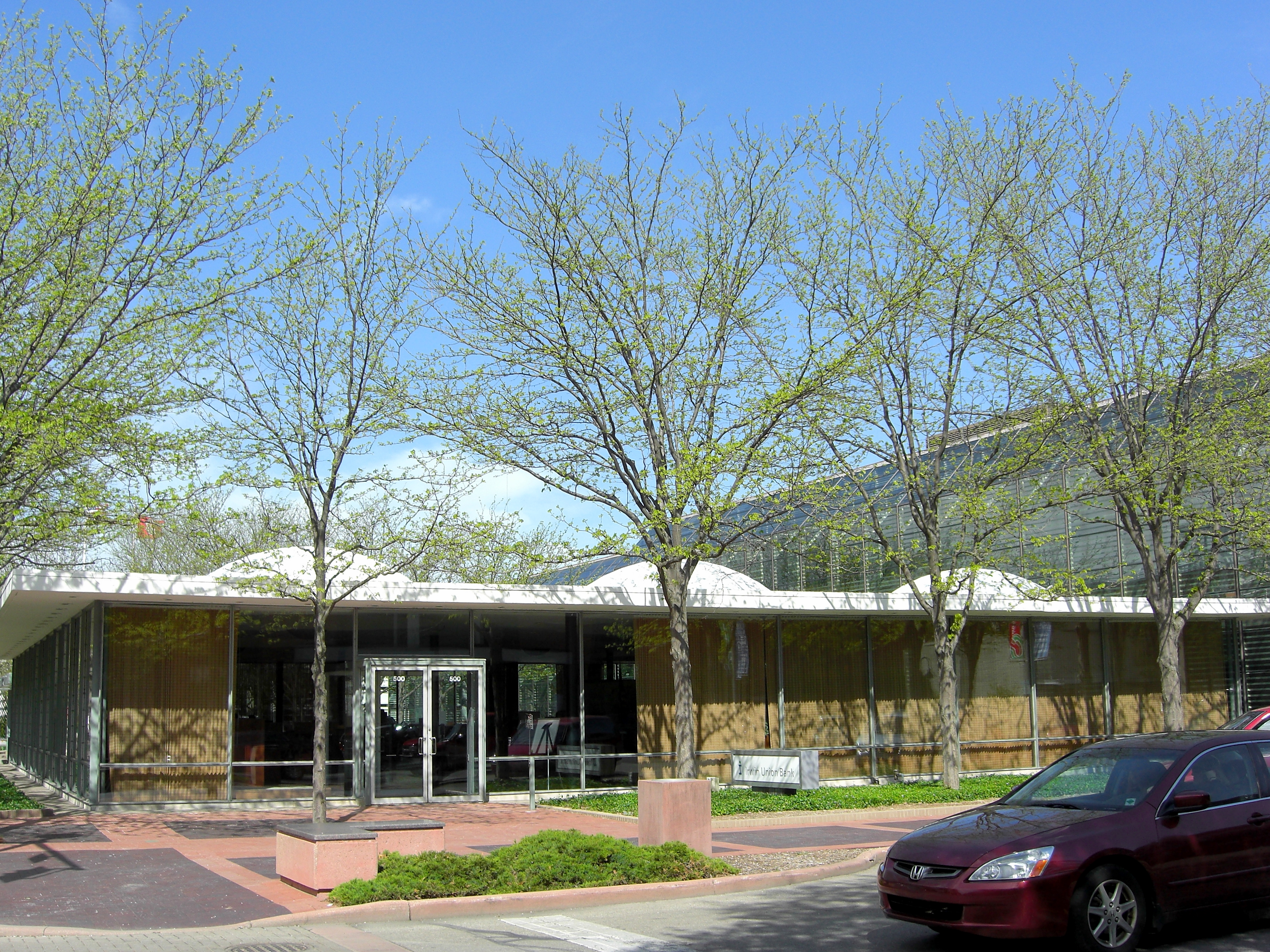
The Manufacturers Trust Building has been likened to Eero Saarinen's Irwin Union Bank and Trust building (pictured), which also had a glass facade and open plan.

With the success of the Fifth Avenue branch, Manufacturers Trust retrofitted its other branches with similarly modern designs. By the 1960s, many banks across the United States were being built in the International Style; in New York City, these included the Emigrant Bank's nearby 42nd Street branch and Chase Bank's banking concourse at 28 Liberty Street. Though the architects said that the vault door's visibility from Fifth Avenue was a purely aesthetic choice, its presence deterred thefts, and subsequent banks started using visible vault doors. The building was likened to Eero Saarinen's Irwin Union Bank and Trust building in Columbus, Indiana, which also had a glass facade and open plan.

=== Reception ===
During the building's construction, its cantilevered floors, light-filled spaces, and glass-and-metal facade drew attention from engineers and architects. Lewis Mumford compared it to a lantern, and the building's construction superintendent described the lightweight design as being jewel-like. Interiors magazine praised the internal design in 1955 as pure and straightforward. The New York Daily News said that the design allowed people to learn "how actual banking is transacted" merely by standing on the sidewalk. Other commentators offered qualified praise, particularly regarding the glass walls and the thin piers. Huxtable criticized the original illumination as being too yellow, and Harper's Magazine assailed the building as uneconomical due to their unused air rights.

The World Monuments Fund called the building's glass design a "metaphor for honesty and transparency in banking" and a "symbol of a self-confident era" which influenced commercial architecture. The 2010 edition of the AIA Guide to New York City called it "a glass-sheathed supermarket of dollars" and stated that the building "led the banking profession out of the cellar and onto the street". The next year, Robin Pogrebin of The New York Times described the Manufacturers Trust Company Building as a paragon of modern architecture, with a similar level of architectural prominence to the nearby Lever House and Seagram Building.

The Bertoia piece attracted mixed feedback. One review characterized it as "breath-taking"; other observers likened it to a flying bedspring and broken egg crates. The journalist David W. Dunlap characterized Bertoia's work as a "midcentury masterwork", likening it to a Jackson Pollock painting.

=== Landmark designations ===
When the New York City Landmarks Preservation Commission (LPC) first considered granting landmark status to the Manufacturers Trust Company Building in 1979, the structure was too new to qualify for that designation. The agency held hearings on designating the building's exterior in 1985 and 1986, but Manufacturers Hanover and Mutual Life opposed landmark status at the time. Three more hearings were held in 1989 and 1990. By then, the closure or downsizing of several bank buildings in New York City had prompted renewed interest in their preservation.

The LPC designated the building's exterior, along with the Ford Foundation Building and the CBS Building, as city landmarks on October 21, 1997. A separate landmark designation was granted to a portion of the interior on February 15, 2011, covering the banking spaces on the first and second floors. LPC chairman Robert B. Tierney cited the ceilings, floor plans, and minimalist design as reasons for the landmark designation.

=== Awards ===
The design received the Architectural League of New York's Gold Medal for Architecture and the Municipal Art Society's Plaque of Commendation in 1955. A local group, the Fifth Avenue Association, gave the building an Award for Excellence the next year. The renovation received a 2013 American Institute of Architects New York City Chapter Design Award and a 2013 Architectural Record "Good Design Is Good Business" award.

== See also ==
- Architecture of New York City
- List of New York City Designated Landmarks in Manhattan from 14th to 59th Streets
