= John E. Toews =

American historian

John Edward Toews (born 1944) is a Canadian-born historian of modern Western intellectual and cultural history. He is Professor Emeritus of History at the University of Washington, where he is known for his role in developing the Comparative History of Ideas (CHID) program into a nationally recognized model for interdisciplinary education.

Toews’s research focuses on nineteenth- and twentieth-century European thought, especially the evolution of historical consciousness and the ethical implications of historicism in modern culture.

== Early life and education ==
Toews was born into a Mennonite family in Coaldale, Alberta, and raised in Winnipeg, Manitoba. He completed his undergraduate degree at the University of Manitoba and graduated from Harvard University with a Ph.D. under the direction of H. Stuart Hughes in 1973.

== Career ==
John Toews joined the University of Washington in the late 1970s, where he became a central figure in advancing interdisciplinary education. He chaired the Comparative History of Ideas (CHID) Program from 1982 to 2010, transforming it into one of the leading undergraduate interdisciplinary majors in the United States.

Toews retired from active teaching at the end of the 2016 winter quarter and was honored by colleagues and students for his long service; he is listed as Professor Emeritus in the UW History Department.

In recognition of his scholarship and intellectual contributions, Toews received a MacArthur Fellowship in 1984.

== Research and scholarly works ==
Toews’s research focuses on modern European intellectual and cultural history, particularly the development of historical consciousness in nineteenth-century German thought. His book, Hegelianism: The Path Toward Dialectical Humanism (Cambridge University Press, 1981), reconstructs the historical contexts and intellectual trajectories of thinkers in the Kantian and Hegelian traditions, including Kierkegaard, Marx, and Nietzsche.

His later work, Becoming Historical: Cultural Reformation and Public Memory in Early Nineteenth-Century Berlin (Cambridge University Press, 2004), explores how early nineteenth-century ruptures with tradition generated new modes of personal and collective identity. The book analyzes the works of prominent Prussian artists and intellectuals who engaged with reformist movements under the Prussian regime of the 1840s, tracing the emergence of modern historical consciousness through the interplay of culture, politics, and memory.

== Awards ==
- 1984 MacArthur Fellows Program
- 2004-2005 Hans Rosenberg Prize of the American Historical Association for the best book in German and Central European History

== Works ==
- Becoming Historical: Cultural Reformation and Public Memory in Early Nineteenth-Century Berlin (Cambridge University Press, 2004).
- "Refashioning the Masculine Subject in Early Modernism", in Mark Micale, ed. The Mind of Modernism: Medicine, Psychology and the Cultural Arts in Europe and America 1880-1940, Stanford University Press, 2003.
- "The Linguistic Turn and Discourse Analysis in History," International Encyclopedia of the Social Sciences, Elsevier Press, 2001, XIII, 8916-1932.
- The Communist Manifesto by Karl Marx and Frederick Engels, edited, Bedford/St. Martin's, 1999.
- "Having and Being: The Evolution of Freud's Oedipus Theory as a Moral Fable", in Michael Roth ed., Sigmund Freud: Conflict and Culture, Alfred Knopf, 1998. ISBN 9780679451167
- Hegelianism: The Path Toward Dialectical Humanism, 1805-1841, Cambridge University Press, 1981. ISBN 9780521230483
- "A New Philosophy of History? Reflections on Postmodern Historicizing".(JSTOR) History and Theory, 1997. 36 (2):235–248 OCLC 477460681

== See also ==
- History of ideas
- Intellectual history
