= George Davidson (attorney) =

American lawyer

- Born: George Allan Davidson; April 6, 1942 (age 84); New York
- Education: Brown University; Columbia University School of Law
- Occupations: Attorney, lawyer

George Allan Davidson (born April 6, 1942) is an attorney and the former head of the Litigation Department of the New York law firm Hughes Hubbard & Reed, having taken the position of Counsel upon retirement. He currently serves as an arbitrator in domestic and international cases.

Davidson is the former president of the Legal Aid Society, a position he held from 1987 to 1989. Davidson was also a director of the Legal Aid Society from 1978 to 1992 and a member of its President's Council from 1990 to 2006.

A respected litigator, Davidson has been involved in many landmark cases, including his 2000 victory before the Supreme Court in Boy Scouts of America v. Dale, where Davidson represented the Boy Scouts of America.

Davidson graduated from Brown University in 1964 and graduated magna cum laude from Columbia University School of Law in 1967.

After graduating from law school, from 1967 to 1968, Davidson served as a law clerk to the Hon. Paul R. Hays of the United States Court of Appeals for the Second Circuit.

Davidson is a fellow of the American College of Trial Lawyers, a Life Member of the American Law Institute, and a Trustee of the William Nelson Cromwell Foundation. He served as chair of the Federal Defenders of New York and chair of the Board of Directors of the New York City-based non-profit organization Greenwich House, Inc.
