= List of high commissioners of Grenada to the United Kingdom =

High Commissioner for Grenada to the Court of St. James’s
- Incumbent; Rachér Croney since 2023
- Style: Her Excellency
- Residence: West Kensington in London
- Inaugural holder: H.E. Mr. Oswald Moxley Gibbs; First High Commissioner to the United Kingdom
- Formation: 14 November 1974; High Commissioners
- Website: High Commission for Grenada to the United Kingdom

The High Commissioner of Grenada to the United Kingdom is Grenada's foremost diplomatic representative in the United Kingdom of Great Britain and Northern Ireland.

Countries belonging to the Commonwealth of Nations typically exchange High Commissioners, rather than Ambassadors. Though there are a few technical differences (for instance, whereas Ambassadors present their diplomatic credentials to the host country's head of state, High Commissioners are accredited to the head of government), they are in practice one and the same office. The following persons have served as Grenadian High Commissioner to the United Kingdom.

== List of heads of mission ==
=== High Commissioners to the United Kingdom ===
- Oswald Moxley Gibbs, 1974–1978
- Raymond Anthony, 1979
- Fennis Augustine, 1979–1983
- Oswald Moxley Gibbs, 1984–1990
- Lynton Noel, 1990–1992
- Maureen Emmanuel, 1992–1995
- June Lendore, 1995–1996
- Marcelle Gairy, 1997–1998
- Ruth Elizabeth Rouse, 1999–2004
- Joslyn Whiteman, 2004–2005
- Joseph S Charter, 2005–2008
- Ruth Elizabeth Rouse, 2008–2013
- Joslyn Whiteman, 2013–2016
- Karl Hood, 2016–2018
- Kisha Alexander-Grant, 2018–2023
- Rachér Croney, 2023–Present
