= Keisha A. McGuire =

Chair Of the United Nations special committee on Decolonization

Keisha Amiya McGuire (born 1982) is an attorney and since April 2016 to June 2022, the Grenadian Permanent Representative to the United Nations.

In 2020, she was re-elected to chair the Special Committee on Decolonisation.

Immediately prior to her appointment, McGuire was an associate at Hughes Hubbard & Reed in the litigation department (2012 to 2016). She also practiced with Hogan Lovells US LLP.

McGuire earned a Doctor of Laws degree from Cornell University, a bachelor’s degree from the University of Miami, and an associate degree from Barbados Community College.
