= Montana Land Reliance =

American nonprofit land trust

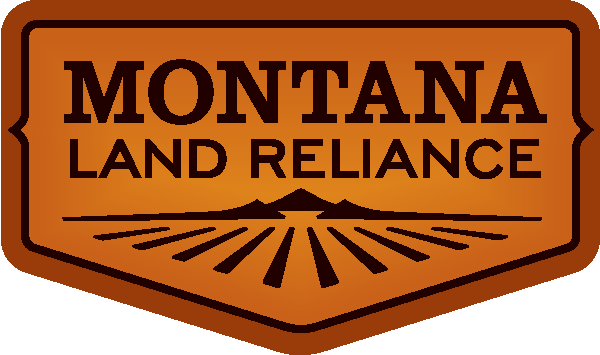
MLR logo

The Montana Land Reliance (MLR) is a nonprofit land trust established to acquire and manage conservation easements in the State of Montana. Headquartered in Helena, Montana, the organization holds 897 easements on 1,137,062 acres of private property across the state. It is the largest land trust in the State of Montana, the largest state-based land trust in the United States, and is accredited by the Land Trust Alliance.

== Mission and History ==
The Montana Land Reliance was founded in 1978. Its mission is to partner "with private landowners to permanently protect agricultural lands, fish and wildlife habitat, and open space." In 1981, when the organization penned its original mission, the Board and organization's leaders determined that “The immediate accomplishments of MLR's conservation work are measured in miles of streambanks and acres of land and habitat protected. The lasting benefits of MLR's work are the perpetuation of a lifestyle and an economy that rely on responsibly managed private land and increasingly valuable Montana open spaces that will continue to nourish the spirit of future generations." Although MLR has traditionally worked with agricultural producers to protect the environmental and economic integrity of Montana in the face of increased development, it has more recently found conservation allies in recreational landowners. Each of the organization's easements contributes to the preservation of wildlife habitat and ecosystems, open space, and the economic and recreational land uses unique to the State of Montana.

== Conservation Easements ==
A conservation easement is a voluntary legal agreement between a landowner and a land trust that limits the uses of the land in order to protect its conservation values. The landowner – the conservation easement donor – retains title to the property. Regardless of changes in ownership, however, the conservation easement runs with the title, thereby protecting the land in perpetuity, for example from inappropriate development.

Total acreage under easement: 1,137,062 acres (460,153 ha)

Total acreage by resource

- Range/Forests: 950,018
- Elk habitat: 584,423
- Wetlands: 68,955

Miles of stream frontage protected: 1,829

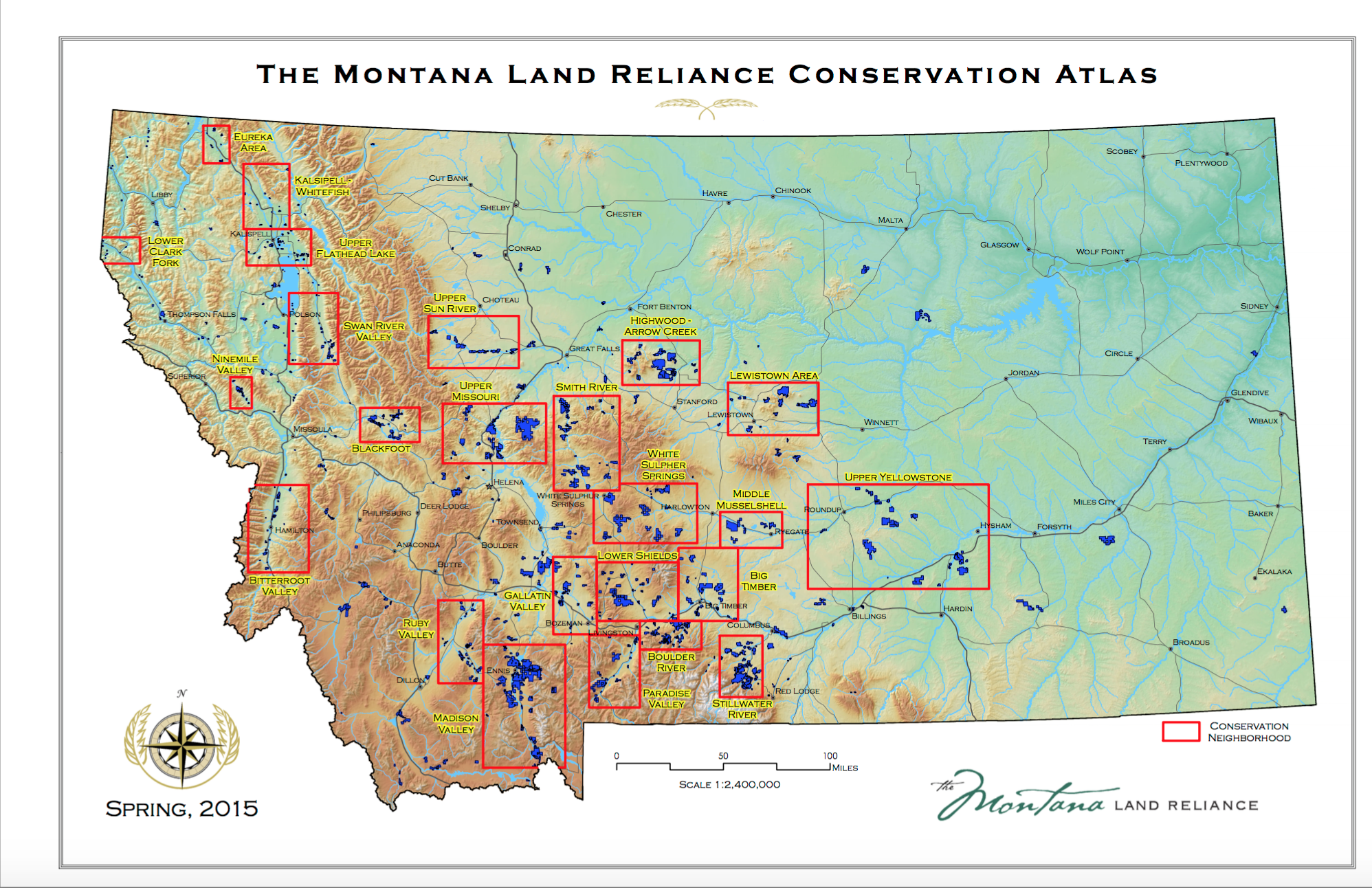
MLR Easements to date

== Ecosystem Services ==
Ecosystem services are the products of nature that benefit people, and include services such as water and air filtration. Each ecosystem service is quantifiable, which enables one to determine a return on investment in conservation in the value of what an acre of conserved land gives back to people on an annual basis. The Montana Land Reliance has found that its protected acres return over $300,000,000 annually in ecosystem services.

== Ruby Habitat Foundation ==
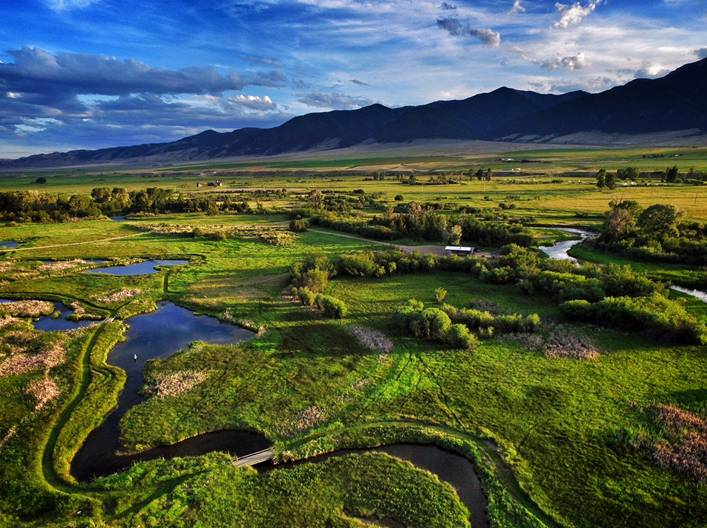
Over RHF's Woodson Ranch

Ruby Habitat Foundation is a 509(a)(3) support organization for The Montana Land Reliance, founded in 2002. The Foundation manages a 1,100-acre ranch in Sheridan, Montana, through which runs 4 miles of the Ruby River, a man made spring creek, and Clear Creek, a braid of the Ruby River. In addition to managing a fishing and hunting program for visitors from around the country, it is an experimental property on which the Foundation conducts experiments to establish agricultural and recreational best practices.
