= Candace Beinecke =

American lawyer

Candace Beinecke is Senior Partner of Hughes Hubbard & Reed, where in 1999 she became the first female head of a major New York law firm. In November 2020 she was named Co-Chair of the Board of the Metropolitan Museum of Art with Hamilton James, effective January 12, 2021, the first time the museum had two chairs and the first time its Chair was a woman. She has also served as the Board Chair of the Wallace Foundation since 2017.

Beinecke grew up in Paterson, New Jersey, the daughter of a radio host Tippie Taylor, and graduated from Rutgers Law School in 1970. She is married to Frederick Beinecke.

== Career ==
Beinecke holds a bachelor's degree from New York University and a J.D. from Rutgers University School of Law. She joined Hughes Hubbard & Reed in 1970, became a partner in 1979, and served as the firm's chair from 1999 until 2017; her election made her the first woman to lead a major New York City law firm. Her practice focuses on corporate governance, sensitive matters and internal investigations, and she has been listed among Lawdragon's leading dealmakers.

== Metropolitan Museum of Art ==
Beinecke was elected a trustee of the Metropolitan Museum of Art in 2010 and has chaired the board's legal committee since 2011. She co-chaired the search committee that recommended Max Hollein as the museum's director. On 10 November 2020 the Met announced her election, with Hamilton "Tony" James, as co-chair of its board of trustees, effective 12 January 2021, succeeding Daniel Brodsky, who had served as chairman for more than nine years; his term, due to end in September 2020, had been extended because of the COVID-19 pandemic. The board also voted to lengthen the chair's term from three years to five.

== Boards ==
Beinecke has served on the boards of ViacomCBS and Vornado Realty Trust, where she is lead independent trustee, and is chair of First Eagle Funds.She has also been vice chair and later a director of the Partnership for New York City, chair of the Wallace Foundation, and a board member and later trustee emerita of Jacob's Pillow.
