= Ruth Elizabeth Rouse =

Grenadian diplomat (born 1963)

Ruth Elizabeth Rouse (born January 30, 1963, Parish of St. David, Grenada) is a diplomat who served as the Grenadian Permanent Representative to the United Nations, High Commissioner to the UK, and Non-Resident High Commissioner to the Republic of South Africa. In January 2020, she was named Secretary to the Grenada Cabinet.

She earned an MA in diplomatic studies from the University of Westminster in the United Kingdom and a BA in French and Spanish from Carleton University in Canada.
