= Charles Evans Hughes Jr. =

American lawyer (1889–1950)

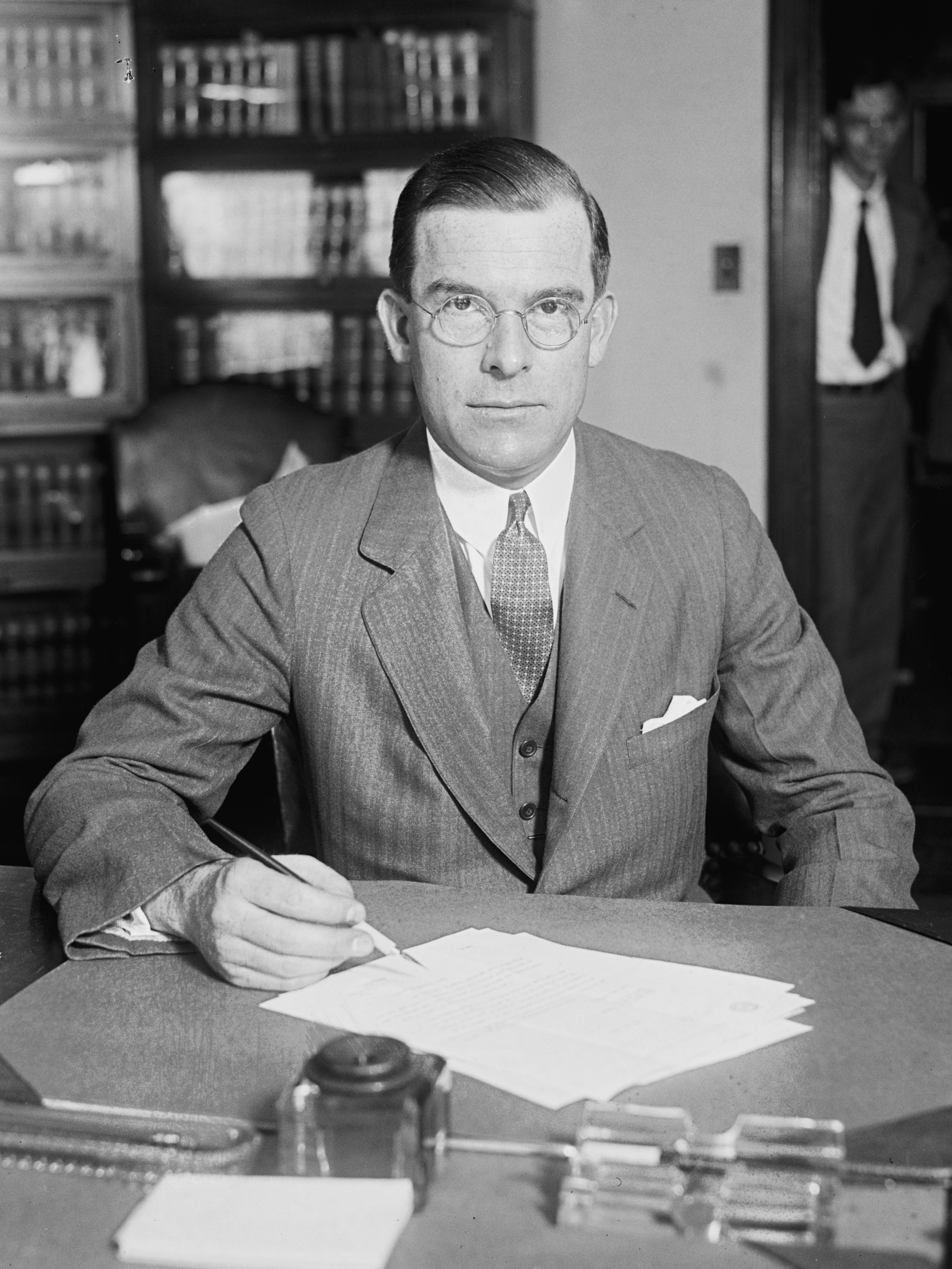
- Hughes at his desk, 1929

20th United States Solicitor General
- In office May 27, 1929 – April 16, 1930
- President: Herbert Hoover
- Preceded by: William D. Mitchell
- Succeeded by: Thomas D. Thacher

Personal details
- Born: November 30, 1889 New York City, U.S.
- Died: January 21, 1950 (aged 60) New York City, U.S.
- Resting place: Woodlawn Cemetery
- Party: Republican
- Spouse: Marjory Bruce Stuart (m. 1914)
- Children: 4, including H. Stuart Hughes and Charles Evans Hughes III
- Parent: Charles Evans Hughes
- Education: Brown University (AB); Harvard University (LLB)
- Occupation: Lawyer; Civil servant

Military service
- Allegiance: United States
- Branch/service: United States Army
- Years of service: 1917–1919
- Rank: Second lieutenant (1918)
- Unit: 77th Sustainment Brigade

Charles Evans Hughes Jr. (November 30, 1889 – January 21, 1950) was the United States Solicitor General from 1929 to 1930. He was the son of Supreme Court chief justice Charles Evans Hughes.

== Early life ==
Hughes was born in New York City on November 30, 1889. He was a son of Antoinette Ellen Carter Hughes (1864–1945) and Charles Evans Hughes, the former governor of New York who served as Chief Justice of the United States and 1916 Republican presidential nominee.

He was an honor graduate of Brown University where he was a member of Delta Upsilon fraternity. After Brown he attended the Harvard Law School, serving as the president of the Harvard Law Review during his third and final year there. He graduated from Harvard Law School in 1912.

== Career ==
Admitted to the bar in 1913, Hughes was secretary to New York Judge (and future Supreme Court of the United States Justice) Benjamin N. Cardozo from 1914 to 1916.

After practicing corporate law briefly, Hughes joined the United States Army as a private shortly after U.S. entry into World War I. Serving in field artillery, he was eventually commissioned a second lieutenant on July 12, 1918. He served as an instructor at the artillery school at Saumur and was assigned to the intelligence section of the AEF headquarters in February 1919. He was then assigned to the 77th Division as an aide-de-camp to Brigadier General Pelham D. Glassford. He returned to the United States on April 29 and was discharged on May 9, 1919.

Upon returning from the war, Hughes resumed the practice of primarily corporate law. Hughes practiced in the firm founded by his father, Charles Evans Hughes Sr., then known as Carter, Hughes & Cravath (later known as Hughes Hubbard & Reed).

=== Solicitor General ===
Appointed Solicitor General by Herbert Hoover, Hughes was compelled to resign in order to avoid the appearance of a conflict of interest when Hoover nominated Hughes's father to be Chief Justice of the United States. Hughes re-joined Carter, Hughes & Cravath. He also served on the board of directors of New York Life Insurance Company from 1930 to 1934.

Judge Learned Hand once observed that Charles Evans Hughes Sr. was the greatest lawyer he had ever known, "except that his son was even greater."

== Personal life ==
On June 18, 1914, Hughes was married to Marjory Bruce Stuart in the little Chapel of St. Saviour, in the Cathedral of St. John the Divine in Morningside Heights, Manhattan. Marjory, then a senior at Vassar College (her roommate was the groom's sister, Helen Hughes), was a daughter of Henry Clarence Stuart. Together, they were the parents of two sons and two daughters:

- Charles Evans Hughes III (1915–1985), an architect.
- H. Stuart Hughes (1916–1999), a noted historian and activist
- Helen Hughes, who was named after Hughes's sister Helen Hughes, who died at age 28 in 1920.
- Marjory Bruce Hughes (1929–2014), who married William Lee Johnson in 1952, the former general counsel of Otis Elevator Company.

He died of a brain tumor on January 21, 1950, and was buried at Woodlawn Cemetery in Bronx, New York.

Legal offices
Preceded by William D. Mitchell	Solicitor General; 1929–1930	Succeeded by Thomas D. Thacher
