= Robert E. Millette =

Grenadian diplomat

Robert E. Millette served as Ambassador of Grenada to the United Nations from 1995 to 1998. During his tenure, Millette assisted the prime minister and the Ministry of Foreign Affairs in securing millions of dollars for infrastructural projects including the stadium and the Ministerial complex.

Since returning to academia in 1998, Millette has conducted research in areas such as Public Sector Reform, the United Nations, and leadership and shared governance at Historically Black Colleges and Universities (HBCU). As Professor of Sociology at Lincoln University (Pennsylvania) since 1984, Milette teaches sociology and serves as Director of the Global Studies Institute. He has authored books on Black families.
