= Charles Evans Hughes III =

American architect (1915–1985)

- Born: March 14, 1915; New York City, U.S.
- Died: January 7, 1985 (aged 69)
- Occupation: Architect

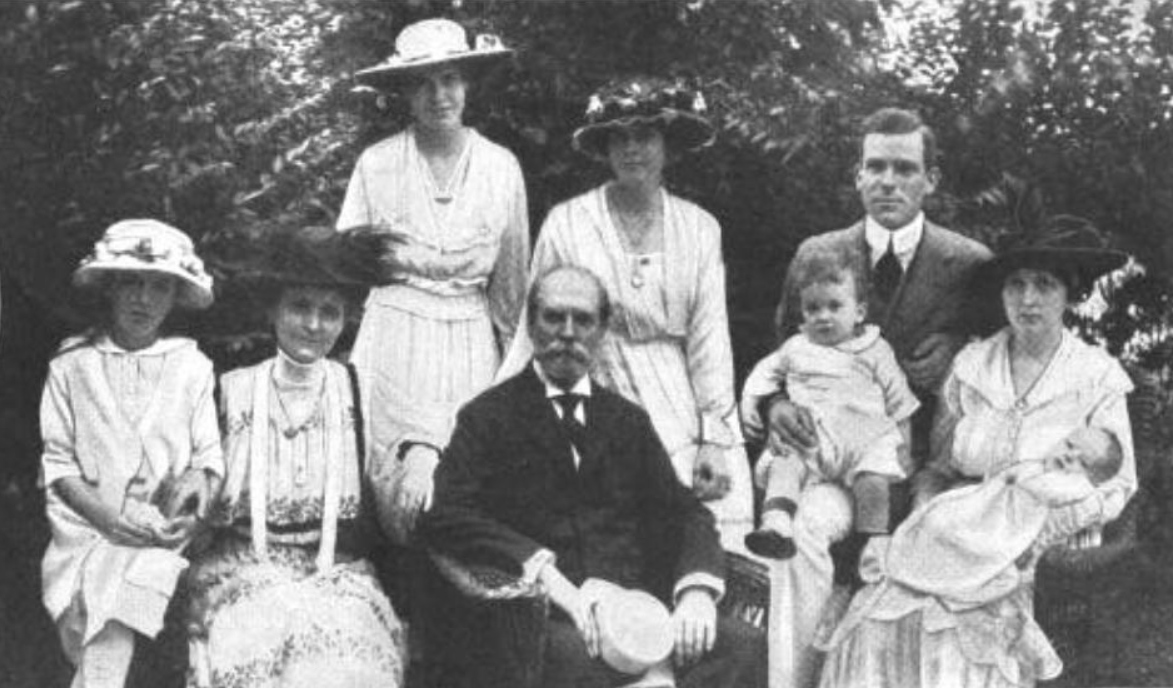
Charles Evans Hughes with his wife, children, grandchildren, and daughter-in-law, 1916.

Charles Evans Hughes III (March 14, 1915 – January 7, 1985) was an American architect. One of his most notable works was the Manufacturers Trust Company Building in New York City.

== Family ==
Hughes was the grandson of Chief Justice of the United States and 1916 Republican presidential nominee Charles Evans Hughes. He was the son of Charles Evans Hughes Jr., who served as United States Solicitor General in 1929 and 1930 under President Herbert Hoover.

== Early life ==
Hughes was born in New York City and was a resident of that city's Riverdale, Bronx. As a four year old boy, for Christmas 1919, Hughes visited his family in Glens Falls, New York; his aunt was gravely ill from diabetes, but treated him to newly-fashionable candy canes.

Hughes attended Brown University, where he won a major student speech prize in 1937, and was thus named one of the student speakers of his class at his graduation, as had been his father and grandfather. His grandfather gave an important speech at the same ceremony where he would receive his A.B., on the issue of authoritarianism, implicitly calling President Franklin D. Roosevelt a totalitarian due to the President's court-packing plan to force the Supreme Court of the United States to allow the New Deal to be ruled constitutional.

The younger Hughes later attended the Harvard Graduate School of Design. In World War II, he served as the gunnery officer on the USS Mullany (DD-528).

== Career ==
He was an architect with offices at East 61 Street, and mentored many other architects, who were nicknamed "his minions", including Norval White, co-author of the AIA Guide to NYC.

He was elected as an Associate of the New York chapter of the American Institute of Architects in 1941.

His best-known work is probably the Manufacturers Trust Company Building on Fifth Avenue and 43rd Street in Manhattan, New York City. According to the Real Estate News, "the revolution it inaugurated in bank design proved so successful throughout the world that one almost requires an act of historical imagination to realize what things were like before it was completed in 1954, according to designs by Gordon Bunshaft and Charles Evans Hughes III of Skidmore, Owings & Merrill." His first draft was "essentially what was built" of the visionary building. Norval White and his co-writers called it, "The building that led the banking profession out of the cellar and onto the street; a glass-sheathed supermarket of dollars," noting that Hughes had won an international award for his design. Hughes "received [a] $35 prize and credit for proposing a concept that changed the basis of bank hall design from ornate, bulky masses to the pristine lightness of the glass box."

One of his now historic commissions was the 1976 re-erection of the New York City Titanic Memorial.

== Private life ==
Hughes married a second time in December 1964, at the age of 49, to Kimberly Jean Wiss, 40, a freelance sportswriter and record-holding competitive fisher.

He was a longtime resident of Riverdale, at Independence Avenue and 252nd Street, where he was also a member of the Riverdale Yacht Club.
