= List of Grenadians =

This is a list of notable people from Grenada which includes people who were born in Grenada and people who contributed to the culture of the territory of Grenada.

== Actors ==
- Allister Bain (1932–2026), British actor and screenwriter, born in Grenada.
- George Harris (born 1949), Grenadian actor.
- Henry Stephenson (1871–1956), British actor, born in Grenada.

== Artists ==
- Canute Caliste (1914–2005), painter from Grenada.
- Denzil Forrester (born 1956), British painter born in Grenada.
- Anthony C. George (1938–2024), Grenadian artist, designer of the Flag of Grenada.

== Athletes ==
- Afy Fletcher in 2020
  Lucas Akins (born 1989), footballer playing for Grenada.
- Lyndon Antoine (born 1986), Grenadian footballer.
- Kithson Bain (born 1982), Grenadian footballer.
- Andray Baptiste (born 1977), Grenadian footballer.
- Kellon Baptiste (1973 - 2012), Grenadian footballer.
- Shandon Baptiste (born 1998), Grenadian footballer.
- Jacinta Bartholomew (born 1965), Grenadian Olympic long jumper.
- Rondell Bartholomew (born 1990), Grenadian athlete.
- Trish Bartholomew (born 1986), Grenadian sprinter.
- Kanika Beckles (born 1991), Grenadian sprinter.
- Omar Beckles (born 1991), Grenadian footballer.
- Jacob Bedeau (born 1999), footballer representing Grenada.
- Tony Bedeau (1979 - 2025), footballer representing Grenada.
- Jason Belfon (born 1990), Grenadian footballer.
- Kharlton Belmar (born 1992), footballer playing for Grenada.
- Jacob Berkeley-Agyepong (born 1997), footballer playing for Grenada.
- Neisha Bernard-Thomas (born 1981), Grenadian runner.
- Richard Britton (born 1976), Grenadian sprinter.
- Delron Felix (born 2000), Grenadian swimmer.
- Afy Fletcher (born 1987), Grenadian cricketer.
- Kimberly Ince (born 2004), Grenadian swimmer.
- Kirani James (born 1992), Grenadian sprinter who specialises in 200 and 400 meters.
- Anthony Modeste (born 1975), Grenadian footballer.
- Jason Roberts (born 1978), footballer who has played for Grenada.
- Junior Williams (born 1987), Grenadian footballer.
- Nicko Williams (born 1989), Grenadian footballer.
- D'Margio Wright-Phillips (born 2001), footballer playing for Grenada.

== Business people and agriculturalists ==
- Timothy Antoine, central banker.
- James Baillie (1737–1793), British merchant who owned a plantation in Grenada.
- Marie Rose Cavelan (c. 1752 – 1795), Grenadian planter and slave owner.
- Ambrose Hayling (1790–1854), Grenadian plantation and slave owner.
- Valda Henry, central banker.
- Louis Cazot La Grenade (1733–1808), Grenadian landowner, businessman and slave owner.
- Louis La Grenade II (c. 1776 – 1850), Grenadian estate-owner.
- Joseph Marryat (1757–1824), Grenadian plantation owner, politician, and merchant.
- Joseph Marryat (1790–1876), Grenadian shipowner, banker and merchant.
- Joachim Philip, planter and revolutionary from Grenada.
- Dorothea Christina Thomas (1796 - after 1846), wealthy free woman of color born in Grenada.

== Educators ==
- Eudine Barriteau (born 1954), professor of gender and public policy born in Grenada.
- Ron Buckmire (born 1968), mathematician and LGBT activist from Grenada.

== Medical people ==
- Conrad Murray (born 1953), American doctor born in Grenada.

== Military leaders ==
- Hudson Austin (1938 - 2022), Grenadian revolutionary and general.
- Johnson Beharry (born 1979), British Army soldier, born and raised in Grenada.
- Liam James (born 1955), revolutionary officer.

== Musicians ==
- Ajamu, Grenadian musician.
- Arthur Briggs (1901 - 1991), jazz trumpeter born in Grenada.
- Brother Valentino (1941–2026), musician born in Grenada.
- Dollarman, Grenadian musician.
- David Emmanuel, Grenadian musician.
- Leslie Hutchinson (1900–1969), Grenadian musician.
- Jemeni, musician and actress born in Grenada and raised in Canada.
- Mighty Sparrow (1935–2026), musician born in Grenada.
- Alex Pascall (born 1936), British broadcaster and musician born in Grenada.
- Sir Galba (1919–1957), musician born in Grenada.
- Sonika (born 1988), Grenadian singer and songwriter.

== Political leaders ==
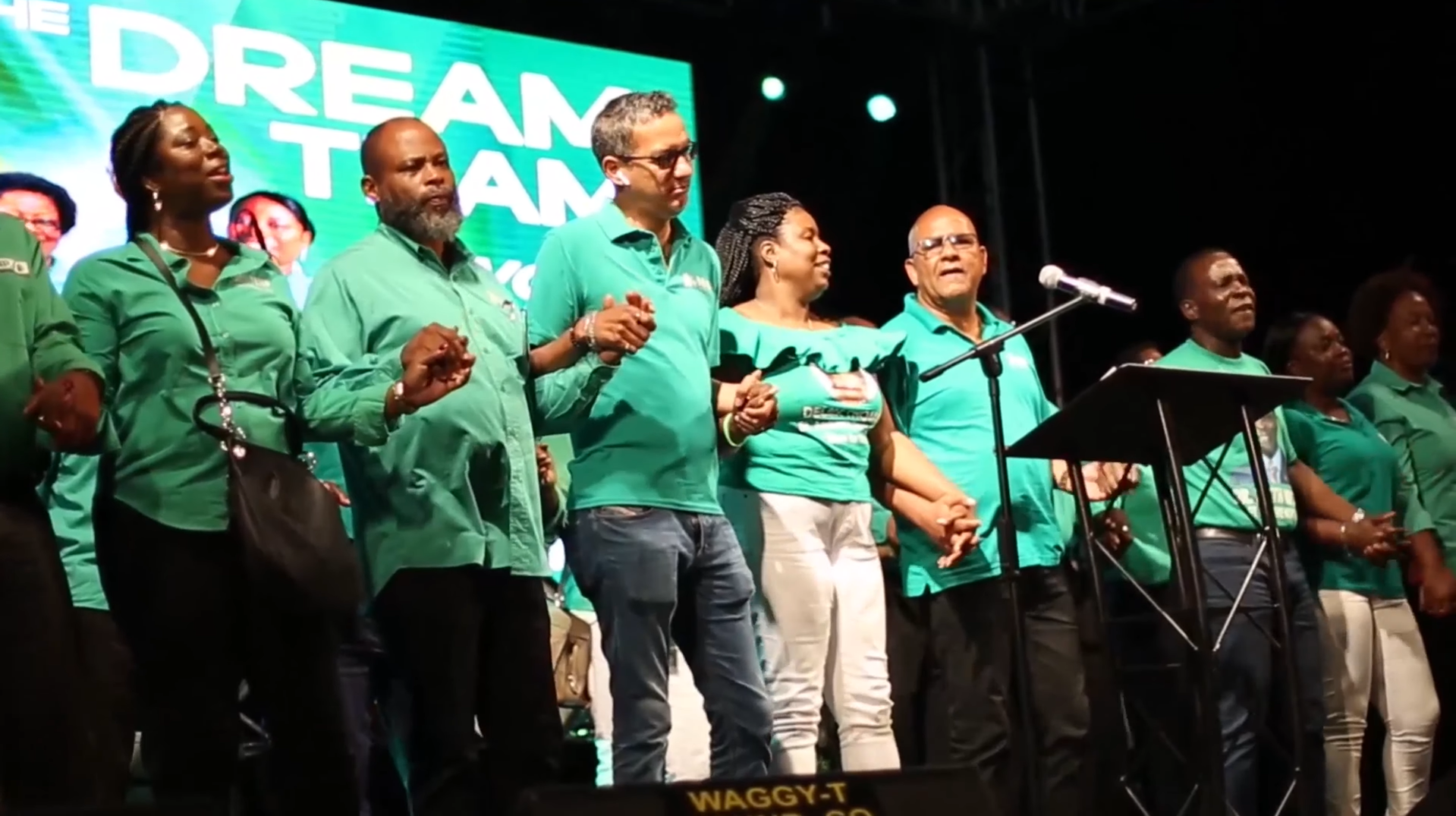
Campaign event of the New National Party, Grenada, 2018.

- Francis Alexis, Grenadian politician.
- Joseph Andall, Grenadian politician.
- Tevin Andrews, Grenadian politician.
- Jean Augustine (born 1937), Canadian politician born in Grenada.
- Yolande Bain-Horsford (born 1950), Grenadian politician.
- Fitzroy Bedeau (1944 - 2019), Grenadian politician and police officer.
- Franka Bernardine, Grenadian politician.
- Roland Bhola (born 1967), Grenadian politician.
- Maurice Bishop (1944–1983), Grenadian revolutionary.
- Herbert A. Blaize (1918–1989), Grenadian politician and leader of the Grenada National Party.
- Anthony Boatswain, Grenadian politician.
- Nicholas Brathwaite (1925–2016), Grenadian politician.
- George Brizan (1942 - 2012), Grenadian politician.
- Nazim Burke (born 1956), Grenadian politician.
- Tubal Uriah Butler (1897–1977), preacher and political leader in Grenada.
- Hilda Bynoe (1921 - 2013), first woman to serve as governor in Grenada.
- Leo Cato (born 1967), Grenadian politician.
- Henri Christophe (1767–1820), Haitian revolutionary, born in Grenada.
- Bernard Coard (born 1944), Grenadian politician.
- Phyllis Coard (1943–2020), Grenadian politician and women's rights activist.
- Ann David-Antoine (born 1949), Grenadian politician.
- Grace Duncan, Grenadian politician.
- Julien Fédon (died c. 1796), leader of a Grenadian slave revolt.
- Dia Forrester, attorney general in Grenada.
- Cynthia Gairy (1923 - 2018), Grenadian politician.
- Eric Gairy (1922–1997), first prime minister of Grenada.
- Richard Hart (1917 - 2013), Jamaican politician and historian who served in Grenada.
- Brenda Hood, Grenadian politician.
- Karl Hood, Grenadian politician.
- Claudette Joseph, Grenadian politician.
- Monica Joseph (1934 - 2023), Grenadian lawyer and judge.
- Oliver Joseph, Grenadian politician.
- Kenny Lalsingh, Grenadian politician and businessman.
- Michael D. Lett (1938 - 2013), Grenadian politician.
- T.A. Marryshow (1887–1958), Grenadian politician.
- Dickon Mitchell (born 1977), Grenadian politician.
- Keith Mitchell (born 1946), Grenadian politician.
- Clarice Modeste-Curwen, Grenadian politician.
- Margaret Neckles, Grenadian politician.
- Elvin Nimrod (1943–2021), politician from Carriacou.
- Gloria Payne-Banfield, Grenadian politician.
- Ann Peters, Grenadian politician.
- Emmalin Pierre (born 1975), Grenadian politician.
- David Pitt, Baron Pitt of Hampstead (1913–1994), British politician born in Grenada.
- Joan Purcell (born 1942), Grenadian politician.
- Sylvester Quarless, Grenadian politician.
- Glynis Roberts (born 1961), Grenadian politician.
- Paul Scoon (1935–2013), governor-general of Grenada.
- Leslie-Ann Seon, Grenadian lawyer and politician.
- Simon Stiell, Grenadian politician.
- Winnifred Strachan (1930 -2007), Grenadian politician.
- Tillman Thomas (born 1947), Grenadian politician.

== Religious leaders ==
- Sydney Anicetus Charles (1926 - 2018), served as Catholic bishop in Grenada.
- Vincent Darius (1955 - 2016), Catholic bishop in Grenada.
- Hoskins Huggins (died 2016), Anglican priest who served in Grenada.

== Writers and intellectuals ==
- Peggy Antrobus (born 1935), writer and activist born in Grenada.
- Alimenta Bishop (1914–2013), Grenadian activist.
- Tobias S. Buckell (born 1979), writer born in Grenada.
- Merle Collins (born 1950), poet raised on Grenada.
- Franklyn Harvey (1943–2016), Grenadian academic and founder of the New Jewel Movement.
- Alister Hughes (1919–2005), Grenadian journalist and poet.
- Oonya Kempadoo (born 1966), British writer who has lived in Grenada.
- Louise Little (1894 or 1897 – 1989), activist born in Grenada.
- Jacob Ross (born 1956), British writer, born in Grenada.

== Other ==
- Dexter Bristol (1960 - 2018), emigrant from Grenada.

== See also ==
- List of Eastern Caribbean people
