= 2008 Grenadian general election =

- 8 July 2008

All 15 seats in the House of Representatives 8 seats needed for a majority
- Registered: 71,751
- Turnout: 79.31% (▲21.59pp)
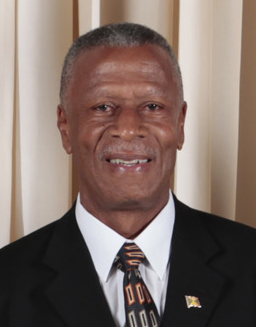

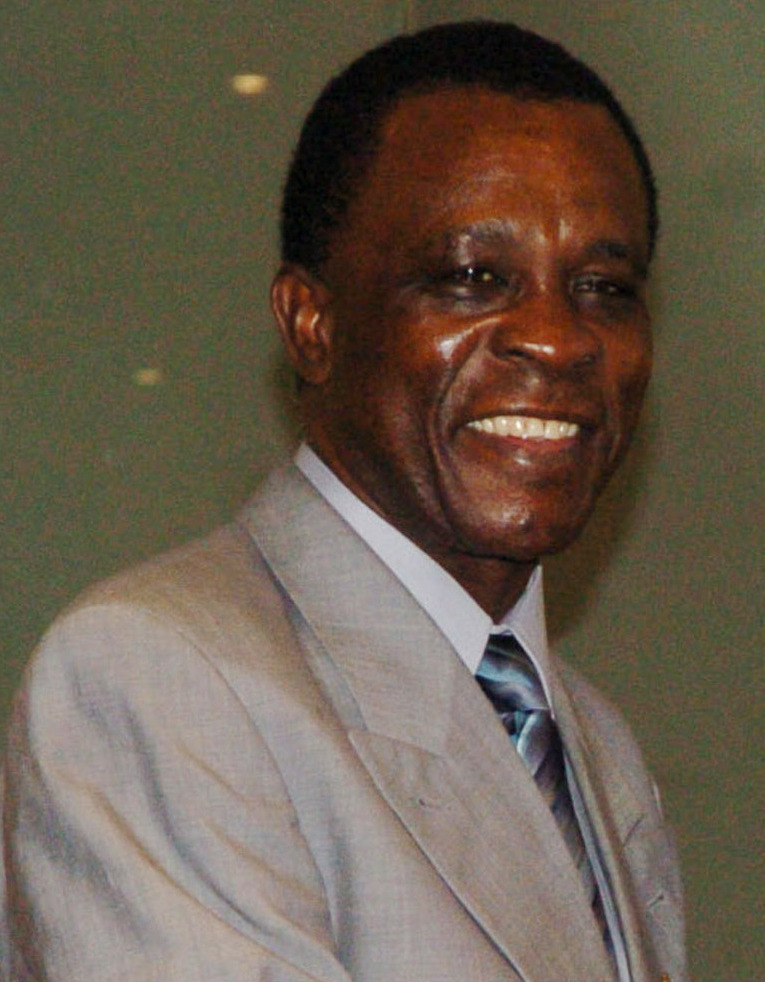
	First party	Second party
Leader	Tillman Thomas	Keith Mitchell
Party	NDC	NNP
Last election	45.40%, 7 seats	47.77%, 8 seats
Seats won	11	4
Seat change	▲4	▼4
Popular vote	29,007	27,189
Percentage	51.17%	47.96%
Swing	▲5.77pp	▲0.19pp
- Results by constituency
Prime Minister before election
Keith Mitchell
NNP
Elected Prime Minister
Tillman Thomas
NDC

General elections were held in Grenada on 8 July 2008. Out of a total of fifteen seats, the opposition National Democratic Congress (NDC) won eleven seats and the governing New National Party (NNP) won four, bringing the NDC to power for the first time since 1995. The NNP was looking for a fourth consecutive term in power, which would have been a first in Grenadian history.

== Campaign ==
In its election manifesto, which it debuted on June 25, 2008, the NNP promised the creation of 4,000 jobs, along with 4% growth in the economy.

== Opinion polls ==
A poll conducted by the Caribbean Development Research Services from June 6 to June 9 showed the NNP with 36.4% support, the NDC with 32.3% support, the Grenada United Labour Party (GULP) with 1.1% support, and the People's Labour Movement (PLM) with 0.8% support. The two later formed an electoral alliance, the Labour Platform.

== Results ==
In one notable outcome of the election, Deputy Prime Minister Gregory Bowen of the NNP was defeated in his constituency of St. George South East by Pastor Karl Hood of the NDC. Mitchell was re-elected from the constituency of St. George North West. The result was disproportional in terms of seats earned compared to votes obtained, with a Gallagher index measurement of 21.74.

Party	Votes	%	Seats	+/–
National Democratic Congress	29,007	51.17	11	+4
New National Party	27,189	47.96	4	–4
Labour Platform (GULP–PLM)	478	0.84	0	0
Independents	12	0.02	0	0
Total	56,686	100.00	15	0
Valid votes	56,686	99.61		
Invalid/blank votes	222	0.39		
Total votes	56,908	100.00		
Registered voters/turnout	71,751	79.31		
Source: Caribbean Elections

=== Elected members ===
Constituency	Member	Party
Carriacou and Petite Martinique	Elvin Nimrod	New National Party
Saint Andrew North East	Roland Bhola	New National Party
Saint Andrew North West	Alleyne Walker	National Democratic Congress
Saint Andrew South East	Patrick Simmons	National Democratic Congress
Saint Andrew South West	Sylvester Quarless	National Democratic Congress
Saint David	Denis Lett	National Democratic Congress
Saint George North East	Nazim Burke	National Democratic Congress
Saint George North West	Keith Mitchell	New National Party
Saint George South	Glynis Roberts	National Democratic Congress
Saint George South East	Karl Hood	National Democratic Congress
Town of St. George	Peter David	National Democratic Congress
Saint John	Michael Church	National Democratic Congress
Saint Mark	Clarice Modeste-Curwen	New National Party
Saint Patrick East	Tillman Thomas	National Democratic Congress
Saint Patrick West	Joseph Gilbert	National Democratic Congress

== Reactions ==
The Organization of American States (OAS) observed the elections, and it described "the electoral process in Grenada during the General Elections as extremely positive, with relatively few areas that could be improved." All of the polling sites were observed, and voters were calm and well-behaved.

A political party in nearby Dominica, the People's Democratic Movement, attributed the victory to Mitchell's "arrogance, intolerance to criticism and lack of consultation with the people" during his time in office.

== Aftermath ==
NDC leader Tillman Thomas succeeded the NNP's Keith Mitchell as Prime Minister of Grenada on July 9. He was sworn in at the Grenada Trade Centre in Grand Anse, St. George's by Governor-General Daniel Williams. On this occasion, Thomas promised "openness and transparency" and said that he would practice "the politics of inclusion". For his part, Mitchell said that the people voted for change and congratulated Thomas. Thomas's cabinet, composed of 17 members, was sworn in at the National Stadium on July 13. In addition to being Prime Minister, Thomas took the portfolios of Legal Affairs, National Security, Information, and Public Administration. Two members of non-governmental organizations who were not affiliated with the NDC were included in the cabinet: Franca Bernadine as Minister of Education and Human Resources, and Jimmy Bristol as Attorney-General.
