= Elections in Grenada =

Grenada elects a legislature on the national level. The Parliament of Grenada has two chambers. The House of Representatives has 15 members, elected for a five-year term in single-seat constituencies. The Senate has 13 appointed members. Grenada has a two-party system, which means that there are two dominant political parties, with extreme difficulty for anybody to achieve electoral success under the banner of any other party.

== Latest election ==
Party	Votes	%	Seats	+/–
National Democratic Congress	31,430	51.84	9	+9
New National Party	28,959	47.76	6	–9
Grenada United Labour Party	64	0.11	0	New
Independent Freedom Party	60	0.10	0	New
Grenada Renaissance Party	31	0.05	0	0
Independents	86	0.14	0	0
Total	60,630	100.00	15	0
Valid votes	60,630	99.49		
Invalid/blank votes	311	0.51		
Total votes	60,941	100.00		
Registered voters/turnout	86,658	70.32		
Source: Grenada Elections 2022

=== By constituency ===
Constituency	Electorate	Turnout	%	Political party	Candidate	Votes	%
Carriacou and Petite Martinique	5,414	3,780	69.81	National Democratic Congress	Tevin Andrews	1,954	51.69
Carriacou and Petite Martinique	5,414	3,780	69.81	New National Party	Kindra Stewart	1,805	47.75
St. Andrew North East	5,362	4,071	75.92	New National Party	Kate Lewis-Peters	2,190	53.79
St. Andrew North East	5,362	4,071	75.92	National Democratic Congress	Tessa St. Cyr	1,864	45.78
St. Andrew North East	5,362	4,071	75.92	Independent Freedom Party	Jennel Ramsee	10	0.24
St. Andrew North West	4,798	3,680	76.69	New National Party	Delma Thomas	1,898	51.57
St. Andrew North West	4,798	3,680	76.69	National Democratic Congress	Gloria Thomas	1,767	48.01
St. Andrew South East	4,868	3,571	73.35	New National Party	Emmalin Pierre	1,893	53.01
St. Andrew South East	4,868	3,571	73.35	National Democratic Congress	David Andrew	1660	46.48
St. Andrew South West	5,327	3,855	72.36	National Democratic Congress	Lennox Andrews	2,129	55.22
St. Andrew South West	5,327	3,855	72.36	New National Party	Yoland Bain-Horsford	1,704	44.20
St. David	9,866	7,189	72.86	National Democratic Congress	Dickon Mitchell	4,414	61.39
St. David	9,866	7,189	72.86	New National Party	Oliver Joseph	2,742	38.14
St. David	9,866	7,189	72.86	Independent Freedom Party	Junior Francis	18	0.25
St. George North East	7,727	5,390	69.75	National Democratic Congress	Ron Redhead	3,220	59.74
St. George North East	7,727	5,390	69.75	New National Party	Nimrod Ollivierre	2,133	39.57
St. George North East	7,727	5,390	69.75	Grenada Renaissance Party	Martin Edwards	15	0.27
St. George North West	4,534	2,995	66.05	New National Party	Keith Mitchell	2,211	73.82
St. George North West	4,534	2,995	66.05	National Democratic Congress	Jonathan LaCrette	773	25.80
St. George South	10,903	7,019	64.37	National Democratic Congress	Andy Williams	4,029	57.40
St. George South	10,903	7,019	64.37	New National Party	Sebastian Cox	2,961	42.18
St. George South	10,903	7,019	64.37	Grenada Renaissance Party	Mendell Samuel	12	0.17
St. George South East	5,413	3,800	70.20	National Democratic Congress	Alfred Telesford	2,122	55.84
St. George South East	5,413	3,800	70.20	New National Party	Gregory Bowen	1,634	43.0
St. George South East	5,413	3,800	70.20	Independent Freedom Party	Bassanio Nicholas	32	0.84
St. George South East	5,413	3,800	70.20	Grenada Renaissance Party	Dennyka Checkley	4	0.10
St. John	6,392	4,464	69.83	National Democratic Congress	Kerryne James	2,216	49.64
St. John	6,392	4,464	69.83	New National Party	Martin DaBreo	2,209	49.48
St. John	6,392	4,464	69.83	Grenada United Labour Party	Geoffrey Preudhomme	19	0.42
St. Mark	3,690	2,498	67.69	New National Party	Clarice Modeste-Curwen	1,470	58.84
St. Mark	3,690	2,498	67.69	National Democratic Congress	Quinc Britton	995	39.83
St. Mark	3,690	2,498	67.69	Grenada United Labour Party	David Francis	18	0.72
St. Patrick East	3,914	2,791	71.30	National Democratic Congress	Dennis Matthew-Cornwall	1,443	51.70
St. Patrick East	3,914	2,791	71.30	New National Party	Pamela Moses	1,322	47.36
St. Patrick East	3,914	2,791	71.30	Grenada United Labour Party	Nigel John	18	0.64
St. Patrick West	4,668	3,288	70.43	National Democratic Congress	Joseph Andall	1,726	52.49
St. Patrick West	4,668	3,288	70.43	New National Party	Victor Philip	1,458	44.34
St. Patrick West	4,668	3,288	70.43	Independent	Winston Frederick	86	2.61
St. Patrick West	4,668	3,288	70.43	Grenada United Labour Party	Augustine David	9	0.27
Town of St. George	3,781	2,462	65.11	New National Party	Peter David	1,329	53.98
Town of St. George	3,781	2,462	65.11	National Democratic Congress	Claudette Joseph	1,118	45.41
Source: Grenada Elections 2022

== See also ==
- Electoral calendar
- Electoral system
