= Afro-Grenadians =

Black Grenadians
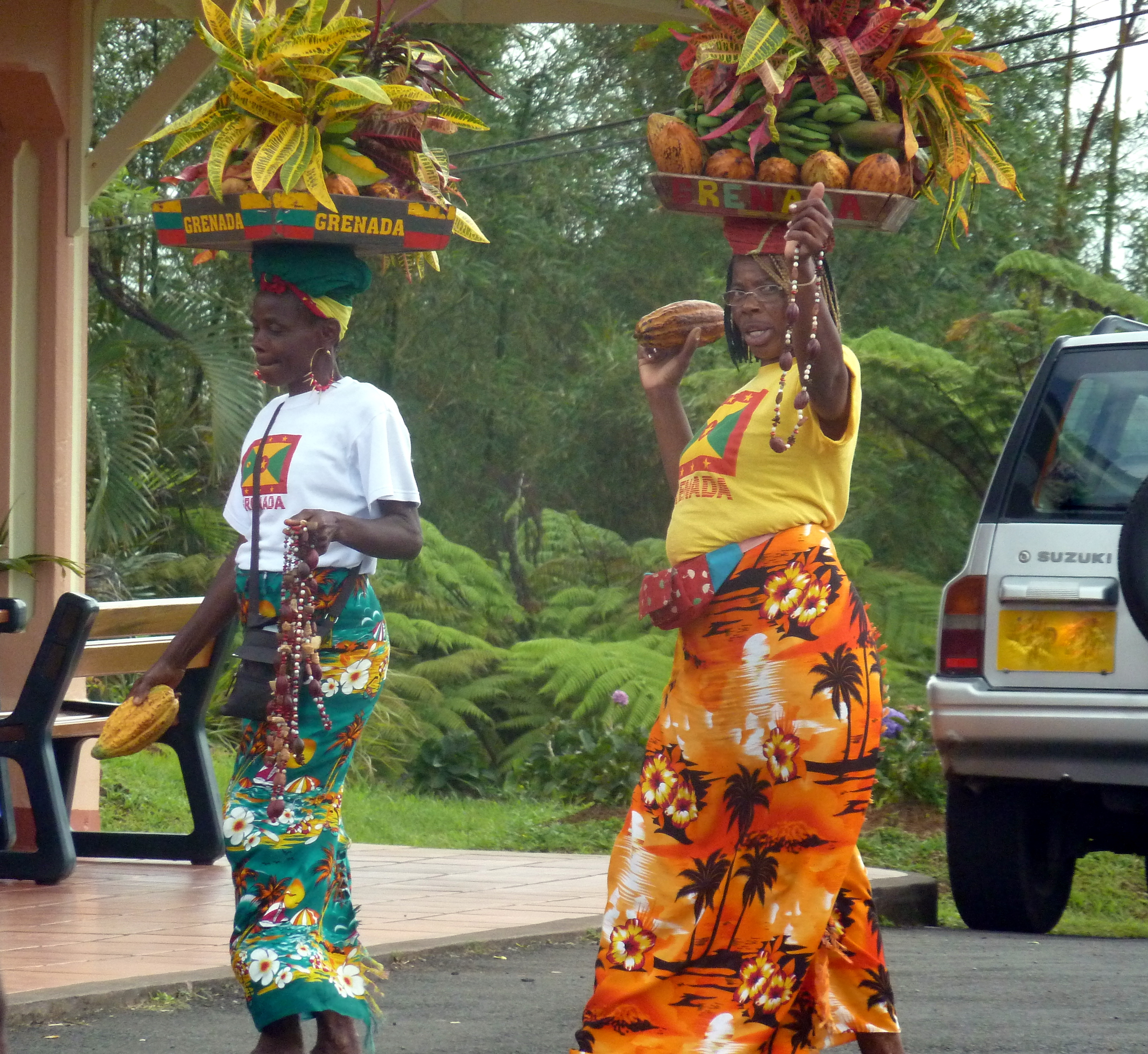

Total population
- 101,309

Regions with significant populations
- Grenada

Languages
- Mainly Grenadian Creole English, standard English, French and Grenadian Creole French

Religion
- Christianity, Afro-American religions, traditional African religions, Islam

Afro-Grenadians or Black Grenadians are Grenadian people who have ancestry from any of the Black racial groups of Africa. This term is not generally recognised by Grenadians. They usually refer to themselves simply as 'Grenadians' or 'Caribbean'. The term was coined by African American history professor John Henrik Clarke (1915–1998) in his piece entitled A Note on Racism in History. The term may also refer to a Grenadian of African ancestry. Social interpretations of race are mutable rather than deterministic and neither physical appearance nor ancestry are used straightforwardly to determine whether a person is considered a Black Grenadian. According to the 2012 Census, 82% of Grenada's population is Black, 13% is mixed European and black and 2% is of Indian origin. (Europeans are less than 1% of the population.)

== History ==
On 17 March 1649, a French expedition of 203 men from Martinique, led by Jacques Dyel du Parquet who had been the Governor of Martinique on behalf of the Compagnie des Iles de l'Amerique (Company of the Isles of America) since 1637, landed at St. Georges Harbour and constructed a fortified settlement, which they named Fort Annunciation. By 1700, Grenada had a population of 257 French (whites) and 53 coloureds with 525 enslaved Africans to work on 3 sugar estates and 52 indigo plantations.

More than half a century later, when Grenada was captured by the British during the Seven Years' War (1762) and formally ceded to Britain by the Treaty of Paris, the English began to import their own enslaved Africans for use on their cotton, sugar and tobacco plantations. It is believed that most of the slaves who were imported to Grenada embarked from Nigeria (specifically Igbo and Yoruba, more than 37,000, 34% of the enslaved people of the island) and Ghana (Fante people, more than 18,000, 19% of the enslaved people of the island). To a lesser extent, enslaved people were also imported from Senegambia (more than 5,000, 4.9% of the slaves of the island), Guinea, Sierra Leone (more than 12,000, 11% of the slaves of the island), Windward Coast (more than 14,000, 13% of the enslaved people of the island), Bight of Benin (more than 5,800, 5,4% of the slaves of the island), Congo (specifically Kongos) and Angola. The slaves of Central Africa numbered more than 12,000 people, 11% of the enslaved of Grenada. Many of the enslaved people were also Mandinka. The first British census of Grenada, in 1700, recorded 525 slaves and 53 freed from slavery living on the island. Julien Fédon, a mulatto plantation owner of the Belvedere estate in the St. John Parish, led a violent rebellion against British rule on the night of 2 March 1795. Clearly influenced by the ideas emerging from the French Revolution, especially the Convention's abolition of slavery in 1794, Fédon and his troops took control of all of Grenada (except the parish of St. George's, the seat of government), who afterwards freed the slaves who participated in the rebellion. The struggle of the enslaved for their rights continued for a year and a half (between March 1795 and June 1796), until the British regained control of the island. The British, as a punishment for disobedience and rebellion, executed the alleged leaders of the rebellion, however, Fédon was never captured. Slavery in Grenada was finally abolished by British law in 1834, and all enslaved people were freed by 1 August 1838.

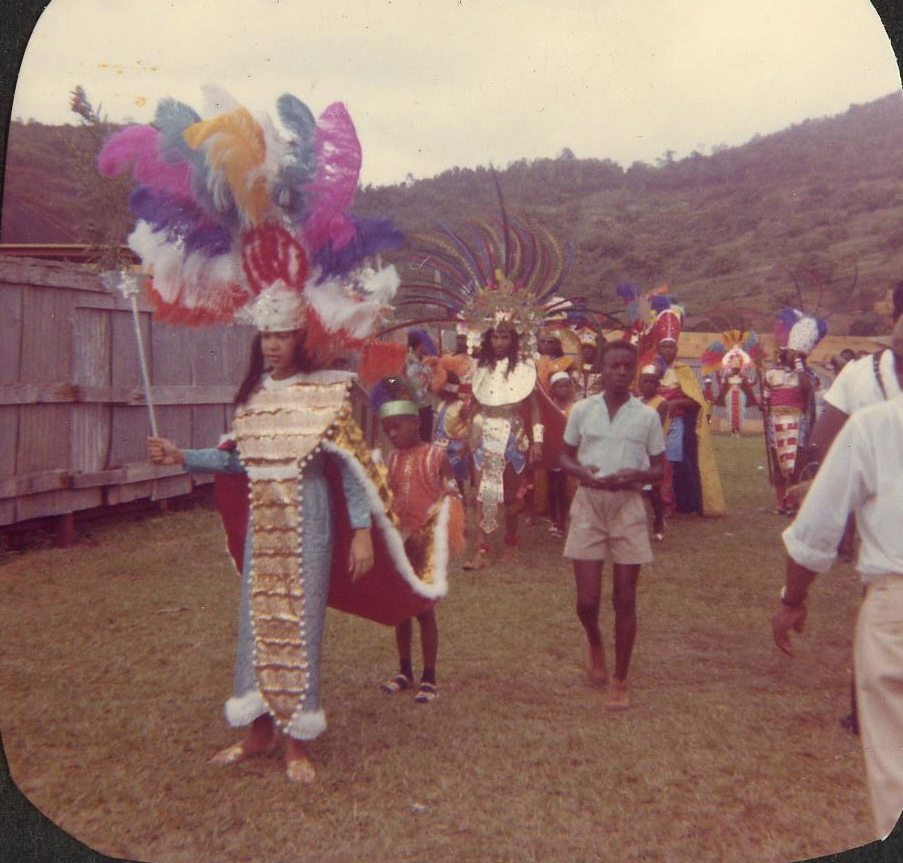
Grenada Carnival

== Religious groups ==
Most black Grenadians are Christian, with the largest groups being Roman Catholics and Anglicans. There is also a Muslim minority of black Grenadians.

== Genetics ==
===== Autosomal DNA =====
In addition to being found to have 6.8% (±4.6%) Native American and 12.1% (±11.2%) European ancestry, Afro-Grenadians, who were sampled in 2013, were found to be 81.1% (±11.3%) West African.

== Notable black Grenadians ==
- Alleyne Francique
- Antonio German, (Grenadian parents)
- Ricky German (Grenadian parents)
- Cameron Jerome, (Grenadian parents)
- Dejon Noel-Williams, (Grenadian grandfather)
- Eric Gairy
- Gifton Noel-Williams
- Herbert Blaize
- Ben Jones
- Darren Modoo
- Nathaniel Clyne (Grenadian parents)
- Nicholas Brathwaite
- George Brizan
- Amanda Seales (Grenadian mother)
- Lewis Hamilton (Grenadian grandfather)
- Kairo Mitchell (grenadian father)
- Keith Mitchell
- Tillman Thomas
- Kirani James
- Paul Scoon
- Alister Hughes
- Maurice Bishop
- Johnson Beharry
- Yazmeen Jamieson (Grenadian mother)
- Malcolm X (Grenadian mother)
- Craig David (Grenadian father)
- Jason Roberts (Grenadian parents)
- Jason Belfon
- Jermaine Beckford (Grenadian mother)
- Josh Gabriel
- Saydrel Lewis
- Shavon John-Brown (Grenadian Parents)
- Jean Augustine
