= Governor of the Eastern Caribbean Central Bank =

Governor of the Executive Committee of the Eastern Caribbean Central Bank
- Incumbent; Timothy Antoine since February 1, 2016
- Website: Biography

The governor of the Eastern Caribbean Central Bank is the head of the central banking system of the Eastern Caribbean region. To date there have been three governors, with the incumbent Timothy Antoine in office since February 2016.

== Governors of the Eastern Caribbean Central Bank ==
List of governors of the Eastern Caribbean Central Bank
No.	Governor	Nationality	In office		Ref.
1	Sir Cecil Jacobs	Saint Kitts and Nevis	5 July 1983	1989	
2	Sir K. Dwight Venner	Saint Vincent and the Grenadines	December 1989	November 2015	
3	Timothy Antoine	Grenada	February 2016	present	
