= Marcel Peters =

Speaker of the House of Representatives of Grenada
- In office April 1990 – June 1995
- Prime Minister: Nicholas Brathwaite; George Brizan
- Preceded by: Hudson Scipio
- Succeeded by: Sir Curtis Strachan

Personal details
- Born: ca. 1930-1932
- Died: January 2017
- Party: Grenada United Labour Party; Grenada Democratic Labour Party; National Democratic Congress

Marcel Peters was a politician from Grenada and former Speaker of the House of Representatives.

Peters was 53 years old in 1984, so he was born about 1930-1932.

In the elections of December 1984, he was elected as the sole opposition members from Grenada United Labour Party (GULP). In 1985, he was later expelled from GULP, and formed Grenada Democratic Labour Party with Winston Whyte. He held the seat of St. Andrew’s North East constituency. He held the post of Leader of the Opposition from 1984 until his resignation in February 1987.

Peters was Speaker of the House of Representatives from 1990 to 1995 during the National Democratic Congress (NDC) administration of Nicholas Brathwaite.

He died in January 2017.
