= TNP =

TNP or Tnp may refer to:

- Triglav National Park, Julian Alps, Slovenia
- 2,4,6-trinitrophenol, better known as picric acid
- The Twentynine Palms Airport, California, US
- The Théâtre National Populaire, Villeurbanne, France
- These New Puritans a UK rock band
- Transposase, an enzyme
- The National Party, a political party in Grenada
- The New Pornographers, a Canadian indie-rock band
- The Northrop Podcast, a high school podcast located in Fort Wayne, Indiana
