= David Emmanuel =

David Emmanuel is the name of:

- David Emmanuel (mathematician) (1854–1941), Romanian mathematician
- David Emmanuel (musician), Grenadian musician
- Smiley Culture (1963–2011), born David Victor Emmanuel, British musician

== See also ==
- David Emanuel (disambiguation)
