= Ministry of Finance (Grenada) =

Agency overview
- Jurisdiction: Grenada Government of Grenada
- Headquarters: Financial Complex, St. George's
- Minister responsible: David Andrew, Minister of Finance
- Parent agency: Government of Grenada
- Website: www.gov.gd/mof/ministry-overview

The Ministry of Finance is a government ministry of Grenada responsible for the management of public finances, economic planning and budgeting.

== Ministers of Finance ==
Name	Took office	Left office	Premier / Prime Minister
Herbert Blaize	1961	1961	Herbert Blaize
George E. D. Clyne	March 1961	August 1961	George E. D. Clyne
Eric Gairy	August 1961	June 1962	Eric Gairy
Herbert Blaize	1962	1967	Herbert Blaize
George Frederick Hosten	1967	1979	Eric Gairy
Bernard Coard	1979	1983	Maurice Bishop
Nazim Burke	1983	1983	Bernard Coard
Allen Kirton	1983	1984	Nicholas Brathwaite
Herbert Blaize	1984	1989	Herbert Blaize
Ben Jones	1989	1990	Ben Jones
George Brizan	1990	1992	Nicholas Brathwaite
Nicholas Brathwaite	1992	1995	Nicholas Brathwaite
Michael Andrew	1995	1995	George Brizan
Keith Mitchell	1995	1997	Keith Mitchell
Patrick Bubb	1997	1999	Keith Mitchell
Keith Mitchell	1999	1999	Keith Mitchell
Anthony Boatswain	1999	2007	Keith Mitchell
Keith Mitchell	2007	2008	Keith Mitchell
Nazim Burke	2008	2013	Tillman Thomas
Keith Mitchell	2013	2020	Keith Mitchell
Gregory Bowen	2020	2022	Keith Mitchell
Dickon Mitchell	2022	2023	Dickon Mitchell
Dennis Cornwall	2023	2026	Dickon Mitchell
David Andrew	2026	Incumbent	Dickon Mitchell

== See also ==
- Government of Grenada
- Eastern Caribbean Central Bank
- Economy of Grenada
- Ministry of Finance (Guyana)
- Ministry of Finance (Trinidad and Tobago)
- Ministry of Economy and Finance (Venezuela)
