= Joseph Gilbert =

Joseph Gilbert may refer to:

- Joseph Gilbert (Royal Navy officer) (1732–1821), English naval officer, master of HMS Resolution on Cook's second voyage
- Joseph Gilbert (minister) (1779–1852), English Congregational minister
- Joseph Gilbert (politician) (20th century), Grenadian politician
- Joe Gilbert (musician) (1940–1966), American singer, of Joe and Eddie
- Joseph Gilbert (RAF officer) (born 1931), British air marshal
- Joseph Henry Gilbert (1817–1901), English chemist
- Joseph Gilbert (winemaker) (1800–1881), South Australian pastoralist
- Joe Gilbert (baseball) (born 1952), former Major League Baseball pitcher
- Joey Gilbert (born 1976), retired professional boxer
- Joseph Trounsell Gilbert (1888–1975), Bermudan barrister, judge and politician
- Joseph Francis Gilbert, British landscape painter and draughtsman
- Joe Gilbert (American football), college and NFL coach
- Joseph Gilbert (cricketer) (fl. 1789–1792), English cricketer

== See also ==
- Edward Joseph Gilbert (born 1936), American born Catholic bishop of the Antilles
- Sir Gilbert Joseph Cullen Dyett, CMG (1891–1964), Australian World War I veteran
- Joseph Gilbert Totten (1788–1864), fought in the War of 1812
- Joseph Gilbert Hamilton (1907–1957), American professor of medical physics
- Nicolas Joseph Laurent Gilbert (1750–1780), French poet
- Tookie Gilbert (Harold Joseph Gilbert, 1929–1967), American first baseman
