= History of Carriacou =

Carriacou is the largest island of the Grenadines, an archipelago in the Windward Islands chain in the Caribbean Sea.

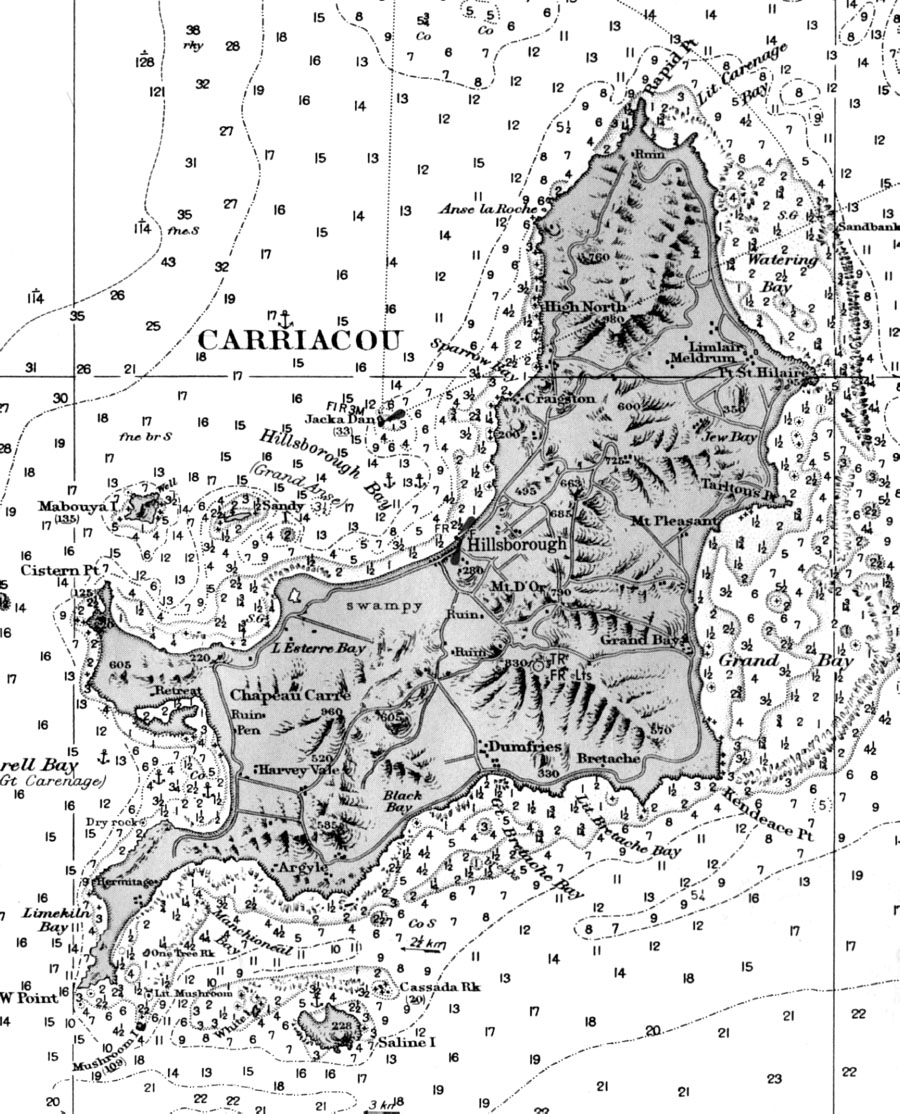
Nautical Chart of Carriacou from 1891

== Early years ==
Between 400 and 100 BC, Stone Age people from South America introduced the psychedelic drug cohoba into the island. Between 500 and 1000 AD another wave of settlers came to Carriacou. By 1000 AD the Arawaks were living on the island. Some time later, the Caribs settled there, conquering or displacing the earlier inhabitants.

== European discovery ==
- In 1656 the first European to visit the island was the Frenchman Père du Tertre, a turtle fisherman from Guadeloupe. In his history of the Antilles he said, “The most beautiful of all the little isles is Carriacou...”
- In the 18th century, cotton, sugar and indigo plantations were established on the island by the English. They also built water channels which brought water from the hills for use in irrigation.
- In 1720, the pirate Bartholomew Roberts captured a French ship near Carriacou and commandeered it, renaming it Royal Fortune.
- In 1750, the first census of the island was conducted. There were 199 people living there, 92 whites, 92 blacks and 15 mulattos.

== British Empire ==
- In 1763 Carriacou was ceded with Grenada to the British and became part of the British Empire.
- Before 1769 there was an attempt to produce indigo at the Meldrum Estate.
- On the 22 June 1770, Captain John Urquhart bought Grand Anse Estate Plantation.
- In 1776, the island population was 3,239 (86 whites and 3,153 slaves) people, not counting the free blacks and the free mulattos.
- The estate of Cistern began construction in 1782.
- Between 1783 and 1793 it was established that the glebe land belonged to the priest.
- The estate of Cistern was completed in 1786.
- In 1788 the Craigston and Meldrum Estates were the property of William Urquhart of Craigston.
- About 1790 a ship from Glasgow, Scotland came to Carriacou.
- In 1790 there were 46 estates in Carriacou.
- In 1791, Gun Point (Rapid Point) which had been a division of the Grenadines was made latitude on the island, but the point belonged to Saint Vincent and the rest of Carriacou belonged to Grenada.
- In 1793 there were 23 estates on the island, of which the Craigston, Meldrum and Prospect estates were the largest.
- In 1796 there were a large number of sailing vessels in Hillsborough Bay when Sir Ralph Abercromby met there to launch an attack on the Spanish.
- In 1769–1815 the Craigston estate became a cotton plantation.
- In the 19th century, the Pierrot Mas was first introduced to Carriacou.
- In 1810 the Belvedere great house was built.

== Slavery abolished ==
- In 1870, Stephen Joseph Perry was in charge of a government expedition to observe a solar eclipse at Carriacou.
- In 1891 a few wells were sunk to find ground water.
- In 1902 the Harvey Vale was divided into 244 lots.
- On March 2, 1914, a Black man name Samuel Corion (Planter) bought Grand Anse Estate from Henry St. Barbe Goldsmith of London and Smith Bank Chancery Lane, London.
- In 1920 limes were grown commercially on Carriacou until the turn of the 20th century, but they became unprofitable so many of the groves were abandoned and production was transferred to Grenada. A well was built to provide a constant source of water for livestock at Limlair.
- In 1922, Petite Charles first introduced the Jab Jab (Devil) Mas to Carriacou.
- The estate of Cistern was bought by George Kent in 1927.
- In 1941 there was estimated to be at around 4 inches of rainfall per month.
- The Jehovah’s Witnesses were established on the island in 1951 and the Evangelists in 1956.
- In 1960 Herbert Blaize became the first chief minister of Grenada to come from Carriacou.
- The telephone system began operating in 1961 on the island of Carriacou.
- Bishop's College was the first Secondary School in Carriacou; it was opened in 1964 by the Anglican Church.
- In 1965, the Carriacou Regatta was first held.
- In 1968, Lauriston airport was opened.

== Independence ==
- Grenada obtained its independence from the United Kingdom on Thursday 7 February 1974.
- On October 31, 1975, the Carriacou Carib Organization (Big Drum Dance Organization) was started.
- In 1977 Betsy Traylor was the first warden of the Carriacou Museum on Paterson Street.
- The lime factory (Craigston Great House) is the most historical landmark and was in operation until 1981.
- In 1983 Nicholas Brathwaite became the first Prime Minister of Grenada to have originated in Carriacou.
- In 1992 there was a Spiritual battle from the first day, bringing Gospel to Windward Church.
- In 1998 the land use plan for Carriacou and Petite Martinique put it under the 1988 OAS System plan.
- In 1999 Hurricane Lenny caused considerable damage to the island.

== After 2000 ==
- In 2001 a reconstruction of the major commercial road network island-wide was undertaken.
- In 2005 Hurricane Emily caused strong winds and heavy rainfall on the island.
- In 2008 Rawle Paterson was the first Carriacouan and Caribbean person to receive a top award at a Chinese university (the university he attended was the University of China in Beijing)
- On Tuesday, 27 May 2008 the New National Party (NNP) Grenada organised the largest gathering in Carriacou history at the Digg Playing Field in Harvey Vale and there were 7,000 people (green clad) at the event.
- On July 1, 2024, Hurricane Beryl made landfall with sustained winds of 150 mph (240 km/h), becoming the strongest hurricane to hit the island.
