= 2026 Grenadian general election =

- 5 November 2026

All 15 seats in the House of Representatives 8 seats needed for a majority
- Turnout: 63.49% (▼6.83pp)
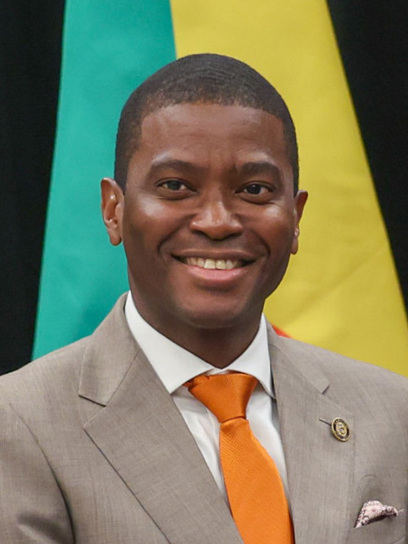

	First party	Second party
Leader	Dickon Mitchell	Emmalin Pierre
Party	NDC	NNP
Last election	51.84%, 9 seats	47.08%, 6 seats
Seats won	14	1
Seat change	▲5	▼5
Popular vote	37,373	22,618
Percentage	60.95%	36.89%
- Results by constituency
Prime Minister before election
Dickon Mitchell
NDC
Elected Prime Minister
Dickon Mitchell
NDC

General elections were held in Grenada on 5 November 2026. Incumbent Prime Minister Dickon Mitchell sought a second term. The National Democratic Congress (NDC) defeated the New National Party (NNP) in a landslide victory, with the NDC winning 14 of the 15 seats up for election.

== Background ==
Starting in September 2026 voices within the ruling National Democratic Congress (NDC) began considering calling a snap election after opposition leader Emmalin Pierre of the New National Party (NNP) began telling a number of Constituents that she will become the first female prime minister at the next elections. This came after a national poll in August which showed the NNP at a slight advantage over the NDC. On October 4 Prime Minister Dickon Mitchell dissolved the House of Representatives and called for new snap elections to be held on 5 November 2026.

== Electoral system ==
With this election, Prime Minister Mitchell introduced the practice of sounding a conch horn, instead of ringing a bell as is the case in most Commonwealth Caribbean nations, to announce snap elections. Since colonial times, messengers on foot would go from village to village blowing a conch horn for major events such as funerals and festivals.

The 15 members of the House of Representatives are elected by first-past-the-post voting in single-member constituencies.

== Opinion polling ==
=== Voting intentions ===
Polling firm	Date of polling	Ref.	NDC	NNP	Others	Undecided	Sample Size	Lead
2026 election	5 November 2026	-	61.0	36.8	2.2	-	61,605	24.2
Only Polls	5-14 October 2026		63.1	36.9	-	-	904	26.2
Snap elections called 4 October 2026
DPB Research	16 August 2026		48.6	51.4	-	-	4,142	2.8
DPB Research	20 June 2026		50.2	47.1	1.2	1.5	3,800	3.1
DPB Research	14 March 2026		52.4	44.8	1	1.8	3,500	7.6
2022 election	23 June 2022		51.84	47.76	0.4	-	60,941	4.08

=== Seat projections ===
Polling firm	Ref.	NDC	NNP	Others
2026 election	-	14	1	-
Only Polls		11	4	-
2022 election		9	6	-

== Results ==
Graph of the party split among 15 seats.
Party	Votes	%	Seats	+/–
National Democratic Congress	37,373	60.95	14	+5
New National Party	22,618	36.89	1	–5
Democratic People's Movement	1,186	1.93	0	New
People's National Party	69	0.11	0	New
Grenada United Labour Party	35	0.06	0	0
Grenada Social Democratic Party	27	0.04	0	New
Change of Hope for Grenada Carriacou & Petite Martinique	5	0.01	0	New
Grenada Renaissance Party	4	0.01	0	0
Total	61,317	100.00	15	0
Valid votes	61,317	99.68		
Invalid/blank votes	194	0.32		
Total votes	61,511	100.00		
Registered voters/turnout	97,077	63.36		
Source: Parliamentary Elections Office

== Aftermath ==
The election resulted in a landslide victory for the ruling National Democratic Congress and their leader Dickon Mitchell, winning 14 of the 15 seats up for election, the largest victory in NDC history. It was also the first time the NDC won consecutive elections. The New National Party suffered one of its worst results in party history, electing only 1 MP, Adrian Joseph. NNP leader Emmalin Pierre lost her seat to education minister David Andrew. The other major opposition leader, former foreign affairs minister Peter David of the Democratic People's Movement (DPM), also lost his seat.

Political analyst Derek Ramsamooj noted that the victory was likely due to Mitchell delivering a better quality of life with his "Manifesto 2022" while it was "the end of the political era of the NNP" which will, at best, have to be rebuilt from the ground up with new leadership.
