= Ann Peters =

Grenadian politician

Ann Peters is a Grenadian politician who previously served as health minister. A nurse by training, Peters has also served as a senator for the National Democratic Congress party and as president of the Grenada Nurses Association.

== Biography ==
Born in Grenada, Peters trained as a nurse at the University of Guyana. She worked as a nursing teacher, eventually becoming president of the Grenada Nurses Association.

She was in this role during the 1983 coup and subsequent U.S. invasion of Grenada. Peters and her fellow nurses joined other protesters in storming the military barracks to free the leftist prime minister Maurice Bishop, and she was shot and badly injured during his opponents' attack on the fort. She was with Bishop during his final hours before he was killed on Oct. 19, though she survived the executions herself.

After 1983, Peters continued to work in health care, running the Legal Aid and Counseling Clinic and serving as chair of Grenada's National AIDS Council.

She was appointed to Senate of Grenada by Prime Minister Nicholas Brathwaite in 1995, as a member of the National Democratic Congress party. She served from 1995 to 1999 and again since 2008. She served as the party's public relations officer from 2009 until 2010, when she stepped down amid party infighting.

Peters became health minister in 2009 amid a cabinet reshuffle under Prime Minister Tillman Thomas. She oversaw the provision of health services in Grenada and represented the country in international bodies until the end of her term in 2013.

Since leaving the Senate, Peters has run La Boucan Creative Center, an education center.

Peters is also a singer and dancer, serving as choreographer for the National Performing Arts Company of Grenada from 1979 to 1983. She and her husband, the playwright Francis Urias Peters, produced a play about the country's revolution for its 30th anniversary in 2013.
