= 1990 Grenadian general election =

- 13 March 1990

All 15 seats in the House of Representatives 8 seats needed for a majority
- Registered: 58,374
- Turnout: 68.42% (▼17.77pp)
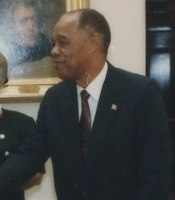

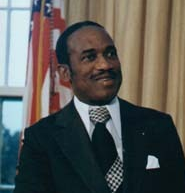

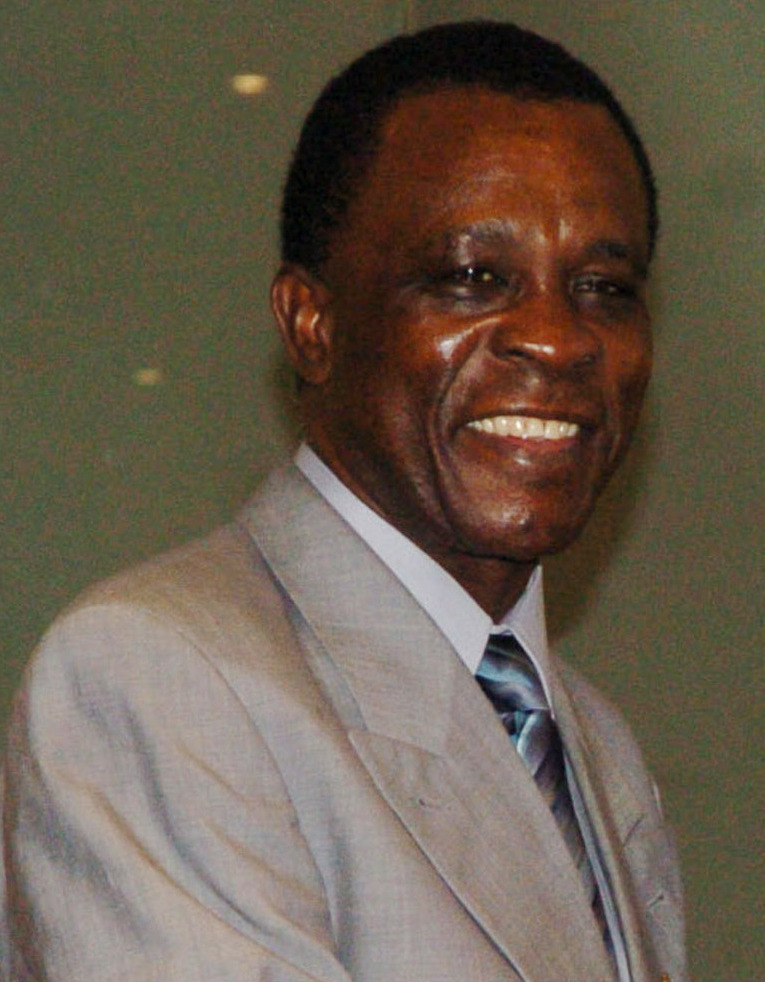

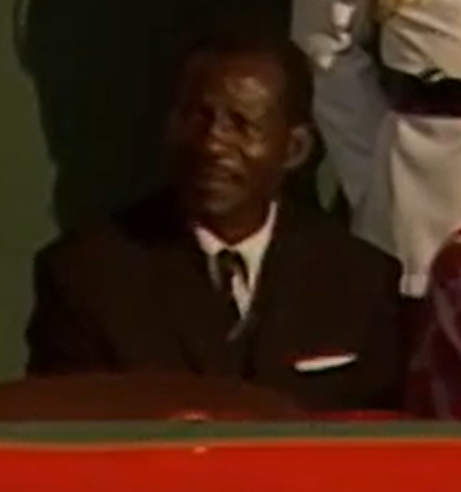
	First party	Second party
Leader	Nicholas Brathwaite	Eric Gairy
Party	NDC	GULP
Last election	–	35.88%, 1 seat
Seats won	7	4
Seat change	New	▲3
Popular vote	13,637	11,105
Percentage	34.55%	28.13%
Swing	New	▼7.75pp
	Third party	Fourth party
Leader	Keith Mitchell	Ben Jones
Party	NNP	NP
Last election	58.61%, 14 seats	–
Seats won	2	2
Seat change	▼12	New
Popular vote	6,916	6,854
Percentage	17.52%	17.36%
Swing	▼41.09pp	New
- Winning party by constituency
Prime Minister before election
Ben Jones
NP
Elected Prime Minister
Nicholas Brathwaite
NDC

General elections were held in Grenada on 13 March 1990. The result was a victory for the National Democratic Congress, which won seven of the 15 seats. Voter turnout was 68%.

== Results ==
Party	Votes	%	Seats	+/–
National Democratic Congress	13,637	34.55	7	New
Grenada United Labour Party	11,105	28.13	4	+3
New National Party	6,916	17.52	2	–12
The National Party	6,854	17.36	2	New
Maurice Bishop Patriotic Movement	938	2.38	0	0
Good Old Democratic Party	6	0.02	0	New
Independents	15	0.04	0	0
Total	39,471	100.00	15	0
Valid votes	39,471	98.83		
Invalid/blank votes	468	1.17		
Total votes	39,939	100.00		
Registered voters/turnout	58,374	68.42		
Source: Nohlen
