= Sonika (given name) =

Sonika is a feminine given name.

== Notable people with this name ==
- Sonika Chauhan (1989–2017), Indian model, actor and TV host
- Sonika Kaliraman (born 1983), Indian wrestler
- Sonika Manandhar (born 1990), Nepali engineer and entrepreneur
- Sonika Mckie (born 1988), Grenadian singer-songwriter, known by the stage name Sonika
- Sonika Nirwal (born 1977), English politician
- Sonika Tandi (born 1997), Indian field hockey player
- Sonika Vaid (born 1995), American singer

=== Other spellings ===
- Sonequa Martin-Green (born 1985), American actress

== Fictional characters ==
- Sonika (software), a female vocal released for the Vocaloid 2 software by Zero-G Ltd
