= Marie Rose Cavelan =

Grenadian planter and revolutionary

- Born: c. 1752; Le Grenade, French West Indies, French Empire
- Other names: Marie Rose Fédon
- Occupations: planter, revolutionary

Marie Rose Cavelan (c. 1752 – fl. 1795) was an Afro-Grenadian planter and revolutionary. A free woman of color, she married Julien Fédon, a French Catholic, like herself of mixed ancestry. Together, she and her husband bought a plantation and engaged as planters and slave owners in the colonial period.

Grenada alternated between French and British rule several times during the couple's life, causing persecution for the couple when the British were in authority. Cavelan was arrested in 1787 and forced to provide evidence of her free status, although she was well known to the British, having conducted numerous business transactions with British business men. Although large landowners, Cavelan and her husband were increasingly denied the right to engage in public affairs. In the 1790s they began manumitting their slaves and in 1795 staged a revolt against British rule. Branded traitors, they led a revolt which lasted nearly two years, but were never captured by the British. Cavelan's whereabouts after the rebellion ended are unknown.

== Early life ==
Marie Rose Cavelan was born around 1752 in the French colony, Le Grenade (Note: Candlin & Pybus state that Cavelan was born on Martinique and that her father was a Frenchman. However, Jacobs states that Marguerite Cavelan, Marie Rose's sister, and their mother were natives of Grenada and that their father was a native of Martinique. If Michel Cavelan traveled with the French jeweler, Pierre Fédon and his Martiniquan wife, Brigitte Veuve to Grenada in 1749, it seems likely that Marie Rose was born in Grenada.) to Marianne Lemico and Michel Cavelan. Her father had immigrated from Martinique and moved to Le Grenade around 1750. Her mother was originally from the Sainte Rose Parish of Le Grenade. Documents of her heritage are conflicting, as some refer to her as a mulatresse libre, free mulatto woman and others show her to be femme mestive, a woman of mixed Amerindian and mulatta descent.

At the end of the Seven Years' War in 1763, the French ceded La Grenade to the British. The British regime allowed free persons of colour to own land and weapons, marry, and exercise free movement, all of which had been restricted under the French governors. During this volatile time, three of the Cavelan sisters, Elizabeth, Marguerite and Marie Rose, would marry brothers of the Fédon family. In 1774, Cavelan married Julien Fédon in an English ceremony, as the British forbade them a Catholic ceremony. In 1779, the French recaptured Grenada, and the following year, the couple remarried under French authorities on 31 January 1780 in a Catholic ceremony. Later, they had a daughter born in December of that year.

== Lead up to revolt ==
In 1784, the British regained control of Grenada, causing many French planters to relocate to Trinidad. Repressive laws passed by the British toward French Catholics, between 1784 and 1795, increasingly prevented free blacks from participating in the public affairs of the colony. Originally, the laws were aimed at curtailing French Catholic autonomy, but as the place the French planters had occupied was taken over by free people of colour, the laws began being applied to them as well. Cavelan and Fédon initially lived in Grand Pauvre (now Saint Mark Parish), where they ran a small plantation, known as Lancer. In February 1787, Cavelan was arrested under a law passed the previous year, which required her to show evidence of her status as a "free coloured" to the authorities in the capital, St. George's. She was well known to the authorities, as the owner of the plantation, Lancer, who had transacted business in her own name, and as the wife of Fédon. When the law was passed, she saw no reason to travel the fourteen miles from her home to the capital to register her free status, as the legal intent was ostensibly to curtail vagabonds.

The law supposedly applied to all free coloureds but was typically enforced only upon women, as a means of discouraging miscegenation and reinforcing white superiority. If Cavelan was unable to prove her free status within six weeks, the authorities were empowered to sell her into slavery. Fédon used his network, contacting Joseph Verdet, who had served as best man at their wedding and François Philip, who was a wealthy white planter, to vouch for her status. John Hay, the acting justice of the peace, accepted their oaths and released Cavelan after several weeks of incarceration, issuing her a certificate of freedom.

The French Revolution broke out in 1789, spawning revolts across the wider French Caribbean. In 1790, Fédon, along with thirty-five other Frenchmen, predominantly free coloured, signed a "Public Declaration of Loyalty", which professed that although French, their loyalty lay with Britain. That same year, Cavelan and Fédon relocated to Saint John Parish. Selling Lancer, which contained 38.5 acres of land and ten slaves for three thousand one hundred and fifty pounds (£3,150). They simultaneously bought the Belvidere Estate, a cacao and coffee plantation from James Campbell, "a Senior Member of the Council and former Acting Governor" of the colony. For the price of fifteen thousand pounds (£15,000), the purchase included 450 acres of land and the buildings, 16 cows, 5 horses, and 80 slaves. Beginning in 1790, the couple began to manumit the slaves that they owned, releasing Guillaume La Grange; Louis; and Mary Jeanne from Cabresse Island along with her children, Francois Louis, Edward and Rose in 1791. The acquisition of such a large estate, evidences that the couple had moved from nominally successful to part of the emerging free coloured elite.

The appointment of the ultra-Protestant planter, Ninian Home, as Lieutenant Governor in 1793, ensured that none of the colonists of French descent would be allowed to participate in the Legislative Assembly. The following year, the French National Convention abolished slavery and extended citizenship to all former slaves in all of the French colonies. The Convention sent out emissaries to make contact with those colonies, which had long-standing ties to France, to regain loyalties in the eastern Caribbean. By the time the agents reached Grenada, a revolt was already well-organized, with Fédon as the leader of the insurgents, which included free coloureds, slaves and maroons. The French agents offered to provide military assistance and guidance, which included the use of Jacobin terror tactics.

== Rebellion ==
Fédon's rebellion started at the beginning of March 1795. Taking the British by surprise, the rebels quickly captured Governor Home on 2 March and within two days had forty-three prisoners secured at Belvidere. Cavelan was as deeply invested as her husband in the revolt, as attested by eyewitness testimonies, which place both she and her daughters at the Battle of Mt. Qua-Qua. Fédon sent a demand for surrender to the British, who rejected the demands, instead promising amnesty to those who gave up the fight. Fédon was named in the September Act of Attainder which declared the insurgents traitors. The British officially extinguished the revolution on 19 June 1796 and thereafter the Fédon estates were confiscated. Rumors surfaced that Fédon had escaped to Cuba, but record of Cavelan after 8 April 1795 has not been found.
