= The National Party =

Political party in Grenada

The National Party (TNP) was a political party in Grenada.

== History ==
The party was established in July 1989 by Prime Minister Herbert Blaize, as a breakaway from the New National Party. It held its first conference on 17 December 1989, at which Blaize was officially elected party leader. However, following the death of Blaize two days later, Ben Jones became party leader and Prime Minister.

It won two seats in the 1990 elections and was part of Nicholas Brathwaite's coalition government. However, its share of the vote was more than halved in the 1995 elections and it lost both seats. The party did not contest any further elections.
