= Gloria Ann Thomas =

Gloria Ann Thomas is a Grenadian politician from the National Democratic Congress. She is a member of the Senate of Grenada.

== Career ==
In the 2022 Grenadian general election, Thomas was an unsuccessful candidate in the St. Andrew’s North-West constituency.

She formerly served as Minister of State with responsibility for Social Development and Gender Affairs.

In January 2024, she was appointed Minister for Social and Community Development, Housing and Gender Affairs in the Cabinet of Grenada.
