= Timothy Antoine =

Central banker

Governor of the Eastern Caribbean Central Bank
- Incumbent
- Assumed office 1 February 2016
- Deputy: Trevor Brathwaite (until 2021); Valda Henry (2021 - present)
- Preceded by: K. Dwight Venner

Personal details
- Born: Timothy Antoine Grenada
- Education: University of the West Indies (BSc.); London School of Economics (MSc.)

Timothy Antoine is the governor of the Eastern Caribbean Central Bank, and has served in the role since 2016, succeeding K. Dwight Venner.
