= Valda Henry =

Central banker

Dr Valda Henry

Deputy Governor of the Eastern Caribbean Central Bank
- Incumbent
- Assumed office September 2021
- Governor: Timothy Antoine
- Preceded by: Trevor Brathwaite

Valda Henry is a central banker from Dominica that currently serves as the Deputy Governor of the Eastern Caribbean Central Bank (ECCB).

== Career ==
From 1994 until 1998, Henry worked as a Senior Investment Officer at the Eastern Caribbean Central Bank (ECCB). In 2005, she founded her own HR consulting business, VF Consulting Inc.

In July 2021, she was announced as the third Deputy Governor of the ECCB, becoming the first woman to ever hold this position. She officially assumed her duties in September 2021.

== Education ==
Henry holds two undergraduate degrees in Management and Law, a master's degree in Business Administration, and a PhD in Industrial Relations and Business. She also has accreditation as a Chartered Financial Analyst and a Certified Global Professional in Human Resources.
