= David Emanuel =

David Emanuel may refer to:

- David Emanuel (fashion designer) (born 1952), Welsh fashion designer
- David Emanuel (politician) (1744–1808)

== See also ==
- David Emmanuel (disambiguation)
