= Leader of the Opposition (Grenada) =

Leader of His Majesty's Opposition
- Incumbent; Adrian Joseph since 17 November 2026
- Style: The Honourable
- Appointer: Governor-General
- Term length: While leader of the largest political party in the House of Representatives that is not in government
- Inaugural holder: Herbert Blaize
- Formation: February 7, 1974

The Leader of the Opposition (officially the Leader of His Majesty's Opposition) is usually the leader of the largest political party in the House of Representatives of Grenada that is not in government. The Leader of the Opposition is appointed by Governor-General of Grenada.

== Appointment ==
The appointment of the Leader of the Opposition is, under the constitution, a prerogative of the Governor-General. Whenever the occasion to appoint a leader of the opposition arises, the Governor-general must appoint the member of the House of Representatives who, in their opinion, is most likely to be supported by the largest bloc of House members who oppose the government.

The Governor-General is entitled to dismiss the opposition leader from office if it appears that they can no longer gather the support of the largest group of members of the House who are in opposition to the Government.

== Role ==
The Leader of the Opposition, as usually leader of the party not in government, is traditionally seen as the alternative prime minister of Grenada, leading the political opposition to the government and providing an alternative.

Under the constitution the Leader of the Opposition additionally has a set of defined responsibilities:

- To advise the Governor-General in the appointment of three senators in the Senate of Grenada.
- To advise the Governor-General in the appointment of two members of the Constituency Boundary Commission.

== Leaders of the Opposition ==
Name	Took office	Left office	Notes
Herbert Blaize	1974	1976	
Maurice Bishop	1976	1979	
Marcel Peters	1984	1987	
Phinsley St. Louis	1987	1987	
George Brizan	1987	1990	
Winnifred Strachan	1990	1995	First woman leader of the opposition
George Brizan	1995	1999	
Michael Baptiste	2000	2003	
Tillman Thomas	2004	2008	
Keith Mitchell	2008	2013	
Vacant	2013	2020	
Tobias Clement	2020	2022	
Keith Mitchell	2022	2025	
Emmalin Pierre	2025	2026	
Adrian Joseph	2026	Incumbent	

== See also ==
- Politics of Grenada
- Governor-General of Grenada
- Prime Minister of Grenada
