= Democratic People's Movement (Grenada) =

- Abbreviation: DPM
- Leader: Peter David
- Chairperson: Alister Bain
- Founded: 18 November 2025
- Split from: New National Party
- Headquarters: Lucas Street, St. George's
- Political position: Left-wing
- Colours: Orange
- Slogan: "Together We Move"
- House of Representatives: 0 / 15
- Senate: 0 / 13

Website
- dpmgd.org

The Democratic People's Movement (DPM), fully the Democratic People's Movement of Grenada, Carriacou and Petite Martinique, is a political party in Grenada. It is led and was founded by former government minister Peter David, following his failure to secure the leadership of the New National Party.

The platform of the DPM during the 2026 election campaign included:

- Grants of $35,000 for first-time homebuyers and $50,000 for couples
- Investments for economic development in the North of the country
- Increased subsidies for buses and transport
- Increased funding for education at all levels
- Guaranteed pricing for farmers
- Expanded healthcare access and funding
- The establishment of "Citizen Councils" to hold MPs accountable
- The establishment of a "Diaspora Engagement Plan" to give voices to Grenadians abroad

The party received 1,189 votes or 1.94% of the vote, landing in third place and received 0 elected seats to the legislature.

== Election results ==
=== House of Representatives elections ===
Election	Party leader	Votes	%	Seats	+/–	Position	Result
2026	Peter David	1,186	1.93%	0 / 15	New	▲3rd	Extra-parliamentary
