= Cabinet of Grenada =

The Cabinet of Grenada is appointed by the governor-general of Grenada on the advice of the prime minister of Grenada.

== Ministers ==
The current ministers have been serving since 1 July 2022:

- Dickon Thomas Mitchell – Prime Minister and Minister of Finance, National Security, Home Affairs and Public Administration, Information and Disaster Management
- Claudette Joseph – Attorney General and Minister of Legal Affairs, Labour and Consumer Affairs
- Joseph Andall – Minister of Foreign Affairs, Trade and Export Development
- Teven Andrews – Minister of Carriacou, Petite Martinique and Local Government
- Dennis Cornwall – Minister of Infrastructure and Physical Development, Civil Aviation and Transportation
- Kerryne James – Minister of Climate Resilience, Environment and Renewable Energy.
- Phillip Alfred Telesford – Minister of Social and Community Development, Housing and Gender Affairs
- Andy Williams – Minister of Mobilisation, Implementation and Transformation
- Lennox John Andrews – Minister of Economic Development, Agriculture, Planning, Blue Economy, Creative Economy, Tourism and ICT
- Senator David Evlyn Andrews – Minister of Education, Youth and Sports Affairs
- Gayton Jonathan LaCrette – Minister of Health, Wellness and Religious Affairs
- Senator Gloria Ann Thomas – Minister of State in the Ministry of Social Affairs, Housing and Gender Affairs
- Ron Livingston Redhead- Minister of State in the Ministry of Education, Youth Affairs and Sports
- Senator Adrian Augustine Thomas – Minister of State in the Ministry of Agriculture, Fisheries and Cooperatives.
