= People's National Party (Grenada) =

People's National Party of Grenada, Carriacou and Petite Martinique
- Abbreviation: PNP
- Leader: Jonathan La Crette
- Governing body: National Delegates Convention
- Founded: 1 June 2025
- Split from: National Democratic Congress
- Headquarters: St. George's
- Youth wing: National Youth Assembly
- Ideology: Conservatism; Liberal conservatism Christian democracy
- Political position: Centre-right
- Colours: Yellow; Red; Green
- Slogan: "A Grenada for Grenadians"
- House of Representatives: 0 / 15
- Senate: 0 / 13

Website
- pnpgrenada.com

The People's National Party (PNP), is a conservative and Christian democratic political party in Grenada. It is led and was founded by former health minister Jonathan La Crette. The party was founded as a split from the governing National Democratic Congress in June 2025, a year after La Crette was dismissed as Minister of Health from the government of Dickon Mitchell and from the Senate.

== Election results ==
=== House of Representatives elections ===
Election	Party leader	Votes	%	Seats	+/–	Position	Result
2026	Jonathan La Crette	69	0.11%	0 / 15	New	▲4th	Extra-parliamentary
