= Oliver Joseph =

Grenadian politician

Minister of Foreign Affairs of Grenada
- In office 19 September 2020 – 24 June 2022
- Preceded by: Peter David
- Succeeded by: Joseph Andall

Member of Parliament for St. David
- In office 27 March 2013 – 16 May 2022
- Succeeded by: Dickon Mitchell

Oliver Joseph is a Grenadian politician from the New National Party who served in the Cabinet of Grenada as Minister of Foreign Affairs from 2020 to 2022.
