= Winnifred Strachan =

Leader of the Opposition of Grenada
- In office April 1990 – June 1995
- Preceded by: George Brizan
- Succeeded by: George Brizan

Personal details
- Born: 8 September 1930
- Died: March 2007 (aged 76)
- Party: Grenada United Labour Party

Winnifred Strachan was a politician from Grenada and first female Leader of the Opposition of Grenada.

Strachan was born on 8 September 1930. She worked as a teacher. She was a member of Grenada United Labour Party (GULP), and run unsuccessfully in the 1984 elections. She run successfully in the 1990 elections, and won the parliamentary seat for Saint Andrew South East constituency. She served until 1995. She served as the Leader of the Opposition of Grenada from April 1990 to June 1995.

She died in March 2007.
