= Minister of Foreign Affairs (Grenada) =

This is a list of foreign ministers of Grenada.

- 1979–1981: Maurice Bishop
- 1981–1983: Unison Whiteman
- 1983–1984: Patrick Emmanuel
- 1984–1990: Ben Jones
- 1990: Nicholas Brathwaite
- 1990–1991: Ben Jones
- 1991–1992: Nicholas Brathwaite
- 1992: Denis Noel
- 1992–1995: Nicholas Brathwaite
- 1995: Denis Noel
- 1995–1997: Keith Mitchell
- 1997–1998: Raphael Fletcher
- 1998–1999: R. Mark Isaac
- 1999: Keith Mitchell
- 1999–2000: R. Mark Isaac
- 2000–2008: Elvin Nimrod
- 2008–2010: Peter David
- 2010–2012: Karl Hood
- 2012–2013: Tillman Thomas
- 2013–2014: Nickolas Steele
- 2014–2016: Clarice Modeste-Curwen
- 2016–2018: Elvin Nimrod
- 2018–2020: Peter David
- 2020–2022: Oliver Joseph
- 2022–2026: Joseph Andall
- 2026–present: Tarlie Francis

== Sources ==
- Rulers.org – Foreign ministers E–K
