= Karl Hood =

Grenadian politician

Ignatius Joachim Karl Hood
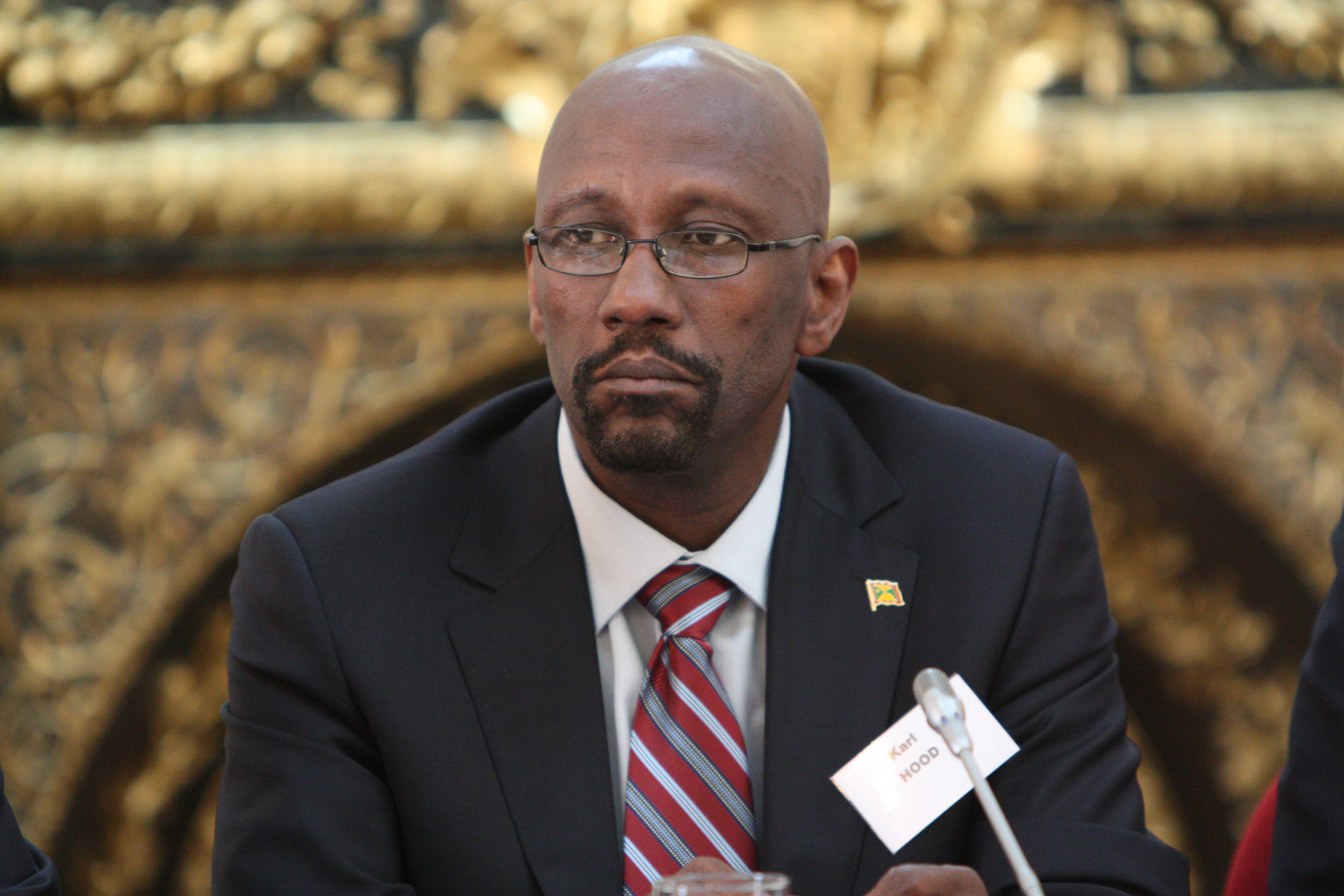

High Commissioner of Grenada to the United Kingdom
- Incumbent
- Assumed office 8 January 2016
- Prime Minister: Keith Mitchell
- Preceded by: Joslyn Whiteman

Ambassador of Grenada to China
- In office April 27, 2013 – 8 January 2016
- Prime Minister: Keith Mitchell
- Preceded by: Joslyn Whiteman
- Succeeded by: Denis Godwin Antoine

Minister of Foreign Affairs
- In office 26 November 2010 – 18 May 2012
- Prime Minister: Tillman Thomas
- Preceded by: Peter David
- Succeeded by: Tillman Thomas

Minister of Labour, Social Security and Ecclesiastical Affairs
- In office July 9, 2008, 2008 – 26 November 2010
- Prime Minister: Tillman Thomas
- Succeeded by: Glynis Roberts

Member of Parliament for St. George South-East
- In office 8 July 2008 – 13 February 2013
- Preceded by: Gregory Bowen
- Succeeded by: Gregory Bowen

Personal details
- Born: Happy Hill, Saint George, Grenada
- Party: National Democratic Congress (before 2013) New National Party (2013-present)
- Education: West Indies School of Theology; Nyack College; Newport University
- Occupation: Religious leader Optician politician

Ignatius Joachim Karl Hood, known as Karl Hood, is a politician from the island nation of Grenada. He served as an MP, Minister of Labour, Social Security and Ecclesiastical Affairs (2008–2010) and as Minister of Foreign Affairs (2010–2012) in a government led by former prime minister Tillman Thomas. He resigned as Minister of Foreign Affairs on 18 May 2012 after he abstained from a no-confidence vote against the government two days earlier. He currently serves as Grenada's High Commissioner to the United Kingdom.
