= Hoskins Huggins =

(Arthur) Hoskins Huggins, CMG (died 28 October 2016) was an Anglican priest in the second half of the twentieth century and the first decades of the 21st.

He was educated at Codrington College, Barbados; and ordained in 1958. After curacies in Grenada he held incumbencies at Holy Trinity, Georgetown and St Patrick, Grenada. He was Dean of St. George’s Cathedral, Kingstown St Vincent from 1970 to 1973 when he became Archdeacon of Grenada and Vicar general of the Diocese of the Windward Islands. After this he held further incumbencies at St. George’s, Tortola and St. Paul’s, Frederiksted. In 2008 a service was held to celebrate his fifty years of ordained ministry.
