= Monica Joseph =

Dame Monica Theresa Joseph (10 January 1934 - 6 July 2023) was a Grenadian judge and public servant.

== Early life and career ==
Joseph was born in Grenada on 10 January 1934. Prior to entering law, Joseph worked for ten years in a number of civil service departments until 1963, when she was granted study leave and went to the United Kingdom to study law.

== Legal career ==
In November 1966, Joseph was called to the bar at Lincoln's Inn. She then worked in the Grenadian Ministry of External Affairs. In 1972, she moved to Saint Vincent and the Grenadines and entered its Public Legal Service, working as a legal assistant, crown counsel, senior crown counsel, and then Solicitor General and Director of Public Prosecutions until 1982.

=== Eastern Caribbean Supreme Court ===
In 1982, Joseph was appointed as a judge of the Organisation of Eastern Caribbean States supreme court, the Eastern Caribbean Supreme Court (ECSC), becoming the first woman to sit on the bench of the ECSC. She then served as the first resident judge of the British Virgin Island and Anguilla, and later became resident judge of Saint Vincent and the Grenadines. In 1991, she became a justice of appeal for a year and then served a number of temporary stints on the ECSC court of appeal, and was the first woman to sit on the ECSC court of appeal. She retired from the ECSC in 1996.

In 2008, she returned to the ECSC, serving as a High Court Judge for Saint Vincent and the Grenadines until 2012.

== Post-legal career achievements ==
Following her retirement in 1996, Joseph was appointed Deputy to the Governor-General of Grenada under the New National Party government, meaning she served as acting governor-general a number of times. She also served as Chair of the Grenada Public Service Commission, and was involved with various charitable organisations.

== Personal life ==
Joseph, a Roman Catholic, died on 6 July 2023, aged 89.

== Awards ==
- Commander of the Most Excellent Order of the British Empire (CBE), 1997
- Dame Commander of the Most Excellent Order of the British Empire (DBE), 2013
