= Peter David (politician) =

Grenadian politician

The Honourable Charles Peter David MP
- David in 2018

Leader of the Democratic People's Movement
- Incumbent
- Assumed office 18 November 2025

Member of Parliament for Town of St George
- In office 14 March 2018 – 2 October 2026
- Preceded by: Nicholas Steele
- Succeeded by: Claudette Joseph
- Majority: 211 (8.62%)
- In office 28 November 2003 – 19 February 2013
- Preceded by: Brenda Hood
- Succeeded by: Nicholas Steele

Minister of Foreign Affairs
- In office 25 March 2018 – 19 September 2020
- Prime Minister: Keith Mitchell
- Preceded by: Elvin Nimrod
- Succeeded by: Oliver Joseph
- In office 13 July 2008 – 26 November 2010
- Prime Minister: Tillman Thomas

Minister of Tourism, Civil Aviation & Culture
- In office 26 November 2010 – 30 April 2012
- Prime Minister: Tillman Thomas

Deputy Secretary of Information for the People's Revolutionary Government
- In office 1979–1983
- Prime Minister: Maurice Bishop

Personal details
- Born: 1957 (age 68–69) Saint George, Grenada
- Party: Democratic People's Movement (2025–present)
- Other political affiliations: Independent (2012–2014); New National Party (2014–2025); National Democratic Congress (1999-2012); New Jewel Movement (1979-1983)
- Education: Essex University
- Occupation: Attorney at Law politician

Charles Peter David (born 1957) is a Grenadian politician. He is a member of the House of Representatives from the Town of Saint George's constituency, and served as Minister of Foreign Affairs from July 2008 to November 2010. He subsequently served as Minister of Tourism until he resigned from the Cabinet on April 30, 2012.

== Political career ==
During the People's Revolutionary Government under Maurice Bishop, David was a member of the New Jewel Movement and served as the Deputy Secretary of Information and as a Captain in the People's Revolutionary Army.

David joined the National Democratic Congress (NDC) in 1999. He was elected to the House of Representatives from the Town of St. George in the November 2003 general election. The New National Party (NNP), the governing party, repeatedly went to court in attempts to prevent David from serving in Parliament, arguing that he is a citizen of Canada and thus ineligible, but these legal efforts by the NNP were rejected.

In the general election held on July 8, 2008, David was re-elected from the Town of St. George. The NDC won a majority of seats in this election, and David became Minister of Tourism and Foreign Affairs in the new NDC Cabinet, led by Prime Minister Tillman Thomas, which was sworn in on July 13.

David later joined the New National Party (NNP), becoming a government senator following that party's landslide victory in the 2013 general election. After the NNP won another landslide victory in the 2018 election, David was appointed Minister of Foreign Affairs. Following a cabinet reshuffle two years later, his portfolio switched to Minister for Agriculture and Labour., a position he held until NNP's loss at the polls in June 2022. David made an unsuccessful run to become the new leader of the New National Party with the retirement in 2024 of long-term leader Keith Mitchell. David withdrew from the race a day before the party's convention, accusing the process of having been rigged against him. He resigned from the New National Party and became an independent MP on 20 January 2025. On 18 November 2025, David founded the Democratic People's Movement (DPM).
