= Nazim Burke =

Grenadian politician

The Honourable Nazim Burke
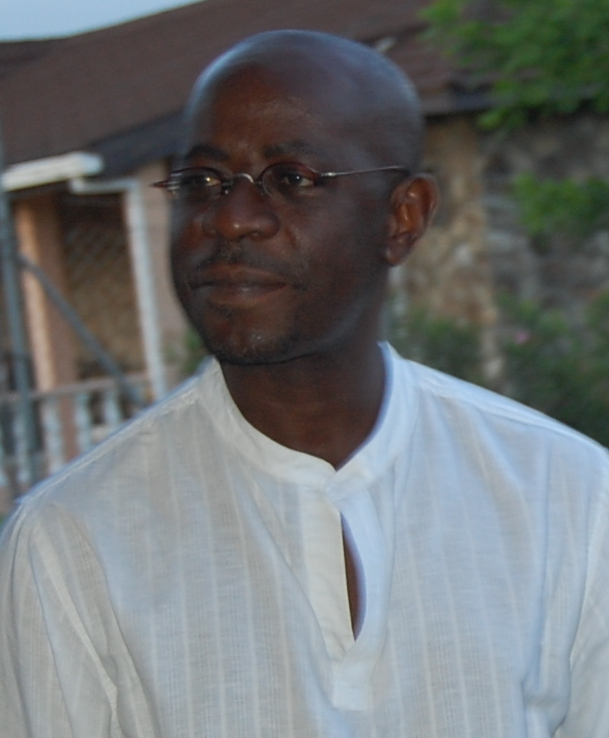
- Burke in 2011

Leader of the National Democratic Congress
- In office 2 February 2014 – 1 July 2018
- Preceded by: Tillman Thomas
- Succeeded by: Joseph Andall (acting)

National Democratic Congress Senator for the House of Senate
- In office 27 March 2013 – 29 January 2018

Minister of Finance
- In office 9 July 2008 – 19 February 2013
- Prime Minister: Tillman Thomas
- Preceded by: Keith Mitchell
- Succeeded by: Keith Mitchell

Personal details
- Born: 18 September 1956 Belair, Carriacou, Grenada
- Party: National Democratic Congress
- Education: Concordia University; University of Windsor

Nazim Burke (né Victor Gordon Burk, born September 1956) is a Grenadian politician from the island of Carriacou, Grenada. He was born in Belair, Carriacou.

== Finance ministry ==
He served as the nation's Minister of Finance, Planning, Economic Development, Energy and Foreign Trade during the premiership of Tillman Thomas, from 2008 to 2013, headed by Tillman Thomas.

== NDC leadership ==
He was elected as the political leader of the NDC at a party convention in early 2014 after Thomas stepped aside following the loss at the 2013 elections. Burke himself resigned as party leader in July 2018 following his party's disastrous election results in that year's election in which the party failed to gain any seats leaving it out of the House of Representatives for a third time. He was succeeded by his deputy, Joseph Andall as acting leader, pending a new leadership election due no later than March 2019.

Political offices
Preceded by Keith Mitchell	Minister of Finance of Grenada; 2008 – 2013	Succeeded by Keith Mitchell
