= Alleyne Walker =

Grenada politician

Alleyne Walker is a politician from Grenada. He was educated at St. Andrew Anglican Secondary School. He made part of the National Democratic Congress, and in 2018, he served as Grenada's Minister of Housing, Lands and Community Development.
