= Brother Valentino =

Grenadian-born Trinidadian Calypsonian (1941–2026)

- Memorial card from the Trinidad Guardian
- Born: 7 July 1941; Cherry Hill, Grenada, British Windward Islands
- Died: 20 October 2026 (aged 85); Trinidad and Tobago
- Occupation: Calypsonian
- Years active: 1961–2026
- Notable work: Stay up Zimbabwe (1979) Ah Wo (1980)

Emrold Anthony Philip (7 July 1941 – 20 October 2026), known by his stage name Brother Valentino, was a Grenadian-born Trinidadian Calypsonian and Soca musician.

== Early life ==
Emrold Anthony Philip was born in Cherry Hill, Grenada on the 7 July 1941. He migrated to Trinidad at a young age, arriving on Jouvé (Carnival) morning which helped influence him and 'foretold' his entry into Calypso. As a child, Calypso was a large part of his life, with his parents listening to Lord Beginner, Lord Christo, Lord Kitchener. His education was interrupted by his father's death when Philip was 16 and during that time Philip tried several jobs before being inspired to become a Calypsonian in 1961, after hearing Calypso on the radio at his tailoring job, becoming a professional in 1966. He was inspired by fellow Grenadian‐Trinidadian Calypsonian Mighty Sparrow. He was given the name Valentino by Lord Kitchener after arriving at his caravan tent without a stagename.

== Calypso career ==
Valentino sang about various political subjects such as the Black Power movement as well as poverty, inequality and political authority. He toured the USA in the mid-1970s and sang with another politically vocal calypsonian called Black Stalin, with one of his famous songs called 'Stay up Zimbabwe' being an Anti-Apartheid song against the state of Rhodesia, written in 1979. He later toured in Grenada, the UK and Cuba. He also wrote the 1980 song 'Ah Wo [Brand new revolution]', one of his most successful songs. In later life he received the Sunshine Award, for 50 years as a performing artist, as well as the Hummingbird Medal in 2012. In 2005 he won the Veterans Calpyso Monarch competition with the song 'Where Kaiso went'. During his career he was called 'The People's Calypsonian'.

== Death ==
Valentino died on 20 October 2026, at the age of 85.
