= Michael Church =

Grenadian politician

Michael Church is a Grenadian politician. He was the Minister of Trade and the Environment.

He was demoted in November 2010 after a trip to Italy. He resigned after he boycotted his own swearing-in ceremony.
