= Glynis Roberts =

Grenadian politician

The Honourable Glynis Roberts MP

Political Leader, National United Front

Member of Parliament for St George South
- Incumbent
- Assumed office 2003
- Preceded by: Ann David-Antoine
- Majority: 3,268 (55%)

Personal details
- Born: 5 August 1961 (age 64) St David, Grenada
- Party: National United Front
- Spouse: Terry Roberts (deceased)
- Occupation: Politician

Glynis Roberts (born 5 August 1961) is a politician from the tri-island nation of Grenada, Carriacou and Petite Martinique. She is the Political Leader of the National United Front and the first female leader of a political party in Grenada. She was first elected to parliament in 2003 and represents the St George South constituency for the National Democratic Congress (NDC) in the House of Representatives of Grenada. The House of Representatives is the lower house of the Parliament of Grenada. It has 15 members, elected for a five-year term in single-seat constituencies.

The St George South constituency, based in the southernmost part of Grenada, covers the communities of Calliste, True Blue, L'Anse aux Épines, Frequente, Grand Anse, Grand Anse Valley, Woburn, Springs and Belmont. It also takes in the Maurice Bishop International Airport in Point Salines, the world-famous Grand Anse beach and St. George's University. Most of Grenada's major hotels are concentrated in the district.

Roberts was born in the rural parish of St David.

As a minister of government, she managed to maintain a modest popularity and enjoyed good relations with both labour leaders and the island's hoteliers. Roberts has been an outspoken critic of domestic violence and a strong advocate of families and children. She was also chair of the Mercy Committee that oversaw the recent release from prison of former deputy prime minister Bernard Coard and six other men for their involvement in the death of the late prime minister Maurice Bishop in 1983.
