= Sonika =

Grenadian singer-songwriter

- Born: Sonika Jermina Mckie; October 21, 1988 (age 37); St. George's, Grenada
- Occupation: Singer-songwriter
- Years active: 2011–present
- Style: R&B, soul, pop, dance
- Children: Akia (2008– )

Sonika Keturah Jermina Mckie (born October 21, 1988), known simply as Sonika, is a Grenadian singer-songwriter and recording artist based in the Eastern Caribbean island of Grenada.

Born in St. George's, Grenada, her professional career began when she was approached by the Manager of Metronome Records, Nima Anvar, who had seen her performance on May 29, 2010, at the Grenada Best Talent Competition Final. Shortly after this, Anvar offered Sonika an opportunity to be managed by him and to develop her career. During 2011, Sonika accepted the offer.

Under Anvar's management, Sonika was introduced to an organized method for approaching her development as a serious artist. In the process, Anvar pulled in a team of persons to develop Sonika into an international artist.

Team members at the inception included local talk show host of Chit Chat and media personality, Lexan Fletcher, who assisted as an image consultant; Annette Moore, who advised on social media strategies and development; Hervin Hood, a Full Sail University Music & Entertainment Business alum, Anvar's then co-partner at Metronome Records who dealt with studio recording, assisted by Joshua "J-Beatz" Benjamin, a young sound engineer prodigy; Xpert Productions/Studio, which comprises John James and his brother Jason 'Xpert' James from the neighboring island of Carriacou; Sean "Fame" Nelson, a UK-based, Grenadian Music Producer; Samuel Ogilvie, who did the storyboarding for Sonika's music videos and who also assisted with the filming of videos and the video recording of several of her covers; Darryl Friday, a film school graduate, who filmed and edited Sonika's Gone Away music video, as well as other consultants, who assisted with image development and brand marketing.

In 2013, due to pressing responsibilities Anvar handed management over to artist development associate, Annette Moore, who, together with consultant, Mike Adams, continued Sonika's development. In 2015 Sonika and Moore parted ways, having also done so with Adams in 2013, when he migrated.

Corporate sponsors, including Smiths Grenada [Monica Smith]; Chalene's Beauty Salon & School of Cosmetology; Jus Fashion Grenada; Lima Es Photography [Salima Esmail]; Solana J. Boutique; Silhouette by Neisha LaTouche; Make-up Artist, Divya Armanani-Noel and others, all played a role in the image building and professional development of Sonika's career.

To date, Sonika has released five singles between April 2012 and September 2013; she has sung to audiences both locally and internationally; released a music video for her first single, "Gone Away", which went to No. 1 on Tempo Networks; is the first Grenadian artist to have a VEVO channel and recently filmed and is about to release a music video for "Please Don't Let It Go" (her second single).

== Career ==
Sonika wrote and recorded a Reggae single at the age of 16 in 2004, entering the studio for the very first time. The song "I Love You" was produced by Rodney "Piper" Bartholomew, a Grenadian producer. Sonika did not venture further into recording until 2010, when she wrote and recorded a Pop song, "Electrik", which was produced by Sandman in 2011 at his Aquarion Studios, featuring local rapper S God. Both of those songs remained local and were not positioned for release to the outside market. Sonika's first productions for international release were done with Metronome Records, when she began working with Anvar.

Sonika also entered several singing competitions, including the Digicel Rising Stars Competition and she represented Grenada in a regional Karaoke competition held in St. Kitts in 2006.

Sonika's original development pathway focused heavily on R&B. In 2011 she began vocal coaching with an experienced classical, vocal coach in Grenada, Mrs. Valerie Daniel-Burkhardt, mother of former 2007 Ms. World semi-finalist Vivian Burkhardt. However, in 2012 Sonika moved on to seeking genre-specific coaching for R&B from a Los Angeles-based, Christian Rock artist and vocal coach, Ken Tamplin, thereby strengthening and defining her vocal range. Between 2011 and 2012 Sonika became immersed in writing her own songs, recording, taking music theory courses, doing regular vocal practice sessions, performing both her original music and covering popular artists, on a regular basis at various events, on the local circuit.

During 2012 all of Sonika's preparation and work started coming together with the release of her first original song, the self-penned R&B track "Gone Away". Shortly after the song's release on iTunes, it was on heavy rotation on the Caribbean SuperStation and local radio stations. Sonika did several interviews on TV and radio and plans were made for the conceptualization and storyboarding of the music video for "Gone Away". On August 27, 2012, the video was released on YouTube and was featured on Tempo Networks, where it climbed to number one on the charts and remained there for eight consecutive weeks. Shortly after, on September 10, 2012, Sonika became the first Grenadian to have access to a VEVO channel and her music video was then posted on that medium, having been previously released on Metronome Records’ YouTube channel. At that point, Sonika continued to work to release her second self-penned song, "Please Don't Let It Go".

"Please Don't Let It Go" was released in July 2012. Nineteen year old 2011 400m World Champion, Kirani James, an athlete from the western side of Grenada, was about to compete in the 2012 London Olympics. Everyone believed that Kirani would win the 400m final race and he did, on August 6, breaking a national record and becoming the first Grenadian to ever win an Olympic medal and the first Grenadian to win an Olympic Gold Medal. The country erupted into a state of festivity and there was a strong resurgence of National Pride. During the Olympics, the Grenada Broadcasting Network introduced the freshly released "Please Don't Let It Go", as the theme song for the Olympics, due to the nature of the lyrics, which focused on holding on to one's dreams. At the homecoming ceremony for Kirani James, in Grenada, Sonika performed "Please Don't Let It Go", before a crowd of several thousands, who had gathered to celebrate with the Olympic Champion at the Grenada National Stadium, in St. George's. It was her biggest audience thus far, as a performer. The rest of 2012 was marked by with requests for performances, featuring "Please Don't Let It Go", at many of local events. Consequently, that period became one of the most hectic and demanding periods for Sonika, in her still new career as a performer.

Between 2011 and 2012, Sonika established herself on the local and regional music scene as a talent to watch. Although continuing to write her original music, she also continued to do YouTube covers, with one particular cover gaining considerable attention – Alicia Keys’ "Brand New Me".

In 2013, Sonika got a referral from local head of the Grenada Football Association, Cheney Joseph, who, after hearing her original music and covers of popular artists, made a call to Enrique Sanz, General Secretary of the Confederation of North, Central American and Caribbean Association Football [CONCACAF].

What followed was that Sonika was asked to perform at a private gala event at the Modern Wing of the Chicago Art Institute in Chicago, Illinois, July 27, 2012 – the day before CONCACAF Gold Cup game. It was Sonika's first international performance. The only two acts to perform that night were Sonika and Leah LaBelle, a young female artist signed to Epic Records/So So Def Recordings.

Returning home in August 2013, Sonika was offered yet another opportunity to perform internationally. This led to her performing at CARIFESTA XI at the Caribbean Marketplace for the Arts, in Suriname on August 22, 2013, to an audience of nationals from CARICOM member and associate member states, as well as persons from other countries.

In September 2013 Sonika released three original songs – two self-penned and the other written for her by her now former manager, Anvar. The releases include one ballad, "Don't Let Me In" and two dance tracks, "All Falls Down" and "Only Girl", as Sonika moved more in the direction of R&B/pop.

== Artistry ==
=== Music and voice ===
Sonika's vocal range has been referred to by her vocal coach, Ken Tamplin, as being in the top fifth percentile of all of his students.

Sonika tends to write lyrics that are very self-reflective, particularly her R&B music. "Gone Away" reflected on her struggle to emerge unscathed from an emotionally damaging relationship, while "Please Don't Let It Go" focused on her overcoming negative influences and situations to achieve her dreams. Pop music, however, allows Sonika to explore her fun, daring side in songs such as "All Falls Down" and "Only Girl", which are bolder, exude more confidence and command attention. Sonika prefers that the songs she writes and/or performs reflect something meaningful about her and her life experience, tell a story or allow her to be expressive and immersed in the mood of the song.

=== Videos and stage ===
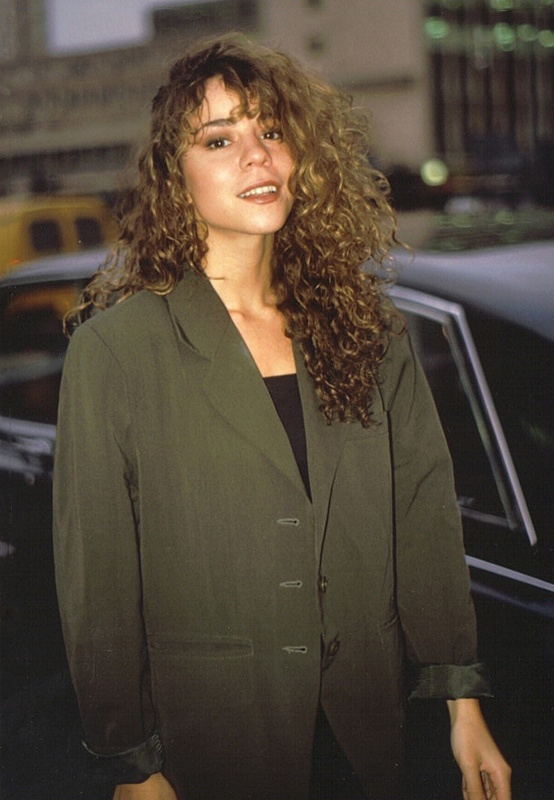
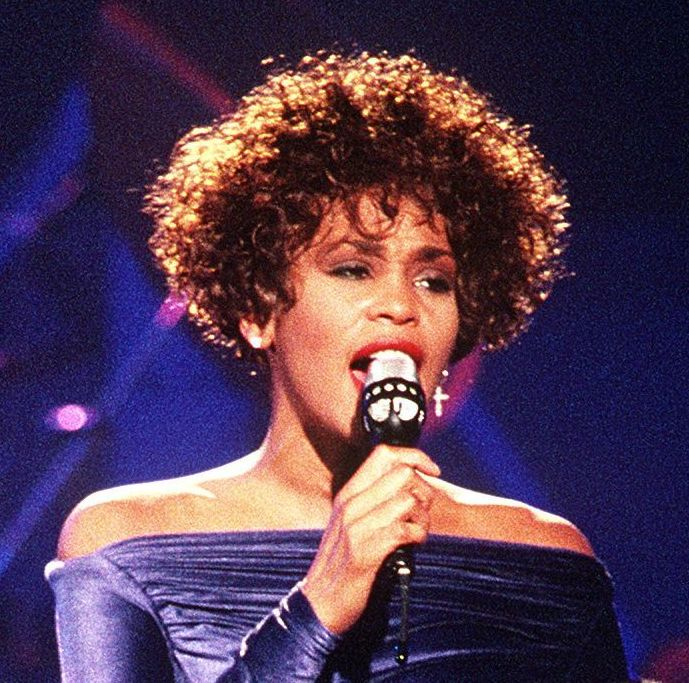
Mariah (left) and Whitney Houston (right) are two of Sonika's biggest influences.

Sonika has released one original video for her first single "Gone Away". The video concept was developed by Anvar and Samuel Ogilvie, who also did the storyboard. The videography on the video was done by Darryl Friday, assisted by Anvar and Ogilvie. Anvar custom built a makeshift dolly to get dolly-in (forward) and dolly-out (backward) shots, creating the first video in Grenada to employ the technique, which, due to lack of the proper equipment, hadn't been attempted before. The video was done on a zero budget with sponsors providing the wardrobe and other assistance. The project depended on such Corporate Sponsors as the owners of the Mt. Hartman Bay Estate, a high profile, private resort in Grenada, which is frequented by well-known actors and other celebrities.

The video for "Gone Away" was submitted to TEMPO and became popular on that network, allowing it to rise to and remain at number one for eight consecutive weeks, on the TEMPO Cross Caribbean Countdown Charts. No other Grenadian artist had previously achieved that, with Josh Berkeley (Josh Mathurine) being the only other Grenadian artist to reach number one on TEMPO, with the Metronome Records produced video for, his self-penned song, "Never Meant", from his first album, Ready for Whatever.

Sonika's second music video, for "Please Don't Let It Go", was conceptualized and storyboarded by Ogilvie and filmed by Ogilvie and Anvar. This video is in pre-release and is expected to be available in the last quarter of 2013.

Sonika's first appearance on stage came when she participated in and won Grenada's Talent Search in 2003, with her rendition of Whitney Houston's Run to You. Following that, Sonika participated in local and regional Karaoke and singing competitions. She also participated in the GBN Gospel Challenge in 2009 and the Grenada Best Talent Competition in June 2010. Since the release of "Please Don't Let it Go", Sonika has been a regularly booked local act, at events seeking popular artists.

Sonika had two international performances in 2013, first at the CONCACAF gala event in Chicago, Illinois, and shortly after, in Suriname for CARIFESTA XI.

=== Acting ===
In 2012 Sonika played the leading role of Belinda, in the Francis Urias Peters' play, Belinda. The play was performed at the Spice Basket in St. George's and other local venues.

=== Public image ===
Sonika's music has attracted a local and regional audience, and she is expanding her listener base internationally.

In re-defining her music, Sonika is also making changes in her personal style, but maintains an image that will allow her to command respect.

== Legacy and influence ==
In her 2012 interview with Converse Caribe, Sonika stated that it was not always an easy road to becoming confident in her ability and overcoming self-image insecurities, as a young woman. She believes that being around positive people, believing in oneself – no matter what – and working hard at achieving one's goals eventually pays off. Sonika therefore sees her story as a reference point for other young people and artists to draw on, in overcoming their struggles to develop personally and professionally.

== Personal life ==
Sonika was born to Judyann Mckie and Joseph Hurst on October 21, 1988, in the small village of Willis, New Hampshire, St. George's, where she grew up. She had a bittersweet childhood. While her memories of that time are full of fun and laughter, they were also marred by mean-spirited jibes and insults. Sonika was told ceaselessly that she was ugly and would always be ugly, even into her teenage years. The fact that she was often seen in Market Square helping her mother sell produce only gave her detractors more fuel to add to the fire. This did not do wonders for her self-esteem, and other strained relationships within the family placed an emotional burden on her.

At school she performed at her high school's (Wesley College) talent shows, and dabbled in sports as well, earning a Netball MVP award. It was also around this time that she left her mother's care to stay with her grandmother. In spite of having to deal with many changes, Sonika graduated from high school and enrolled in the T.A. Marryshow Community College's (TAMCC) secretarial program. In 2007, the same year that she had to move again, Sonika discovered that she was about to become a mom. At this time she was still attending TAMCC. She managed to graduate in 2008 with a 3.45 GPA, at the top of her class and have a healthy baby girl, whom she named Akia.

Shortly after Akia's birth, Akia's father left Grenada to pursue a military career in the United Kingdom, which led to another difficult period. Regardless, Sonika managed to move on.

Today Sonika is living on her own and raising her daughter, while pursuing her music career.

== Discography ==
=== Singles ===
- "Gone Away" – April 2012
- "Please Don't Let It Go" – July 2012
- "All Falls Down" – September 2013
- "Don't Let Me In" – September 2013
- "Only Girl" – September 2013
