= Michael D. Lett =

Grenadian politician (1938–2013)

Michael Denis Lett
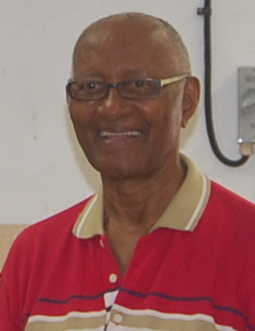
- Lett in 2012

Minister of Agriculture, Forestry and Fisheries of Grenada
- In office 2008–2013
- In office 2003–2013

Personal details
- Born: December 8, 1938
- Died: January 28, 2013 (aged 74)
- Occupation: Politician, land surveyor

Michael Denis Lett (December 8, 1938 – January 28, 2013) was a politician from the island of Grenada. He represented the constituency of Saint David in the lower house of the parliament from 2003 until his death, and since 2008 served as that nation's Minister of Agriculture, Forestry and Fisheries. He was also a Land Surveyor.

== Early life and career ==
Michael Denis Lett was born on December 8, 1938, and was the second of nine children. He attended Presentation Brothers' College.

Before entering politics, Lett worked as a licensed surveyor in the ministries of works and agriculture. After retiring from the public service, he established the surveying firm Lett & Partner, later managed by his son Ivor.

Lett was also active in community and religious organisations, including the Society of St. Vincent de Paul and the Catholic Men's League. Outside public life, he was involved in cricket and carnival masquerade bands led by Dennis "Away" Lindsay.

== Political career ==
According to the National Democratic Congress (NDC), Lett became known nationally for his role in defending public access to La Sagesse Beach in 1973.

Lett entered electoral politics ahead of the 2003 Grenadian general election after being persuaded to contest the St. David constituency for the National Democratic Congress. He won the seat in the election, although the NDC narrowly lost nationally.

He was re-elected in 2008, when the NDC won government, and was appointed Minister of Agriculture, Forestry and Fisheries. During his ministerial tenure, he also served as acting prime minister on several occasions.

Political colleagues described Lett as a moderate and conciliatory figure within the NDC.

== Personal life ==
Lett raised his 6 children after the death of his wife, Dawne Lett (née Sylvester).

== Death ==
Lett died in 2013 of prostate cancer at the age of 74. His funeral took place on February 4, 2013, at St. David's Roman Catholic Church, followed by entombment at the family cemetery in St. David.
