= Tevin Andrews =

Grenadian politician

Tevin Andrews is a Grenadian politician from the National Democratic Congress who has served in the Cabinet of Grenada as Minister for Carriacou and Petite Martinique Affairs and Local Government since 1 July 2022. He also represents Carriacou and Petite Martinique in the House of Representatives.
