= Ann David-Antoine =

Grenadian politician

Ann David-Antoine (born July 6, 1949) is a Grenadian politician, nurse, and midwife.

== Professional career ==
She was an appointed member of the Senate of Grenada from 2003 to 2008. She has served as the island's Minister of Health, Social Security, the Environment and Ecclesiastic Relations, and is a Justice of the Peace. David-Antoine is a member of the New National Party, and serves as well as a justice of the peace. She has lectured in health studies at Uxbridge College.
