= K. Dwight Venner =

Governor of the Eastern Caribbean Central Bank

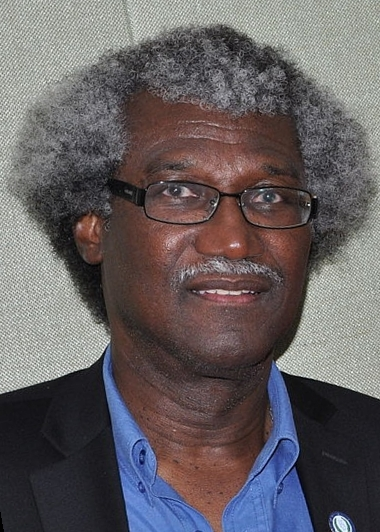
Venner on 23 May 2014

Sir Kenneth Dwight Vincent Venner, KBE, SLC (c. 1946 – 22 December 2016) was the governor of the Eastern Caribbean Central Bank, a position he held from December 1989 to November 2015. Prior to that, he served as the director of finance and planning in the St Lucian Government between November 1981 and November 1989.

He was educated at the University of the West Indies in Jamaica where he obtained both a Bachelor of Science (BSc) and a Master of Science (MSc) degree in economics. He served as a junior research fellow at the Institute of Social and Economic Research at the University of the West Indies and then as a lecturer in economics from 1974 to 1981.

In 1996 he was named a Commander of the Order of the British Empire (CBE), and in 2001 promoted to Knight Commander (KBE) in the same order. In 2012 he received the Saint Lucia Cross for outstanding contribution in economics and finance.

Venner was born in Kingstown, Saint Vincent. He was married to Lynda Arnolde Winville Venner née St. Rose.

== Retirement ==
In late 2015 Venner announced his retirement after 26 years of service in his position as Governor. He stepped down at the end of November 2015. Venner was the longest-serving governor of any central bank, monetary authority, or federal reserve, having served since 1989. As of January 8, 2016, the former Permanent Secretary in the Ministry of Finance in Grenada, Timothy Antoine, has been appointed as the new head of the ECCB.

Venner died at the age of 70 on 22 December 2016 at Tapion Hospital in St. Lucia.
