= Joseph Gilbert (politician) =

Joseph A. Gilbert is a former politician from Grenada. He served as that nation's Minister of Works, Physical Development, Public Utilities and Environment from 2008 to 2012.

Gilbert was a member of the House of Representatives of Grenada. The House of Representatives is the lower house of the Parliament of Grenada. It has 15 members, elected for a five-year term in single-seat constituencies. Gilbert was the National Democratic Congress Party member for the seat of Saint Patrick West.
