= Ben Jones (Grenadian politician) =

Grenadian politician (1924–2005)

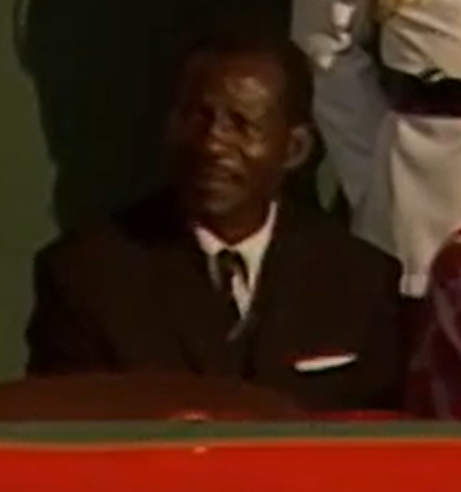

Prime Minister of Grenada
- In office 20 December 1989 – 16 March 1990
- Monarch: Elizabeth II
- Governor General: Paul Scoon
- Preceded by: Herbert Blaize
- Succeeded by: Nicholas Brathwaite

Personal details
- Born: 5 August 1924 Carriere, Saint Andrew Parish, Grenada
- Died: 10 February 2005 (aged 80) Carriere, Saint Andrew Parish, Grenada
- Party: New National Party; The National Party

Ben Joseph Jones (5 August 1924 – 10 February 2005) was a Grenadian politician. He was a lawyer before being elected to Parliament as a member of the New National Party in 1984. In 1984 he began serving as foreign minister in the government of his party's leader, Herbert Blaize. When Blaize died in December 1989, Jones became prime minister of Grenada. He served until March 1990, when his party lost elections. He also gave up his position as foreign minister at that time, but was reappointed later that year. Though his party was out of power, Jones continued serving as foreign minister until 1991.

== Biography ==
Jones was born in Carriere, Saint Andrew Parish, Grenada, and was educated at the Belair Presbyterian Primary School until 1943. During World War II he enlisted in the Windward Islands Battalion of the South Caribbean Force.

He subsequently worked in Aruba in the oil refineries for nine years, then in 1953 migrated to the United Kingdom, determined to study law. He eventually entered Gray's Inn and at the same time enrolled as an external student at the University of London. He was called to the Bar on 6 February 1962.

He returned to Grenada in 1964 to start a private law practice but the following year moved into government service as a magistrate. In 1966, he was appointed Senior Assistant Secretary in the Ministry of External Affairs and was appointed Opposition Senator from 1967 to 1979.

In 1984, he was elected to the House of Representatives of Grenada, winning the St. Andrew's South West constituency under the New National Party (NNP). He served in Legal Affairs as Attorney General, and as Minister of External Affairs, Agriculture and Tourism.

He was Deputy Prime Minister of Grenada from 1984 to 1989, and, following the death of Herbert Blaize, was a short-term Prime Minister from December 1989 until March 1990. He was finance minister simultaneously. He succeeded Blaize as the leader of the newly formed The National Party (TNP). He resumed his private practice in 1991.

Popularly known as "Uncle Ben", Jones died in his sleep at his home in Carriere, St. Andrew's, at the age of 80, and was given a state funeral.

Government offices
Preceded by Herbert Blaize	Prime Minister of Grenada; 9 December 1989 – 16 March 1990	Succeeded by Nicholas Brathwaite
Preceded by Herbert Blaize	Minister of Finance of Grenada; 1989 – 1990	Succeeded by George Brizan
