= David Emmanuel (musician) =

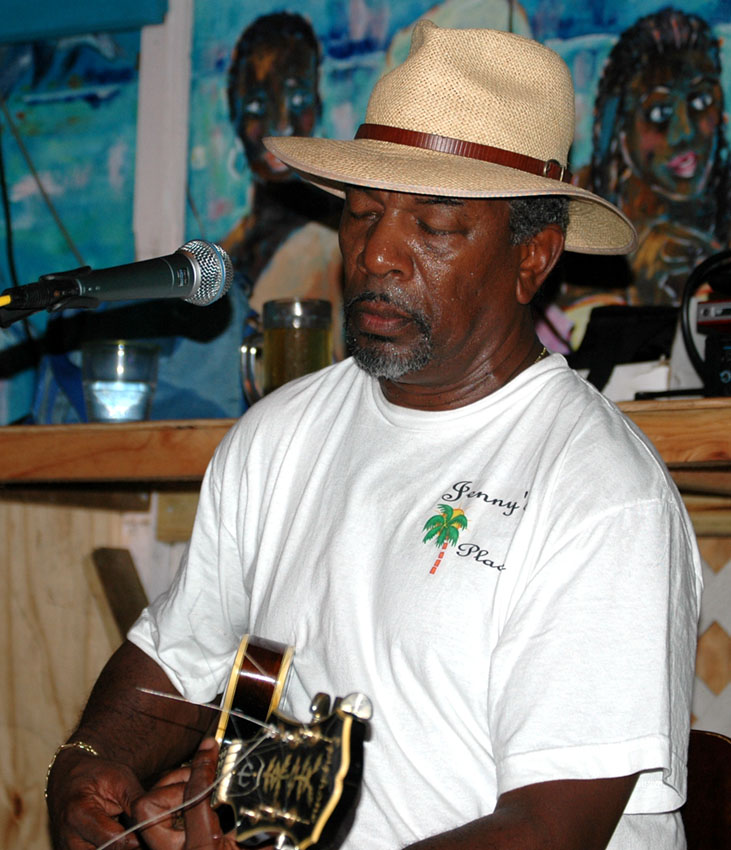
David Emmanuel at Turning Point Diner, Grenada

David Emmanuel is a reggae and jazz musician from Grenada. Emmanuel and his trio play classical Chicago and popular rhythm and blues, jazz and Caribbean music. One member of the band is "Smokie" who is a virtuoso on the Caribbean steel pans.

Emmanuel was the operator of the Turning Point Diner, at Jenny's Place on the north end of Grand Anse Beach, Grenada, until May 2008. He still plays at different resorts and hotels throughout Grenada. He is popular with both tourists and locals. His voice is reminiscent of Barry White and Lou Rawls.

From October 2009 until mid-2010 Emmanuel was doing regular gigs at the Pebbles Jazz & Blues Club in Young Street, St. George's. After that, he was appearing at Mi Hacienda, Belmont, St. George's.

== Early years ==
Emmanuel spent time in London with his brother in the late 1960s and early 1970s. Together they became part of the local music scene and worked as studio musicians. London at the time was bustling in the music industry as a part of the now legendary "British Invasion". David took work as a sideman for live performances. He remembers his brother making friends with Jimi Hendrix. David played with Rod Stewart, Sade, and Billy Ocean, and made friends with Paul McCartney. He recalls spending a weekend at McCartney's Scottish farm.

The early fusion of ska, soul and rhythm and blues into what would become reggae was taking place at this time in London. Peter Tosh and Bob Marley were among the pioneers. Emmanuel familiarized himself with the sound and the reggae musicians.

== Discography ==
- Lovely Day
- Birds of Paradise

== Bibliography ==
- Grenada: a Cultural Profile by Sarah Ramkissoon (Tourist Board of Grenada)
