= Eastern Caribbean Central Bank =

Supranational central bank

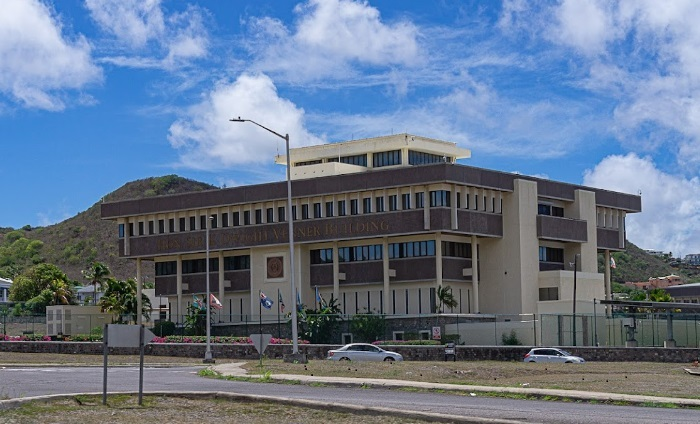
- Headquarters: Basseterre, St. Kitts
- Established: October 1983
- Ownership: 100% state ownership
- Governor: Timothy Antoine
- Central bank of: OECS: Anguilla, Antigua and Barbuda, Dominica, Grenada, Montserrat, Saint Kitts and Nevis, Saint Lucia, and Saint Vincent and the Grenadines
- Currency: Eastern Caribbean dollar XCD (ISO 4217)
- Reserves: 1 560 million USD
- Website: eccb-centralbank.org

The Eastern Caribbean Central Bank (ECCB) is a supranational central bank that serves Anguilla, Antigua and Barbuda, Dominica, Grenada, Montserrat, Saint Kitts and Nevis, Saint Lucia, and Saint Vincent and the Grenadines, all members of the Organisation of Eastern Caribbean States (OECS) that use the ECCB-issued Eastern Caribbean Dollar as their currency. (Three other OECS members, the British Virgin Islands, Guadeloupe and Martinique use other currencies.) The ECCB was established in 1983, succeeding the British Caribbean Currency Board (1950–1965) and the Eastern Caribbean Currency Authority (1965–1983). It is also in charge of bank supervision within its geographical remit. Two of its core mandates are to maintain price and financial sector stability, by acting as a stabiliser and safe-guard of the banking system in the Eastern Caribbean Economic and Currency Union (OECS/ECCU). The bank is headquartered in Basseterre, St. Kitts.

== Background ==
In 1946, a West Indian Currency Conference saw Barbados, British Guiana, the Leeward Islands, Trinidad and Tobago and the Windward Islands agree to establish a unified decimal currency system based on a West Indian dollar to replace the earlier arrangement of having three different Boards of Commissioners of Currency for Barbados (which also served the Leeward and Windward Islands), British Guiana, and Trinidad & Tobago. in 1950, the British Caribbean Currency Board (BCCB) was set up in Trinidad, with the sole right to issue notes and coins of the new unified currency and given the mandate of keeping full foreign exchange cover to ensure convertibility at $4.80 per pound sterling.

In 1951, the British Virgin Islands joined the arrangement, but this led to discontent because that territory was more naturally drawn to the currency of the neighbouring US Virgin Islands. In 1961, the British Virgin Islands withdrew from the arrangement and adopted the US dollar as its currency. In 1964, Trinidad and Tobago withdrew from the currency union (adopting the Trinidad and Tobago dollar) forcing the movement of the headquarters of the BCCB to Barbados.

Under the Eastern Caribbean Currency Agreement 1965, the British West Indies dollar was replaced at par by the Eastern Caribbean dollar and the BCCB was replaced by the Eastern Caribbean Currency Authority (ECCA). British Guiana withdrew from the currency union in 1966. Grenada, which had used the Trinidad and Tobago dollar from 1964, rejoined the common currency arrangement in 1968. Barbados withdrew from the currency union in 1972, following which the ECCA headquarters were moved to Basseterre in St. Kitts.

== History ==
The Eastern Caribbean Central Bank Agreement, signed at Port of Spain on 5 July 1983, established the ECCB as the successor entity of the ECCA, tasked with maintaining the stability and integrity of the subregion's currency and banking system to facilitate the balanced growth and development of its member states.

Unlike the ECCA, the ECCB's competencies include banking supervision jointly with the member states' finance ministries, making it the first-ever supranational banking supervisor ahead of the Central Bank of West African States and Bank of Central African States (which both became banking supervisors in 1990) and European Central Bank (in 2014). The specific role of the ECCB in the supervision of offshore banks, however, varies across OECS countries, leading the International Monetary Fund to observe in 2013 the persistence of "gaps in the regulatory framework" applicable to offshore banks.

In early 2015, the bank announced plans to phase out the production of the 1 and 2-cent pieces. The date was finalised as 1 July 2015. When a motive was sought, it was stated that it takes about six cents to make one cent pieces and about eight cents to make a 2-cent piece.

== Governors ==
- Sir Cecil Jacobs, 1973 to 1989
- Sir K. Dwight Venner, 1989 to 2015
- Timothy Antoine, since 2015

== See also ==
- Economy of the Caribbean
- SUCRE (Unified System for Regional Compensation)
- Eastern Caribbean Securities Exchange
- Currencies of the British West Indies
- Central Bank of Aruba
- Central Bank of Curaçao and Sint Maarten
- Central banks and currencies of the Caribbean
- List of central banks
- List of financial supervisory authorities by country
