= Tillman Thomas =

Grenadian politician

The Honourable Tillman Thomas CBE
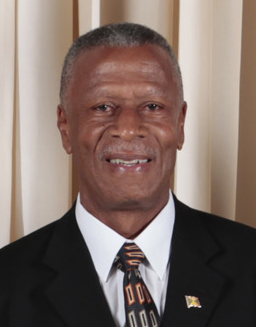
- Thomas in 2009

Prime Minister of Grenada
- In office 9 July 2008 – 20 February 2013
- Monarch: Elizabeth II
- Governors-General: Daniel Williams; Carlyle Glean
- Preceded by: Keith Mitchell
- Succeeded by: Keith Mitchell

Leader of the Opposition
- In office 2 December 2003 – 8 July 2008
- Preceded by: Michael Baptiste
- Succeeded by: Keith Mitchell

Member of Parliament for Saint Patrick East
- In office 2 November 2003 – 19 February 2013
- Preceded by: Adrian F. Mitchell
- Succeeded by: Clifton Paul

Leader of the National Democratic Congress
- In office October 2000 – 14 February 2014
- Preceded by: Joan Purcell
- Succeeded by: Nazim Burke

Personal details
- Born: 13 June 1947 (age 78) Hermitage, Grenada
- Party: National Democratic Congress
- Spouse: Sandra Thomas

Tillman Joseph Thomas, CBE (born 13 June 1947) is a Grenadian politician who served as Prime Minister of Grenada from 2008 to 2013. He was the leader of the National Democratic Congress (NDC) from 2000 to 2014.

== Biography ==
Thomas was born in Hermitage, St. Patrick, Grenada. He was among those imprisoned under Prime Minister Maurice Bishop for two years.

Thomas is a graduate of New York's Fordham University, where he earned a bachelor's degree in economics, as well as the University of the West Indies, Cave Hill Campus and the Hugh Wooding Law School where he completed a LL.B. and a Certificate of Legal Education respectively. His political career began in 1978, when he became involved in the Human Rights and Legal Aid Programme with the leader of the New Jewel Movement, Maurice Bishop.

In December 1984, Thomas was elected to the House of Representatives from St. Patrick East constituency, and from 1984 to 1990, he was a junior minister in the Ministry of Legal Affairs. In 1987, he was a founding member of the NDC, and from 1987 to 1990, he was the party's Assistant General Secretary. Thomas was defeated in St. Patrick East in the 1990 election, but he was, nevertheless, appointed as a junior minister in the Ministry of Labour. Subsequently, he was appointed as minister in the Ministries of Works and Tourism.

Following the NDC's defeat in the 1999 general election, in which it failed to win any seats, Thomas was elected to succeed Joan Purcell as the party leader in October 2000. He won a House of Representatives seat in the November 2003 general election, along with six other members from his party; the NDC fell one seat short of a majority in the 15-seat House of Representatives. However, and the governing New National Party (NNP) won another term. Thomas became Leader of the Opposition in the House of Representatives of Grenada in early December 2003.

After spending 13 years in opposition, the NDC won the general election held on 8 July 2008, taking 11 out of 15 seats and defeating the NNP. Thomas himself was elected from St. Patrick East constituency. On 9 July Thomas was sworn in as Prime Minister at the Grenada Trade Centre in Grand Anse, St. George's by Governor-General Daniel Williams. Speaking on this occasion, he promised "openness and transparency" of government as well as " [the practice of] the politics of inclusion".

Thomas's cabinet, composed of 17 members, was sworn in at the National Stadium on 13 July 2008. In addition to being prime minister, Thomas took the portfolios of Foreign Affairs, Legal Affairs, National Security, Information, and Public Administration. Two members of non-governmental organizations who were not affiliated with the NDC were included in the cabinet: Franka Bernadine as Minister of Education and Human Resources, and Jimmy Bristol as Attorney-General.

After nearly five years in power, the NDC suffered a crushing defeat in the February 2013 general election, losing all of its seats, including the seat held by Thomas. The opposition NNP won all 15 seats, and Keith Mitchell returned to the office as prime minister. In the wake of the defeat, Thomas said at an interview that he was willing to stand aside as the party leader: "Once somebody comes forward, I am prepared to let that person take over the responsibility of leadership of the party".

Thomas was succeeded as the NDC's political leader by Nazim Burke, former deputy political leader and Minister of Finance of Grenada, in early 2014.

Thomas was appointed Commander of the Order of the British Empire (CBE) in the 2023 Birthday Honours for services to Grenada.

Political offices
| Preceded by Keith Mitchell | Prime Minister of Grenada; 2008–2013 | Succeeded by Keith Mitchell |
