= George Brizan =

Prime minister of Grenada (1942–2012)

The Right Honourable George Ignatius Brizan CMG CBE
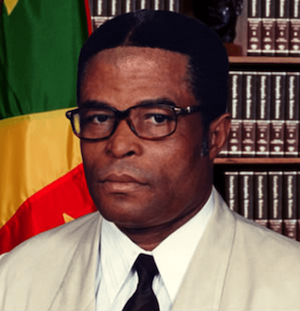

Prime Minister of Grenada
- In office 1 February 1995 – 22 June 1995
- Monarch: Elizabeth II
- Governor-General: Reginald Palmer
- Preceded by: Nicholas Brathwaite
- Succeeded by: Keith Mitchell

Personal details
- Born: 31 October 1942 Windsor Forest, Grenada
- Died: 18 February 2012 (aged 69) St. George's, Grenada
- Party: National Democratic Congress
- Education: University of the West Indies; University of Calgary; Carleton University

George Ignatius Brizan, CMG, CBE (31 October 1942 – 18 February 2012) was a Grenadian politician who served as Prime Minister of Grenada for four months in 1995. He moved to the top post in February, upon the resignation of Nicholas Brathwaite, and remained in office until Keith Mitchell was inaugurated on 22 June.

== Life and career ==
Brizan completed his primary school education at St. Dominic's Roman Catholic Primary School and his secondary education at the venerable Presentation Brothers College (PBC). He later attended the University of the West Indies (UWI) where he obtained a Bachelor of Arts degree in history and a Certificate of Education. Next, he attended the University of Calgary in Canada where he obtained a Master of Arts degree in History and Economics. He holds a second Master of Arts degree in International Economic Relations from Carlton University also in Canada. Upon completion of his studies, Brizan did what many of his contemporaries did not, that is, he returned home. Brizan considered himself an educationalist and he began public service by teaching History and Economics at the venerable Grenada Boys' Secondary School (GBSS). When the then-government of Grenada formed the Institute For Further Education (IFE), a national sixth form college, Brizan took his considerable talents to that institution where he taught History and Economics and served as its vice-principal. During his tenure at GBSS and IFE, Brizan also served as a lecturer at the National Teachers' College. On several occasions, Brizan was called upon by governments to serve in various capacities particularly in the areas of trade and development. At various times in his long and illustrious career, Brizan served as a Trade Union leader, Economics, History and Education Lecturer and even a Sports Announcer/Commentator in the island's annual inter-collegiate track and field competition, popularly known as "Intercol." Brizan had the distinction of working for or consulting with every Grenada government since the late 1960s. And when he became a consultant in the Ministry of Finance in the Keith Mitchell administration, he became and remains to this day the only former Prime Minister in the Caribbean to work for or serve in a successor government. A prolific author, Brizan authored one of the seminal works on Grenada's history, Grenada: Island of Conflict. He also authored The Nutmeg Industry, Grenada's Black Gold which remains an influential publication to this date. Brizan was instrumental in guiding and serving as a role model for hundreds of Grenadian students over the years. Indeed, it was not uncommon for students to declare a desire to be a "Brizan" (i.e. Economist/Historian) as their career goal. That to this day Economics remains one of the most popular courses of study for Grenadian students is a testament to Brizan's influence. Simply put, George Brizan remains a revered figure in the national life of Grenada.

Brizan formed and led the National Democratic Party, which later merged with the Grenada National Party (led by Herbert Blaize) and the Grenada Democratic Movement (led by Dr. Francis Alexis) in August 1984 to create The New National Party (NNP). In April 1987, Brizan went into opposition and founded the National Democratic Congress (NDC). He was the Leader of the Opposition in the House of Representatives of Grenada from 1987 to 1990. He was subsequently succeeded as NDC leader by Nicholas Brathwaite. Braithwaite became Prime Minister following the NDC victory in the 1990 election, and Brizan served in Braithwaite's Cabinet as Minister of Finance before being moved to the post of Minister of Agriculture on 27 April 1992. In both of these positions, he additionally held the portfolios of Trade, Industry, Production and Energy.

After Braithwaite resigned from the party leadership in July 1994, Brizan was elected as NDC leader at a party convention on 4 September 1994. He then became Prime Minister upon Brathwaite's resignation from that position on 1 February 1995. In addition to serving as Prime Minister, he took responsibility for the portfolios of External and National Security, Home Affairs, Agriculture, and Personnel and Management.

The NDC was beaten in the June 1995 general election, and Brizan resigned from the party leadership and active, front-line politics after the NDC suffered a more severe defeat in the January 1999 general election, failing to win any seats. Brizan became again the Leader of the Opposition in the House of Representatives of Grenada for the term from 1995 to 1999. He remained a highly sought-after Economic and Politics expert although he considered himself semi-retired due to pressing health issues.

He was appointed Commander of the Order of the British Empire (CBE) in the 2009 New Year Honours.

Brizan died at the General Hospital in St. George's, Grenada, on 18 February 2012, aged 69. He was given a state funeral and today rests in St. George's Centre Cemetery, not far from Presentation Brothers' College, one of his alma maters.

Political offices
Preceded by Ben Jones	Minister of Finance of Grenada; 1990 – 1992	Succeeded by Nicholas Brathwaite
Preceded by Nicholas Brathwaite	Prime Minister of Grenada; 1995	Succeeded by Keith Mitchell
