= Joseph Andall =

Grenadian politician

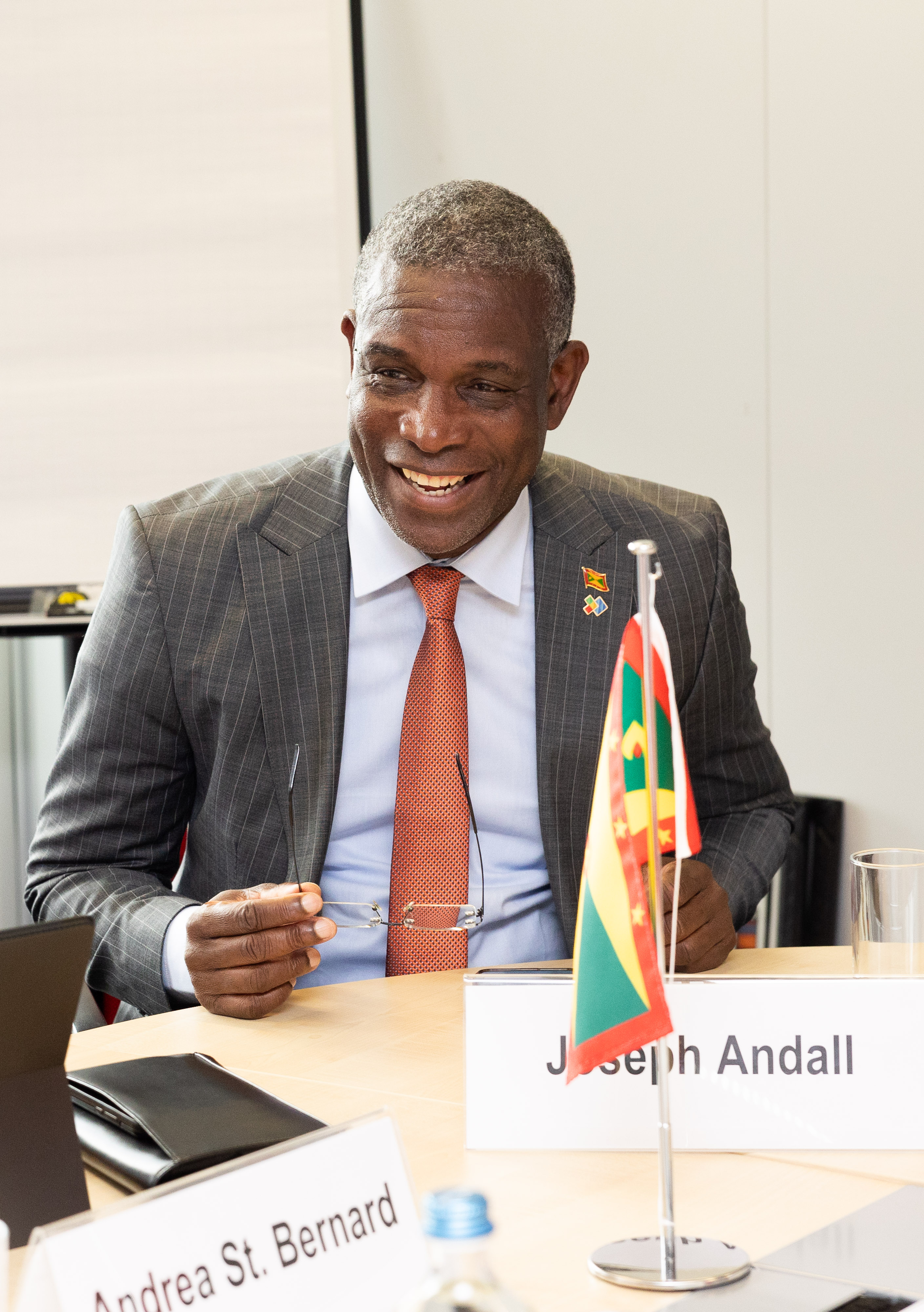
- Joseph Andall in 2023

Minister of Foreign Affairs
- Incumbent
- Assumed office 1 July 2022

Personal details
- Political party: National Democratic Congress

Joseph Andall is a Grenadian politician from the National Democratic Congress who has served in the Cabinet of Grenada as Minister of Foreign Affairs, Trade and Export Development since 1 July 2022. He also represents St. Patrick West in the House of Representatives.
