= Claudette Joseph =

Grenadian politician

Joseph in center

Claudette Joseph is a Grenadian politician from the National Democratic Congress. She has served as the attorney general and minister of legal affairs, labour and consumer affairs since 1 July 2022.
