= Nicholas Brathwaite =

Grenadian politician

The Right Honourable Sir Nicholas Brathwaite OBE, PC
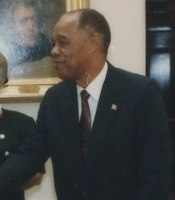

Prime Minister of Grenada
- In office 16 March 1990 – 1 February 1995
- Monarch: Elizabeth II
- Governors General: Sir Paul Scoon; Sir Reginald Palmer
- Deputy: Ben Jones (1990-1991)
- Preceded by: Ben Jones
- Succeeded by: George Brizan

Chairman of the Interim Advisory Council
- In office 9 December 1983 – 4 December 1984
- Monarch: Elizabeth II
- Governor General: Sir Paul Scoon
- Deputy: Allen Kirton
- Preceded by: Hudson Austin
- Succeeded by: Herbert Blaize

Member of Parliament for Carriacou and Petite Martinique
- In office 1990–1995
- Preceded by: Herbert Blaize
- Succeeded by: Joan Purcell

Personal details
- Born: 8 July 1925 Carriacou, Grenada
- Died: 28 October 2016 (aged 91) St. George's, Grenada
- Party: National Democratic Congress
- Spouse: Pansy Brathwaite (?–2009; her death)

Sir Nicholas Alexander Brathwaite OBE, PC (8 July 1925 – 28 October 2016) was a Grenadian politician who was the head of government for two periods, first as Chairman of the Interim Advisory Council (1983 to 1984) established after the United States invasion of Grenada, and later as Prime Minister from 1990 to 1995.

Brathwaite was born in Carriacou, Grenada. He received education from Teacher's Training College in Trinidad and University of the West Indies in Jamaica. Following the 1983 invasion of Grenada, Brathwaite, a member of the National Democratic Congress (NDC), was appointed by Governor-General Sir Paul Scoon to reestablish the Grenadian government. Brathwaite became prime minister and chairman of the advisory council in December 1983, when American troops withdrew. He led Grenada's return to democracy, and served as prime minister for a year, until his party lost the December 1984 elections.

Brathwaite was elected as the leader of the NDC in 1989. The NDC won the 1990 elections, and he served as prime minister again from March 1990 to February 1995. He also held the portfolio of finance minister. He also served as foreign minister during some of that time. He resigned shortly before the 1995 elections, which the NDC lost.

He was appointed an OBE in 1975, and was knighted in 1995. He died on 28 October 2016 at the age of 91.

Political offices
Preceded by Hudson Austin	Chairman of the Interim Advisory Council; 9 December 1983 – 4 December 1984	Succeeded by Herbert Blaize
Preceded by Ben Jones	Prime Minister of Grenada; 16 March 1990 – 1 February 1995	Succeeded by George Brizan
Preceded by George Brizan	Minister of Finance of Grenada; 1992 – 1995	Succeeded by Michael Andrew
