= 2022 Grenadian general election =

- 23 June 2022

All 15 seats in the House of Representatives 8 seats needed for a majority
- Registered: 86,658
- Turnout: 70.32% (▼3.29pp)
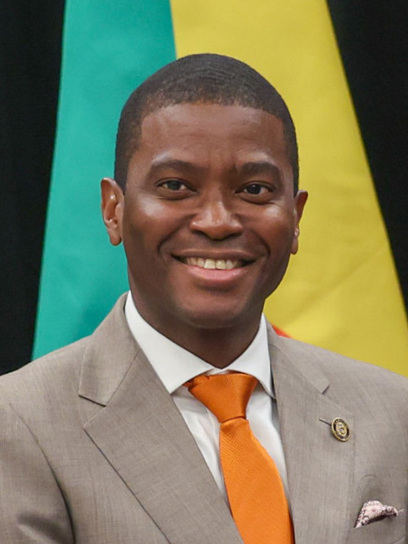

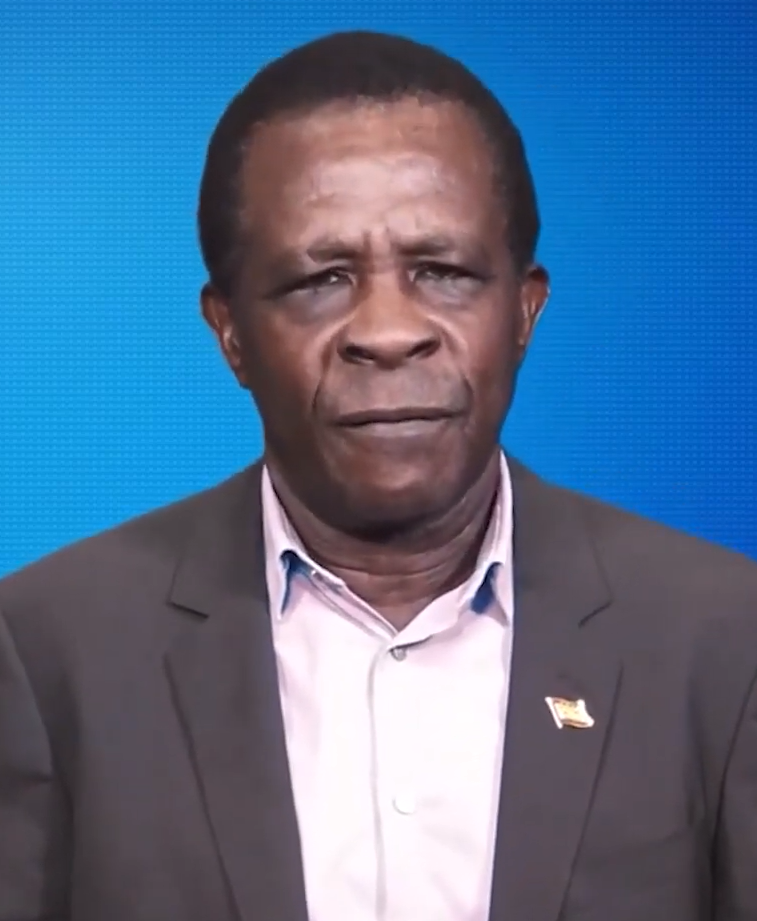
	First party	Second party
Leader	Dickon Mitchell	Keith Mitchell
Party	NDC	NNP
Last election	40.53%, 0 seats	58.91%, 15 seats
Seats won	9	6
Seat change	▲9	▼9
Popular vote	31,430	28,959
Percentage	51.84%	47.76%
Swing	▲11.28pp	▼11.12pp
- Results by constituency
Prime Minister before election
Keith Mitchell
NNP
Elected Prime Minister
Dickon Mitchell
NDC

General elections were held in Grenada on 23 June 2022. The incumbent Prime Minister Keith Mitchell sought a sixth term. National Democratic Congress (NDC) made a return to parliament after nine years of absence, defeating the ruling party New National Party (NNP), which led to Dickon Mitchell becoming the new prime minister of Grenada. This is also the first election since 2008 where the NDC gained seats.

== Background ==
During the previous election held in March 2018, the NNP, led by prime minister Keith Mitchell, was re-elected to a fifth term. Like in the 2013 election, the NNP won all 15 seats in the house of representatives.

Three months after the 2018 election, NDC leader Nazim Burke resigned, and deputy leader Joseph Andall acted as party leader in the interim. Former education minister Franka Bernardine was elected unopposed at the next party convention in November. She resigned in November 2020 for health reasons, with deputy leader Adrian Thomas taking charge in the interim period. The NDC reconvened in October 2021 to elect new party executives; the party chose attorney Dickon Mitchell (no relation) to lead the NDC, with Adrian Thomas as deputy leader.

== Electoral system ==
The 15 members of the House of Representatives are elected by first-past-the-post voting in single-member constituencies.

== Conduct ==
Prime Minister Keith Mitchell advised the governor-general, Dame Cécile La Grenade, to dissolve the House of Representatives on 16 May, one year earlier than the full five years term of the outgoing house. La Grenade issued a writ for the election the following day. Citizens only had one day to register to vote, between the election announcement and the issue of the writ, if they had not done so already. Candidate nominations occurred on 1 June. Police officers voted on 20 June.

The Caribbean Community and the Organization of American States sent delegations to observe the election. The prime minister assured that the presence of both observer missions provided "transparency and confidence to the electoral process".

== Candidates ==
The election saw 41 candidates nominated from five political parties, and one independent candidate. The New National Party (NNP) and the National Democratic Congress (NDC) nominated candidates for all 15 seats. The Grenada United Labour Party (GULP) nominated 4 candidates, while the Independent Freedom Party (IFP) and the Grenada Renaissance Party (GRP) nominated 3 each.

=== Slogans and manifestos ===
Party	Slogans	Manifesto
NNP	"Safer Hands!", "Expanding the Empowerment Agenda"	
NDC	"Transforming Grenada!", "Let's Move Grenada Forward"	
GULP	"GULP to the Rescue", "Independence. Justice. Development"	
IFP	"The Eyes Have It"	

== Results ==
Party	Votes	%	Seats	+/–
National Democratic Congress	31,430	51.84	9	+9
New National Party	28,959	47.76	6	–9
Grenada United Labour Party	64	0.11	0	New
Independent Freedom Party	60	0.10	0	New
Grenada Renaissance Party	31	0.05	0	0
Independents	86	0.14	0	0
Total	60,630	100.00	15	0
Valid votes	60,630	99.49		
Invalid/blank votes	311	0.51		
Total votes	60,941	100.00		
Registered voters/turnout	86,658	70.32		
Source: Grenada Elections 2022

=== By constituency ===
Constituency	Electorate	Turnout	%	Political party	Candidate	Votes	%
Carriacou and Petite Martinique	5,414	3,780	69.81	National Democratic Congress	Tevin Andrews	1,954	51.69
Carriacou and Petite Martinique	5,414	3,780	69.81	New National Party	Kindra Stewart	1,805	47.75
St. Andrew North East	5,362	4,071	75.92	New National Party	Kate Lewis-Peters	2,190	53.79
St. Andrew North East	5,362	4,071	75.92	National Democratic Congress	Tessa St. Cyr	1,864	45.78
St. Andrew North East	5,362	4,071	75.92	Independent Freedom Party	Jennel Ramsee	10	0.24
St. Andrew North West	4,798	3,680	76.69	New National Party	Delma Thomas	1,898	51.57
St. Andrew North West	4,798	3,680	76.69	National Democratic Congress	Gloria Ann Thomas	1,767	48.01
St. Andrew South East	4,868	3,571	73.35	New National Party	Emmalin Pierre	1,893	53.01
St. Andrew South East	4,868	3,571	73.35	National Democratic Congress	David E. Andrew	1660	46.48
St. Andrew South West	5,327	3,855	72.36	National Democratic Congress	Lennox Andrews	2,129	55.22
St. Andrew South West	5,327	3,855	72.36	New National Party	Yoland Bain-Horsford	1,704	44.20
St. David	9,866	7,189	72.86	National Democratic Congress	Dickon Mitchell	4,414	61.39
St. David	9,866	7,189	72.86	New National Party	Oliver Joseph	2,742	38.14
St. David	9,866	7,189	72.86	Independent Freedom Party	Junior Francis	18	0.25
St. George North East	7,727	5,390	69.75	National Democratic Congress	Ron Redhead	3,220	59.74
St. George North East	7,727	5,390	69.75	New National Party	Nimrod Ollivierre	2,133	39.57
St. George North East	7,727	5,390	69.75	Grenada Renaissance Party	Martin Edwards	15	0.27
St. George North West	4,534	2,995	66.05	New National Party	Keith Mitchell	2,211	73.82
St. George North West	4,534	2,995	66.05	National Democratic Congress	Jonathan LaCrette	773	25.80
St. George South	10,903	7,019	64.37	National Democratic Congress	Andy Williams	4,029	57.40
St. George South	10,903	7,019	64.37	New National Party	Sebastian Cox	2,961	42.18
St. George South	10,903	7,019	64.37	Grenada Renaissance Party	Mendell Samuel	12	0.17
St. George South East	5,413	3,800	70.20	National Democratic Congress	Alfred Telesford	2,122	55.84
St. George South East	5,413	3,800	70.20	New National Party	Gregory Bowen	1,634	43.0
St. George South East	5,413	3,800	70.20	Independent Freedom Party	Bassanio Nicholas	32	0.84
St. George South East	5,413	3,800	70.20	Grenada Renaissance Party	Dennyka Checkley	4	0.10
St. John	6,392	4,464	69.83	National Democratic Congress	Kerryne James	2,216	49.64
St. John	6,392	4,464	69.83	New National Party	Martin DaBreo	2,209	49.48
St. John	6,392	4,464	69.83	Grenada United Labour Party	Geoffrey Preudhomme	19	0.42
St. Mark	3,690	2,498	67.69	New National Party	Clarice Modeste-Curwen	1,470	58.84
St. Mark	3,690	2,498	67.69	National Democratic Congress	Quinc Britton	995	39.83
St. Mark	3,690	2,498	67.69	Grenada United Labour Party	David Francis	18	0.72
St. Patrick East	3,914	2,791	71.30	National Democratic Congress	Dennis Matthew-Cornwall	1,443	51.70
St. Patrick East	3,914	2,791	71.30	New National Party	Pamela Moses	1,322	47.36
St. Patrick East	3,914	2,791	71.30	Grenada United Labour Party	Nigel John	18	0.64
St. Patrick West	4,668	3,288	70.43	National Democratic Congress	Joseph Andall	1,726	52.49
St. Patrick West	4,668	3,288	70.43	New National Party	Victor Philip	1,458	44.34
St. Patrick West	4,668	3,288	70.43	Independent	Winston Frederick	86	2.61
St. Patrick West	4,668	3,288	70.43	Grenada United Labour Party	Augustine David	9	0.27
Town of St. George	3,781	2,462	65.11	New National Party	Peter David	1,329	53.98
Town of St. George	3,781	2,462	65.11	National Democratic Congress	Claudette Joseph	1,118	45.41
Source: Grenada Elections 2022

== Aftermath ==
Outgoing prime minister Keith Mitchell called Dickon Mitchell to congratulate him on his electoral triumph. At the same time, he urged the incoming prime minister to consider preserving programs implemented by the NNP government, which he said delivered a significant benefit to ordinary Grenadians. Keith Mitchell, who became opposition leader, vowed to provide the new government with a productive opposition and insisted it would be "nothing personal". Dickon Mitchell was sworn in as prime minister on 24 June 2022.

Mitchell was congratulated by foreign leaders, including Cuban president Miguel Díaz-Canel and the prime minister of St. Vincent and the Grenadines, Ralph Gonsalves.
