= List of political parties in Grenada =

This article lists political parties in Grenada. Grenada has a two-party system, which means that there are two dominant political parties. For other parties it is extremely difficult to achieve substantial electoral success.

== Active parties ==
=== Major parties ===
Party	Abbr.	Founded	Ideology	Political position	Leader	House of Representatives	Senate
National Democratic Congress	NDC	1987	Social democracy; Social liberalism; Republicanism; Progressivism	Centre-left	Dickon Mitchell	14 / 15	7 / 13
New National Party	NNP	1984	Conservatism; Economic liberalism; Factions: Republicanism	Centre-right	Emmalin Pierre	1 / 15	3 / 13

=== Minor parties ===
Party	Abbr.	Founded	Ideology	Political position	Leader	House of Representatives	Senate
Grenada United Labour Party	GULP	1950	Populism; Nationalism; Republicanism; Conservatism; Labourism	Right-wing	Geoffrey Preudhomme	0 / 15	0 / 13
Grenada Renaissance Party	GRP	2003	Agrarianism	Centre	Martin Edwards	0 / 15	0 / 13
People's National Party	PNP	2025	Conservatism; Liberal conservatism; Christian democracy	Centre-right	Jonathan La Crette	0 / 15	0 / 13
Democratic People's Movement	DPM	2025	Social democracy	Centre-left	Peter David	0 / 15	0 / 13

== Historical parties ==
Party	Abbr.	Ideology	Political position	Leader	Years active
New Joint Endeavor for Welfare, Education, and Liberation	New JEWEL Movement	Communism; Marxism–Leninism; Revolutionary socialism; Pan-Africanism	Far-left	Maurice Bishop	1973–1983
Maurice Bishop Patriotic Movement	MBPM	Communism; Marxism; Socialism	Far-left	George Louison; Kendrick Radix	1983–2002
People's Labour Movement	PLM	Democratic socialism; Labourism; Left-wing populism; Progressivism; Secularism; Social democracy	Left-wing to centre-left	Francis Alexis; Terence Marryshow	1995–2008
Grenada National Party	GNP	Conservatism; Economic liberalism; 1961–1962: Grenada-Trinidad unionism	Centre-right	Herbert Blaize	1955–1984

- Good Old Democracy
- United Republican Party
- Christian Democratic Labour Party
- Grenada Federated Labour Party

== See also ==
- Politics of Grenada
- List of political parties by country
