= 2013 Grenadian general election =

- 19 February 2013

All 15 seats in the House of Representatives 8 seats needed for a majority
- Registered: 62,155
- Turnout: 88.58% (▲9.27pp)
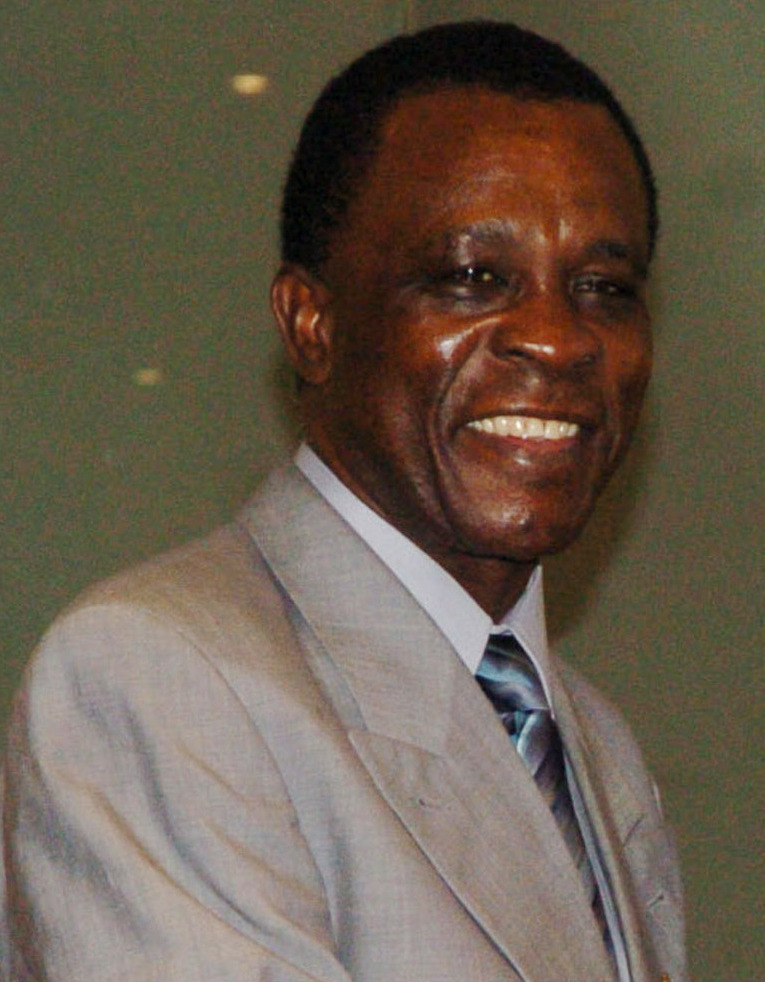

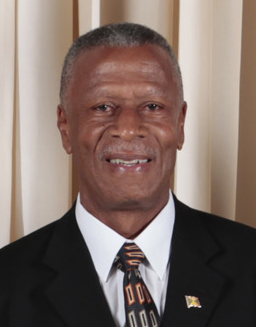
	First party	Second party
Leader	Keith Mitchell	Tillman Thomas
Party	NNP	NDC
Last election	47.96%, 4 seats	51.17%, 11 seats
Seats won	15	0
Seat change	▲11	▼11
Popular vote	32,205	22,377
Percentage	58.71%	40.79%
Swing	▲10.75pp	▼10.38pp
- Results by constituency
Prime Minister before election
Tillman Thomas
NDC
Elected Prime Minister
Keith Mitchell
NNP

General elections were held in Grenada on 19 February 2013. The result was a landslide victory for the opposition New National Party, which won all 15 seats.

== Date ==
The election date was announced by Prime Minister Tillman Thomas at the National Democratic Congress Party Convention at Sauteurs Bus Station on 13 January 2013.

== Electoral system ==
The fifteen members of the House of Representatives were elected in single-member constituencies by first-past-the-post voting.

== Candidates ==
Constituency	Candidates	Party
St. Patrick East	Tillman Thomas	National Democratic Congress
St. Patrick East	Clifton Paul	New National Party
St. Patrick East	Valdon Crosley Paul	National United Front
St. Patrick East	Winston Frederick	People United Labour Party
Carriacou and Petite Martinique	Randolph Harrison Fleary	National Democratic Congress
Carriacou and Petite Martinique	Elvin Nimrod	New National Party
Carriacou and Petite Martinique	Clint John	Movement of Independent Candidates
Town of St. George	Franka Bernadine	National Democratic Congress
Town of St. George	Nicholas Steele	New National Party
Town of St. George	Standford Simon	Good Old Democratic Party
St. George North East	Nazim Burke	National Democratic Congress
St. George North East	Tobias Clement	New National Party
St. George North East	Lawrence Amadé	Movement of Independent Candidates
St. George North East	Oswald Roderick Mc Burnie	Grenada United Patriotic Movement
St. George North East	Martin Washington Edwards	Grenada Renaissance Party
St. George South	Merle Byer	National Democratic Congress
St. George South	Alexandra Otway - Noël	New National Party
St. George South	Glynis Roberts	National United Front
St. George South East	Randal Robinson	National Democratic Congress
St. George South East	Gregory Bowen	New National Party
St. George South East	Ferron Curlan Lowe	National United Front
St. George South East	Abdurraheem A. Jones	Movement of Independent Candidates
St. Andrew South West	Sylvester Quarless	National Democratic Congress
St. Andrew South West	Yolande Bain-Horsford	New National Party
St. Andrew North West	Alleyne Walker	National Democratic Congress
St. Andrew North West	Delma Thomas	New National Party
St. David	Adrian Thomas	National Democratic Congress
St. David	Oliver Joseph	New National Party
St. David	Justin Mc Burnie	Good Old Democratic Party
St. David	Raphael Victor Baptiste	Independent
St. Andrew North East	Terry Hillaire	National Democratic Congress
St. Andrew North East	Roland Bhola	New National Party
St. Andrew North East	Raleigh W. Date	Independent
St. George North West	Ali Dowden	National Democratic Congress
St. George North West	Keith Mitchell	New National Party
St. George North West	Oswald Peter	Grenada United Patriotic Movement
St. George North West	Desmond Cuthbert Sandy	Grenada Renaissance Party
St. Patrick West	Joseph Andall	National Democratic Congress
St. Patrick West	Anthony Boatswain	New National Party
St. John	George Vincent	National Democratic Congress
St. John	Alvin DaBreo	New National Party
St. John	Lyntoria Welch	Grenada Renaissance Party
St. Mark	Denneth Modeste	National Democratic Congress
St. Mark	Clarice Modeste-Curwen	New National Party
St. Andrew South East	Patrick Simmons	National Democratic Congress
St. Andrew South East	Emmalin Pierre	New National Party
Source: Grenada Broadcast

== Conduct ==
The preliminary report from invited Organisation of American States election observers was positive regarding the "civil and peaceful" election and its high turnout. The observers noted minor bureaucratic problems, and recommended greater enactment of campaign finance regulations. The observers also noted that women were under-represented in the list of candidates (9 of 48) and elected representatives (4 of 15).

== Results ==
Party	Votes	%	Seats	+/–
New National Party	32,205	58.71	15	+11
National Democratic Congress	22,377	40.79	0	–11
National United Front	186	0.34	0	New
Movement of Independent Candidates	25	0.05	0	New
Grenada Renaissance Party	20	0.04	0	New
Good Old Democratic Party	14	0.03	0	New
Grenada United Patriotic Movement	14	0.03	0	New
People's United Labour Party	11	0.02	0	New
Independents	5	0.01	0	0
Total	54,857	100.00	15	0
Valid votes	54,857	99.63		
Invalid/blank votes	201	0.37		
Total votes	55,058	100.00		
Registered voters/turnout	62,155	88.58		
Source: PEO

With a Gallagher Index of 40.81, this election is considered to be the most disproportionate in modern history, due to the NDC receiving over two fifths of the vote yet not receiving any seats in the House of Representatives.
