= Kate Lewis =

Grenadian politician

The Honourable Kate Skeeter Lewis-Peters

Minister with responsibility for Youth Development
- In office 2018–2022
- Appointed by: Keith Mitchell

Member of the House of Representatives for Saint Andrew North East
- Incumbent
- Assumed office 2018
- Preceded by: Roland Bhola

Personal details
- Born: 1982 (age 43–44) Paradise, Saint Andrew, Grenada
- Party: New National Party
- Education: University of the West Indies
- Occupation: Politician
- Profession: Teacher

Kate Skeeter Lewis-Peters (born c. 1982), commonly known as Kate Lewis or by her nickname Skeeter, is a Grenadian politician and former secondary school teacher. A member of the New National Party (NNP), she has represented the constituency of Saint Andrew North East in the House of Representatives of Grenada since 2018, and served as the Minister with responsibility for Youth Development in the Office of the Prime Minister from 2018 to 2022 under Keith Mitchell.

== Early life and teaching career ==
Lewis-Peters is from the village of Paradise in the parish of Saint Andrew. She earned a Bachelor's Degree in Accounting with First Class Honours from the University of the West Indies.

Before entering politics she taught for seventeen years, beginning at Holy Innocents Anglican School and St. Andrew's Primary School before moving to St. Joseph's Convent in Grenville, where she led the school's Junior Achievement Programme to multiple Company of the Year titles.

== Political career ==
=== Entry into politics (2017–2018) ===
In August 2017, the NNP named Lewis-Peters – then a 35-year-old secondary school teacher – as its caretaker for Saint Andrew North East, succeeding the retiring General Secretary Roland Bhola. She was one of seven women among the party's fifteen caretakers, the highest number of female candidates ever fielded by a Grenadian political party at that time. Later in 2017 she was appointed to the Senate and served as Parliamentary Secretary in the Ministry of Education and Human Resources until 2018.

=== Minister of Youth Development (2018–2022) ===
At the general election of 13 March 2018, Lewis-Peters was elected MP for Saint Andrew North East as part of an NNP sweep of all fifteen seats. She was subsequently appointed Minister with responsibility for Youth Development in the Office of the Prime Minister.

In November 2020, Lewis-Peters drew public criticism after she distributed face masks bearing her own image to children at two primary schools in her constituency, Belair Government School and Sacred Heart Roman Catholic School in Tivoli. Education Minister Emmalin Pierre publicly stated that the action was not in keeping with the Ministry of Education's policy on the distribution of political material in schools.

=== Opposition MP (2022–present) ===
At the general election of 23 June 2022, the NNP lost power to the National Democratic Congress (NDC) led by Dickon Mitchell, losing nine of its fifteen seats. Lewis-Peters, however, retained Saint Andrew North East with 2,190 votes (53.80%), defeating Tessa St. Cyr of the NDC (1,864 votes, 45.79%) and Jennel Karla Ramsee of the Independent Freedom Party (10 votes, 0.25%).

She has since served as an opposition MP – reported to be the youngest member on the opposition benches – and sits on the Public Accounts Committee of the House of Representatives alongside Opposition Leader Emmalin Pierre. In January 2025, Lewis-Peters publicly rejected reports circulating on social media that she had resigned from the NNP, stating that she remained "fully committed" to the party.

== Personal life ==
Lewis-Peters is known by the nickname "Skeeter" and continues to reside in Paradise, Saint Andrew.
