= George James McGuire =

George McGuire

Speaker of the House of Representatives of Grenada
- In office 30 August 2008 – 9 January 2013
- Prime Minister: Tillman Thomas
- Preceded by: Lawrence Albert Joseph
- Succeeded by: Michael Pierre
- In office 17 January 2003 – 29 October 2003
- Prime Minister: Keith Mitchell
- Preceded by: Curtis Strachan
- Succeeded by: Lawrence Albert Joseph

Personal details
- Party: New National Party; National Democratic Congress

George James McGuire is a politician from Grenada and former Speaker of the House and Minister of Education and Sports.

During Grenadian Revolution, McGuire was a teacher at Grenada Boys' Secondary School. He entered politics in 1984, and was elected in the 1984 elections under New National Party (NNP). He was elected as the representative of town of Saint George. He was appointed as Minister of Education and Sports from 1984 to 1990.

McGuire then worked as an educator in St. George's University. He was nominated by Keith Mitchell as the Speaker of the House of Representatives and elected in January 2003, but Mitchell was not willing to nominate him again in 2004. Instead, NDC was willing to reappoint McGuire.

McGuire was elected on 20 August 2008 as the Speaker of the House of Representatives on National Democratic Congress (NDC) mandate.
