= Saint Andrew South East (Grenada) =

Saint Andrew South East Constituency
- Constituency
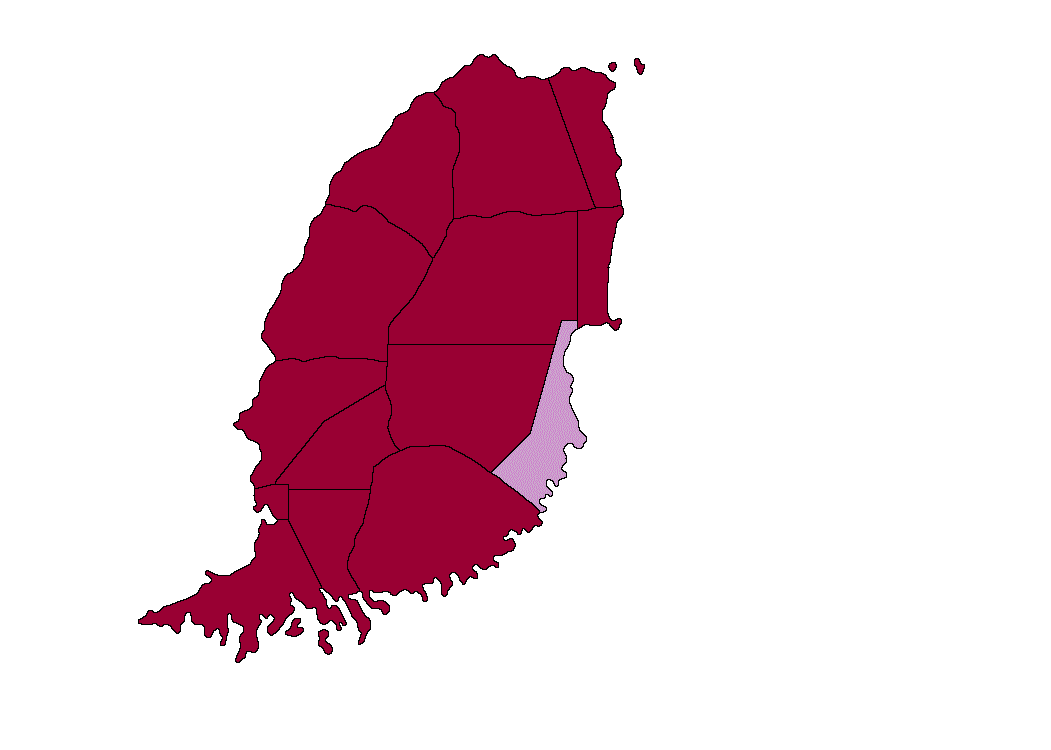
- Country: Grenada
- Parish: St Andrew
- Constituency Minister: David E. Andrew
- Capital City: Grenville

Saint Andrew South East is one of the 15 parliamentary constituencies of the Caribbean nation of Grenada.

== Members ==
Year	Winner	Party
1984-1990	Francis Alexis	Grenada National Party
1990-1999	Francis Alexis	National Democratic Congress
1999-2008	Gregory Bowen	New National Party
2008-2013	Patrick Simmons	National Democratic Congress
2013-2026	Emmalin Pierre	New National Party
2026-current	David E. Andrew	National Democratic Congress

== Election results ==
=== 2022 ===
Candidate	Party	Votes	%
Emmalin Pierre	NNP	1,893	53.28
David E. Andrew	NDC	1,660	46.72
Total		3,553	100.00
Registered voters/turnout		4,868	–
NNP hold			
