= Michael Pierre =

Michael Pierre MBE

Speaker of the House of Representatives of Grenada
- In office 27 March 2013 – 31 August 2022
- Prime Minister: Keith Mitchell
- Preceded by: George McGuire
- Succeeded by: Leo Cato

Personal details
- Born: 1948 (age 77–78) Colony of Grenada
- Party: New National Party

Michael Pierre, MBE, is a politician from Grenada who was elected twice as Speaker of the House of Representatives of Grenada from 27 March 2013 to 31 August 2022. He is from the New National Party (NNP).

Pierre was born in 1948. He worked as permanent secretary in the ministry of education until his retirement in 2009. He was also appointment as Member of the Most Excellent Order of the British Empire (MBE) in January 2009.

He is the elder brother of Tafawa Pierre, who is the husband of NNP leader Emmalin Pierre. The Pierre family is strongly aligned with the NNP.
