= 1931 Grenadian general election =

General elections in Grenada held in 1931

General elections were held in Grenada in 1931.

== Electoral system ==
The Legislative Council consisted of 16 members; the Governor (who served as president of the council), seven 'official' members (civil servants), three appointed members and five elected members. Voting was restricted to men aged 21 or over and women aged 30 or over who had resided in Grenada for at least two years and either had an income of at least £30 per year, owned property valued at £150 or more, or rented property for at least £12 per annum. Candidacy was restricted to qualified male voters with a minimum annual income of £200 and who either had lived in their constituency for at least a year, or owned property in the constituency worth at least £500.

There were 2,272 registered voters, up from 2,088 in 1928.

== Results ==
The Grenada Workingmen's Association had four candidates; T.A. Marryshow, George Elmore Edwards, John Fleming and Fitz Henry Copland. The GWA also supported Willan E. Julien in St David's – South St George's.

Constituency	Member
St Andrew's	George Elmore Edwards
St David's – South St George's	Willan E. Julien
St George's	T.A. Marryshow
St John's – St Mark's	John Fleming
St Patrick's and Carriacou	Frederick B. Paterson
Source: Brizan
