= Member of Parliament of Carriacou and Petite Martinique =

Carriacou and Petite Martinique Constituency
- Constituency
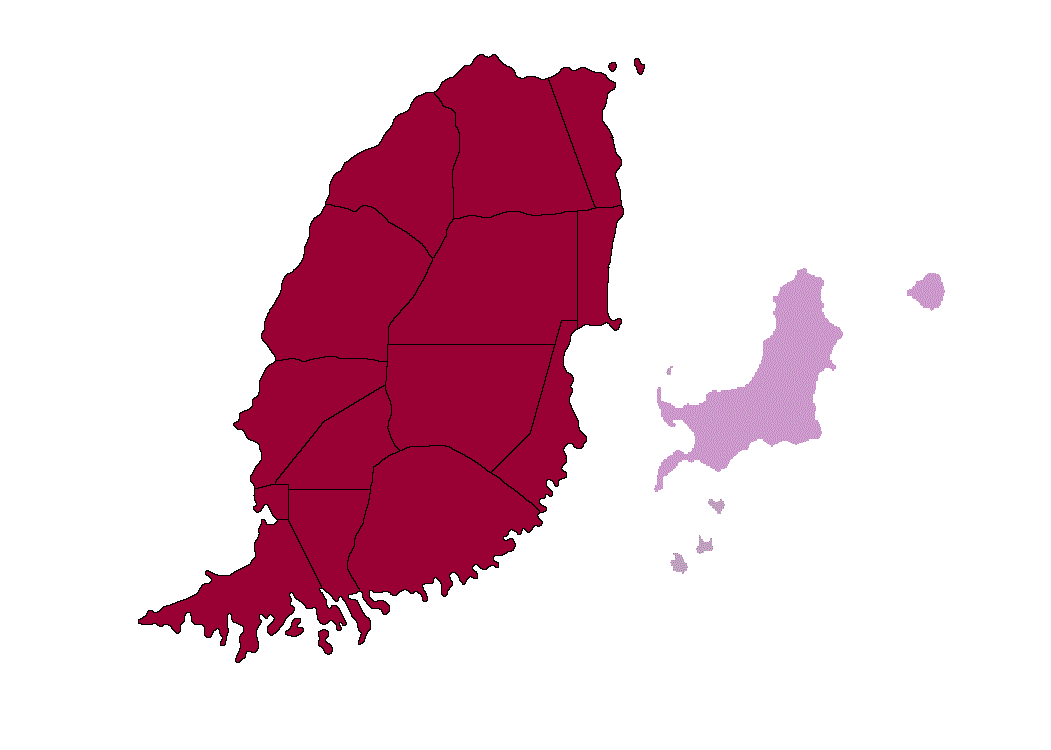
- Country: Grenada
- Dependency Country: Carriacou and Petite Martinique
- Constituency Minister: Kindra B. Maturine-Stewart
- Capital City: Hillsborough

Carriacou and Petite Martinique, a dependency of Grenada, returns one member to the country's Parliament.

== Members since 1935 ==
Year	Member	Party	Notes
1944–1947	Frederick B. Paterson	Independent	First Carriacou and Petite Martinique MP of the Independent Party
1951-1952	Cyril Sylvester	Grenada People Party (Note: Now Grenada United Labour Party)	First Carriacou and Petite Martinique MP of the Grenada People party. Shortest term: died in office.
1952-1954	Eva Sylvester	Grenada United Labour Party	First (and first female) Carriacou and Petite Martinique MP of the Grenada United Labour Party. From Petite Martinique.
1954-1957	Frederick B. Paterson	Independent	First Carriacou and Petite Martinique MP, third on the MP list.
1957–1989	Herbert Augustus Blaize	Grenada National Party (Note: Now New National Party)	First Carriacou and Petite Martinique MP of the longest term of Carriacou and Petite Martinique MP, the Grenada National Party and was Prime Minister and Premier of Grenada the same he was MP.
1990–1995	Nicholas Brathwaite	National Democratic Congress	First Carriacou and Petite Martinique MP of the National Democratic Congress
1995–1999	Joan Purcell	National Democratic Congress	
1999–2018	Elvin Nimrod	New National Party	First Carriacou and Petite Martinique MP of the New National Party.
2018–2022	Kindra Maturine-Stewart	New National Party	
2022–	Tevin Andrews	National Democratic Congress	

== Elections ==
=== Elections in the 2000s ===
General election 2008: Carriacou and Petite Martinique
Party	Candidate	Votes	%	±%
NNP	Elvin Nimrod	1,948	53.9	▲3.9
NDC	George Prime	1,666	46.1	▼3.7
Majority		282	7.8	▲7.8
Turnout		3,614	81.76	▲16.46
NNP hold		Swing	▼7.22	

General election 2003: Carriacou and Petite Martinique
Party	Candidate	Votes	%	±%
NNP	Elvin Nimrod	1,431	50.0	▼5.4
NDC	George Prime	1,424	49.8	▲5.8
Independent	Donald S Charles	5	0.2	
Majority		2	0.0	▼5.4
Turnout		2,860	65.30	▲6.7
NNP hold		Swing	▼15.66	
