= Grace Duncan =

Deputy Prime Minister of Grenada
- In office September 1995 – July 1997
- Prime Minister: Keith Mitchell
- Preceded by: Ben Jones
- Succeeded by: Gregory Bowen

Personal details
- Party: New National Party; Grenada United Labour Party

Grace M. Duncan is Grenadian businesswoman, politician, former cabinet minister and Deputy Prime Minister of Grenada.

Duncan was an elected member of the House of Representatives of Grenada from 1984 to 1990 from New National Party (NNP). She was Minister of Women's Affairs in the NNP government

Duncan was elected again as a member of House of Representatives of Grenada from 1995 to 1999 from St. John constituency. She was in the cabinet of Keith Mitchell. She held the portfolios of Minister of Health, Minister of Tourism, Minister of Public Works, Minister of Communications and Civil Aviation. Additionally she was appointed Deputy Prime Minister of Grenada in September 1995.

On 16 July 1997 she was fired by Prime Minister Keith Mitchell due to "vulgar attacks she made against the office of the Prime Minister". In 1998 she and minister Raphael Fletcher resigned from the ruling party. She joined Grenada United Labour Party (GULP).
