= Saint Andrew North East (Grenada) =

Saint Andrew North East Constituency
- Constituency
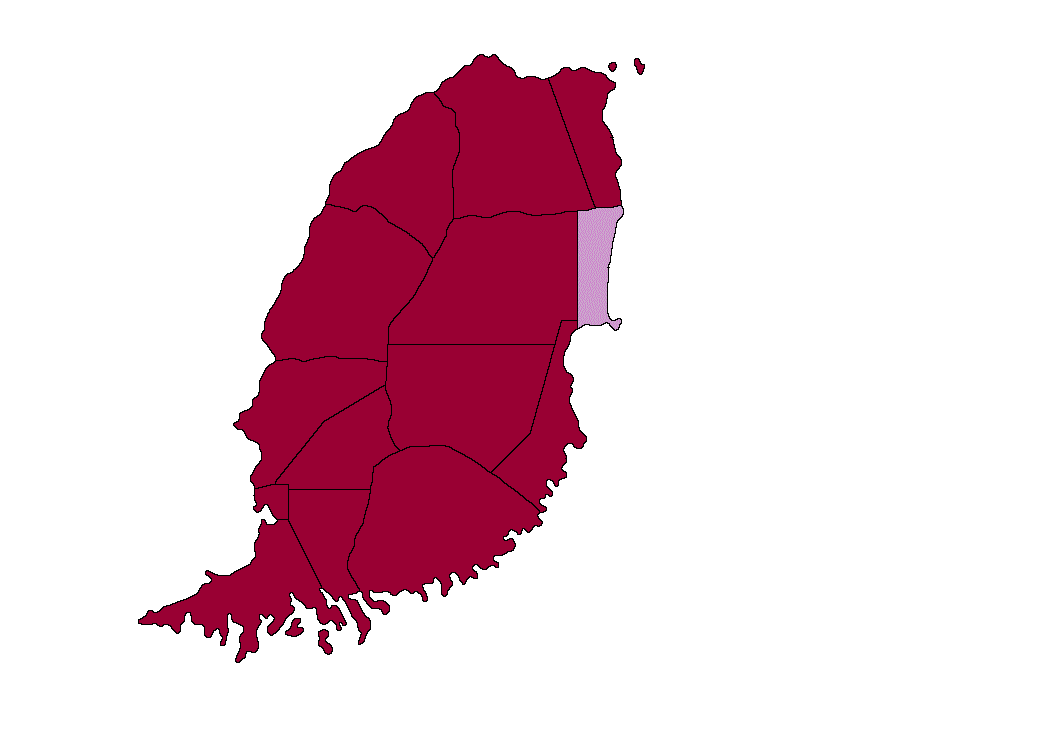
- Country: Grenada
- Parish: St Andrew
- Constituency Minister: Roland Bhola
- Capital City: Conference

Saint Andrew North East is a constituency of Grenada, within the parish of Saint Andrew. Its capital is Conference.

== Constituency Ministers ==
Year	Winner	Party
1984-1990	Marcel Peters	Grenada United Labour Party
1990-1995	Lawrence Gibbs	Grenada United Labour Party
1995-2003	Oliver Archibald	New National Party
2003-Date	Roland Bhola	New National Party

== Election results ==
=== 2022 ===
Candidate	Party	Votes	%
Kate Lewis-Peters	NNP	2,190	53.89
Tessa St. Cyr	NDC	1,864	45.87
Jennel Ramsee	IFP	10	0.25
Total		4,064	100.00
Registered voters/turnout		5,362	–
NNP hold			
