= Leo Cato =

Speaker of the House of Representatives of Grenada
- Incumbent
- Assumed office 31 August 2022
- Prime Minister: Dickon Mitchell
- Preceded by: Michael Pierre

Personal details
- Born: 6 September 1967 (age 59)
- Party: National Democratic Congress
- Education: Kingston University

Leo Cato is a politician from Grenada who is serving as Speaker of the House of Representatives of Grenada since 31 August 2022.

Cato was born on 6 September 1967 and was previously the chairman of the board of the Grenada Co-operative Nutmeg Association (GCNA). He is also a former public servant in the ministry of education.

Cato has a master's degree in computer systems design from Kingston University and a PhD in educational technology at Walden University.
