= Sylvester Quarless =

Grenada politician

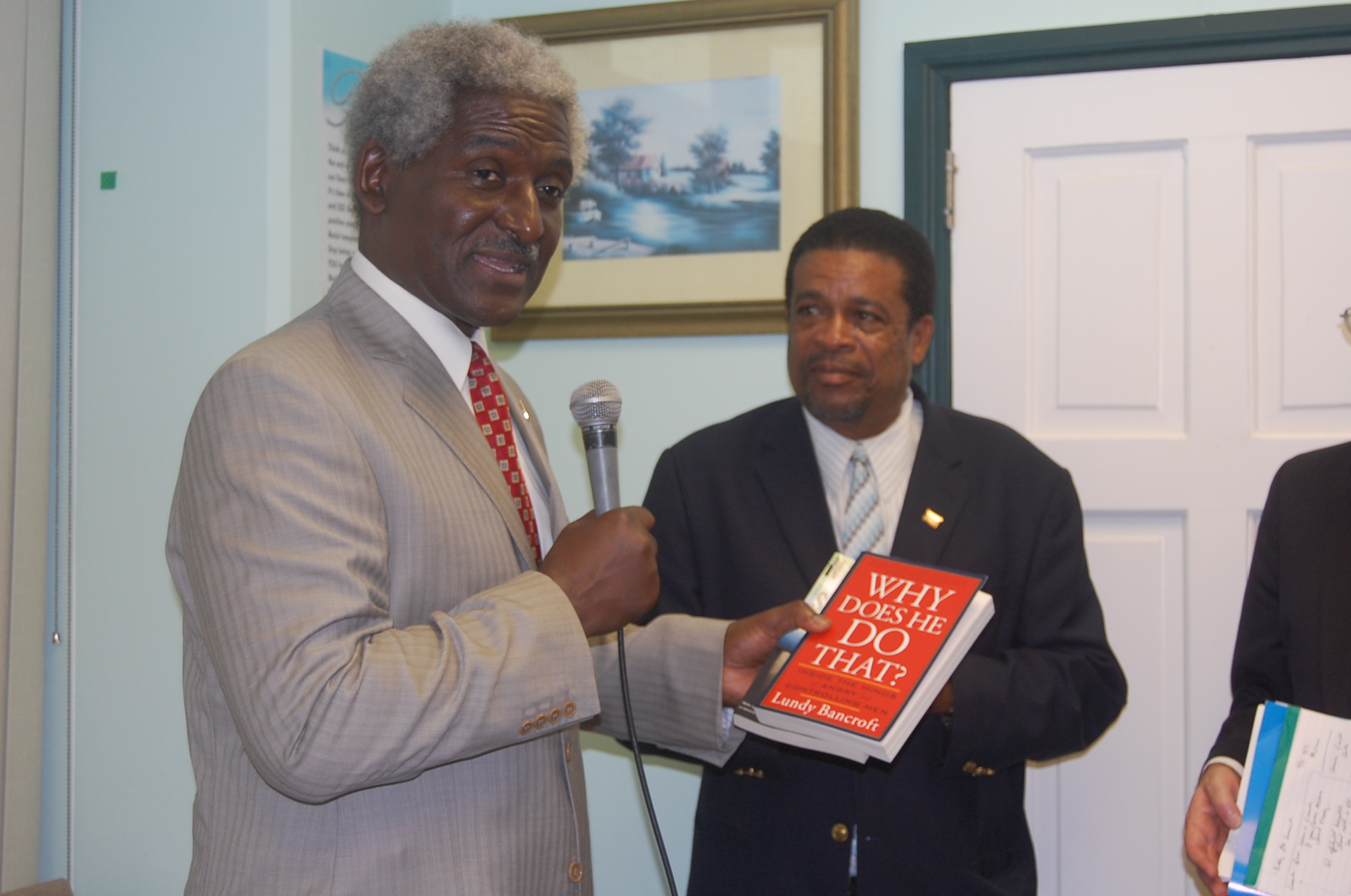
Quarless with US Ambassador Larry Leon Palmer (2012)

Sylvester Quarless is a politician from the island of Grenada. He is a member of the National Democratic Congress, represents the constituency of St Andrew Southwest in the House of Representatives of Grenada and is currently Grenada's Minister of Social Development.
