= Brenda Hood =

Grenadian politician

Brenda Hood is a Grenadian politician of the New National Party.

She was an elected member of the House of Representatives of Grenada from 1999 to 2003. She was an appointed member of the Senate of Grenada from 2003 to 2008. She has served as the island's Minister of Tourism. In 2014, she became Minister for Culture.
