= 1928 Grenadian general election =

General elections in Grenada held on 11 April 1928

General elections were held in Grenada on 11 April 1928.

== Electoral system ==
The Legislative Council consisted of 16 members; the Governor (who served as president of the council), seven 'official' members (civil servants), three appointed members and five elected members. Voting was restricted to men aged 21 or over and women aged 30 or over who had resided in Grenada for at least two years and either had an income of at least £30 per year, owned property valued at £150 or more, or rented property for at least £12 per annum. Candidacy was restricted to qualified male voters with a minimum annual income of £200 and who either had lived in their constituency for at least a year, or owned property in the constituency worth at least £500.

Only 2,088 people were eligible to vote, down from 2,159 in the 1925 elections.

== Results ==
Two constituencies – St David's – South St George's and St George's, had only one candidate, who was elected unopposed.

| Constituency | Member |
|---|---|
| St Andrew's | George Elmore Edwards |
| St David's – South St George's | Joseph de la Mothe |
| St George's | T.A. Marryshow |
| St John's – St Mark's | John Fleming |
| St Patrick's and Carriacou | Fitz Henry Copland |
Source: Emmanuel
