= Yolande Bain-Horsford =

Grenadian politician

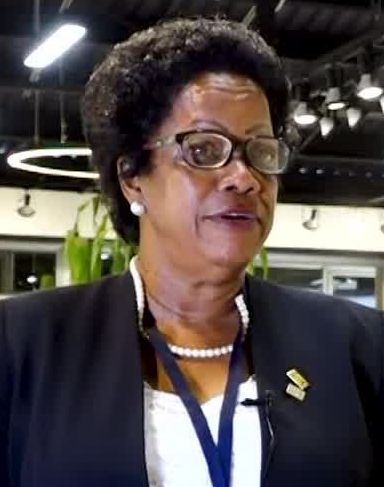

Minister of Tourism
- In office 2014–2017
- Prime Minister: Keith Mitchell
- Preceded by: Alexandra Otway-Noel

Personal details
- Born: 1950 (age 75–76) Saint Andrew Parish, Grenada
- Party: New National Party
- Occupation: Government minister

Yolande Bain-Horsford (born 1950) is a Grenadian politician who has been a Minister of Tourism, the Minister for Agriculture and the Minister of Sport and Culture. She is a leading member of Grenada's New National Party.

== Life ==
Bain-Horsford was born in Saint Andrew Parish in about 1950.

In 2013 her party won every seat in the election and in 2014 Prime Minister Dr Keith Mitchell rearranged his cabinet and she became the tourism minister taking over from Alexandra Otway-Noel who had held that role. Otway-Noel became a minister without portfolio.

When the New National Party Women's Arm held its 2017 Convention it was at Boca Secondary School. Bain-Horsford was the interim chairperson. There are over 72,000 voters in Grenada and about 37,000 of them are women.

In 2017 she was the Minister of Agriculture. One of her concerns was food safety because it was a growing concern of the United States and the European Union. She warned nutmeg farmers to be cautious. She was still looking after agriculture in 2020, as COVID-19 meant that farmers and the community had to balance the danger of spreading the virus and the need to keep producing food.

In 2021 she was the Minister for Sport, Culture and the Arts, Fisheries and Co-operatives. The People's Republic of China's government had donated eight containers of materials in 2020 and their team of eight people were maintaining the Kirani James Athletics Stadium in 2021. In 2022 she announced that the restrictions due to COVID-19 were being relaxed. She allowed a blended approach to the important Spicemas festival. In that year her party became the party of the opposition as they lost the election.
