= Anthony Boatswain =

Grenadian politician

Minister of Finance of Grenada
- In office November 1999 – 2007
- Prime Minister: Keith Mitchell
- Preceded by: Keith Mitchell
- Succeeded by: Keith Mitchell

Personal details
- Party: New National Party

Anthony Boatswain is a politician from Grenada. A former member and treasurer of the New National Party (NNP), he served for a time in the office of prime minister Keith Mitchell. He served as Minister of Finance, Trade, Industry and Planning (1999-2007), Minister for Economic Development and Planning, Trade and Industry (2007-2008), Minister of Education; Human Resource Development (2013-2017) and Minister of Sports (2017-2022).

Boatswain has economics degree from Long Island University, New York. He was elected to the House of Representatives of Grenada four times between 1999 and 2018 from St. Patrick West constituency. He was appointed to the Senate of Grenada in 2010. In October 2019 he was elected as chairman of the NNP. He retired from frontline politics in 2022.

Political offices
Preceded by Keith Mitchell	Minister of Finance of Grenada; 1999 – 2007	Succeeded by Keith Mitchell
