= Franklyn Harvey =

Grenadian academic and activist (1943–2016)

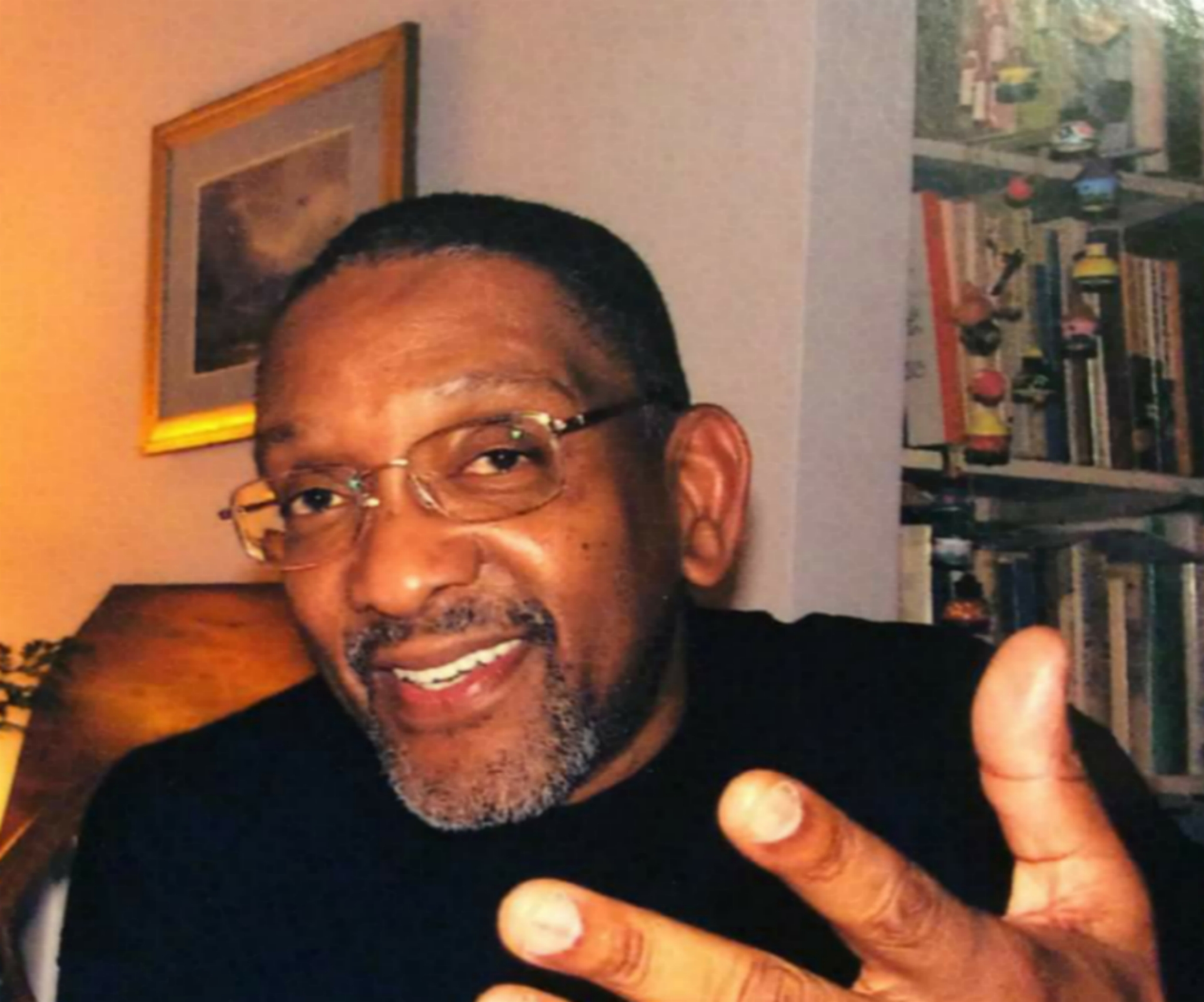
- Born: 14 February 1943; St Andrew's, Grenada
- Died: 16 May 2016 (aged 73); Ottawa, Canada
- Education: Presentation College; University of London; McGill University
- Occupations: Academic and activist
- Known for: A founder of the New Jewel Movement

Franklyn Harvey (14 February 1943 – 16 May 2016) was a Grenadian academic, activist and professional, a founder of the New Jewel Movement (NJM) and principal author of their manifesto. He had a significant influence on the development of the Caribbean new left throughout the 1960s and 1970s and later, in the animation of hundreds of municipal and community projects all around the world. When the NJM took over the government of Grenada on 13 March 1979, Harvey's contributions to their manifesto began to take concrete form across the island.

== Biography ==
Harvey was born in St Andrew's, Grenada, on 14 February 1943. He graduated from Presentation College in St. Georges, Grenada, received a B.Sc. in engineering from the University of London in 1964 and a master's degree in Environmental Science from McGill University in 1968.

While studying at McGill for his master's degree, he was part of the C.L.R. James Study Circle and the Caribbean Conference Committee, along with Robert Hill, Alphonso (Alfie) Roberts, Tim Hector, and (now) Canadian Senator Anne Cools – a group that formed the basis of the new Caribbean Left. In 1968, Harvey was one of the key influences behind the C.L.R. James Study Circle and the October 1968 Montreal Black Writers Conference. Back in Trinidad after graduating from McGill, he began to put C. L. R. James's theory into practice as, among many other activities, a founding member of the populist based, bottom-up New Beginning Movement in Trinidad and part of the Grenadian leadership of the Movement for Assemblies of the People (MAP), which ultimately became part of the New Jewel Movement (NJM). Harvey, as a founding member, was one of the critical links between Trinidad's New Beginning Movement and the Movement for the Assemblies of the People (MAP), one of the constituent organizations of Grenada’s New Jewel Movement.

Harvey was the primary author of "The Manifesto of the New Jewel Movement", the basic programme of the NJM when it took over the Government of Grenada on 13 March 1979.

His professional working career began as Senior Researcher in Housing & Planning at the Faculty of Engineering, University of the West Indies (UWI), Trinidad, from 1968 to 1972, followed by the position of Coordinator of the UN Model Development Project in Trinidad from 1969 to 1971.

Returning to Toronto, Canada, in 1974, he worked as Programme Manager in the Planning & Development Department of the City of Toronto from 1974 to the mid-1980s, ultimately as its director. Throughout this period he was involved in many grassroots initiatives as the Editor of Caribbean Dialogue including Caribbean Connection and the Latin American Working Group (LAWG). In 1986, he founded and became the principal in Participlan, a consulting company that supported consultation and planning in the NGO world – carrying out extensive work with Canadian and international NGOs, including Amnesty International, the Federation of Canadian Municipalities and Oxfam Canada. His community consulting work took him throughout the world (Guyana, the Caribbean, Pakistan, Indonesia, Sri Lanka, and he participated in many regional events that took place in Vietnam, Cambodia, Thailand, Nepal, Philippines). In 1997, he founded Caribbean Self-Reliance International (CASRI), an NGO working with partner organizations in the Caribbean in initiatives resulting in real change in people’s lives and promoting community transformation.

He died in Ottawa, Canada, on 16 May 2016.

== Publications ==
- The Rise and Fall of Party Politics in Trinidad & Tobago, February 1974, New Beginning Movement, Toronto.
- Editorial: Reality and Perspective, Caribbean Dialogue, Vol. 1, No. 1, August–September 1975.
- The Optimization of concrete beams with reliability constraints, 1968, McGill University, Dissertation Department of Civil Engineering.
