= Chrysler Thomas =

Grenadian politician

Member of Parliament for Saint Patrick East
- In office December 1976 – March 1979
- Preceded by: Constituency created

Personal details
- Born: 12 September 1934 (age 91) Mt. Rose, British Windward Islands
- Died: 11 February 2013 (aged 78) New York City, United States
- Party: Grenada United Labour Party

Chrysler Thomas (September 12, 1934 – February 11, 2013) was a Grenadian politician. Thomas served as a member of the Parliament of Grenada representing the Saint Patrick East constituency from December 1976 until the overthrow of the government by the New Jewel Movement on March 13, 1979. He also served as the Ministry of Agriculture while a member of the House of Representatives of Grenada.

Thomas was born as the oldest of three children on September 12, 1934, in Mt. Rose, Saint Patrick Parish, Grenada. He married his wife, Agatha Wells, on Trinidad against the will of his parents the marriage produced had four children. His wife, Agatha, died in 1973 and he married his second wife, Lydia Jack, with whom he had two children.

Thomas was arrested and imprisoned by the People's Revolutionary Government (PRC), led by Maurice Bishop, on March 15, 1979, two days after the revolution. He was held as a political prisoner by the PRC for nearly two years. He fled to the United States following his release from prison. He joined his wife, Lydia, in New York City's borough of Brooklyn, where she had moved after his arrest. Thomas found employment as a security officer at John F. Kennedy International Airport in Queens, New York.

Thomas died in New York City on February 11, 2013, at the age of 78.
