= David E. Andrew =

Grenadian politician

David Andrew

Minister of Finance of Grenada
- Incumbent
- Assumed office 16 November 2026
- Prime Minister: Dickon Mitchell
- Preceded by: Dennis Cornwall

Personal details
- Party: National Democratic Congress

David Evlyn Andrew is a Grenadian politician from the National Democratic Congress currently serving as MP for St. Andrew South East after the 2026 elections.

Andrew has a teacher's certificate from University of the West Indies. He worked as a teacher and later in the ministry of education.

Andrew was appointed as Minister of Education and a senator in the Senate in June 2022. In the 2026 elections he unseated the Leader of the Opposition in St. Andrew South East, and he was appointed as the Minister of Finance and Economic Planning after the elections.
