= Saint Patrick East (Grenada) =

Coordinates: 12°12′21.12″N 61°38′32.10″W

Saint Patrick East Constituency
- Constituency
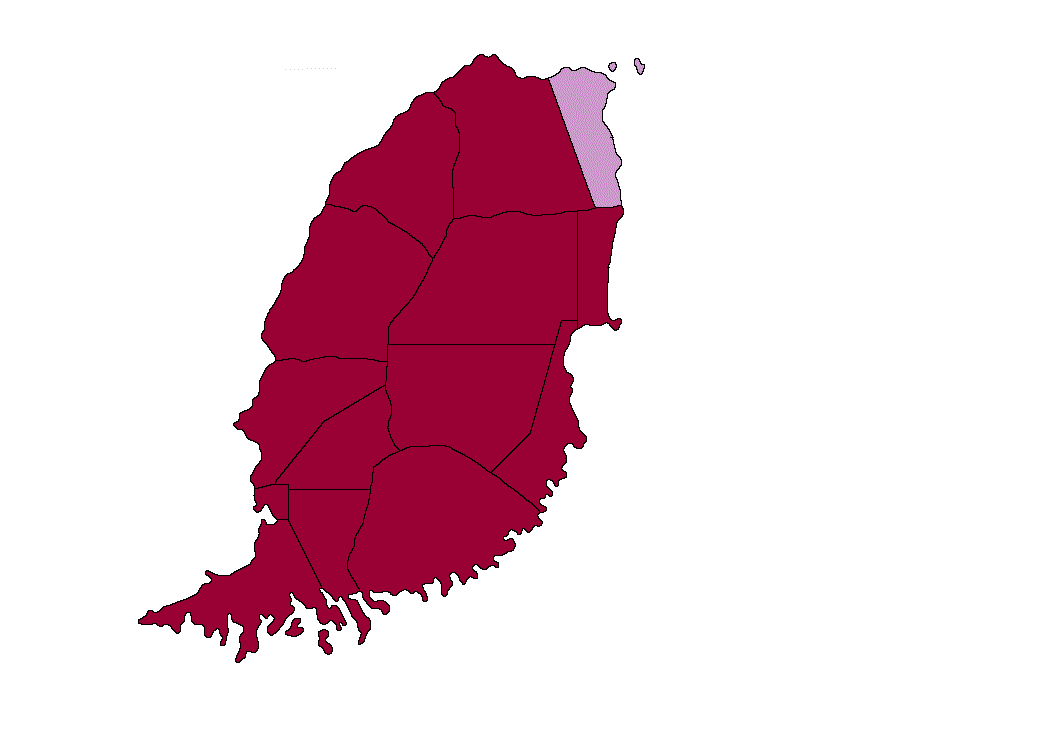
- Country: Grenada
- Parish: St Patrick
- MP: Dennis Cornwall
- Capital City: Sauteurs

Saint Patrick East is a constituency in Grenada.

== Members of Parliament ==
Year	Winner	Party
1976-1979	Chrysler Thomas	Grenada United Labour Party
1984-1990	Tillman Thomas	New National Party
1990-1995	Winston E. Frederick	Grenada United Labour Party
1995-2003	Adrian F. Mitchell	New National Party
2003-2013	Tillman Thomas	National Democratic Congress
2013-2022	Clifton Paul	New National Party
2022-	Dennis Cornwall	National Democratic Congress

== Election results ==
=== 2022 ===
Candidate	Party	Votes	%
Dennis Matthew-Cornwall	NDC	1,443	51.85
Pamela Moses	NNP	1,322	47.50
Nigel John	GULP	18	0.65
Total		2,783	100.00
Registered voters/turnout		3,914	–
NDC gain from NNP			
