= Dennis Cornwall =

Minister of Finance of Grenada
- In office 28 April 2023 – 16 November 2026
- Prime Minister: Dickon Mitchell
- Preceded by: Dickon Mitchell
- Succeeded by: David E. Andrew

Personal details
- Party: National Democratic Congress

Dennis Cornwall is a Grenadian politician from the National Democratic Congress currently serving as MP for St. Patrick East.

== Career ==
Cornwall has an economist degree from University of Pinar del Rio, Cuba. He was Deputy Director-General for Budget and Fiscal Policy in the Ministry of Finance. Cornwall was also Manager of Research and Marketing with the Home Mortgage Bank of the Eastern Caribbean Central Bank (ECCB) in St. Kitts.

Cornwall was appointed Minister of Infrastructure and Physical Development, Civil Aviation and Transportation on 1 July 2022 and served until 28 April 2023 when he was appointed Minister of Finance. After the 2026 elections, he was given the portfolio of Minister of National Security.
