= Alphonso Theodore Roberts =

West Indian cricketer

Alphonso Roberts
Cricket information
- Batting: Right-handed

International information
- National side: West Indies
- Only Test: 9 March 1956 v New Zealand

Career statistics
Competition	Test	First-class
Matches	1	7
Runs scored	28	153
Batting average	14.00	13.90
100s/50s	0/0	0/0
Top score	28	45
Catches/stumpings	0/–	3/–
- Source: CricInfo, 4 May 2025

Alphonso (Alfie) Theodore Roberts (18 September 1937 – 24 July 1996) was a Vincentian political activist and cricketer.

== Early years ==
Born in Saint Vincent and the Grenadines on 18 September 1937, Roberts attended St. George's Anglican School and then St. Vincent Boy's Grammar School. While at the Grammar School, Roberts excelled in both soccer and cricket and, upon the recommendation of cricket great Sir Everton Weekes, he was awarded a scholarship to Queen's Royal College in Trinidad and Tobago. It was during this period that he was selected to play for the West Indies cricket team. Along with Sir Everton Weekes and the legendary Gary Sobers, he toured New Zealand with the West Indies team in 1955–56. He was only 18 years of age, one of the youngest ever to play international cricket.

Alfie Roberts' interest in education and politics took precedence over sport and by 1961 he was no longer playing competitive cricket. Between 1958 and 1962, he worked as a civil servant for the government of St. Vincent before emigrating to Canada to attend Sir George Williams University (now Concordia University) in Montreal.

== Montreal and the Conference Committee ==
In 1965, Roberts teamed up with Robert Hill, Hugh O'Neale, Alvin Johnson, Franklyn Harvey, Anne Cools, and Rosie Douglas, among others, to organise the first of a series of conferences and events that would bring a host of distinguished Caribbean thinkers and writers to Montreal, including novelist George Lamming and C. L. R. James, one of the great thinkers of the last century. These events nourished a number of important political movements across the Caribbean. Out of this Montreal-based group, the Conference Committee on West Indian Affairs, evolved several other groups based in Montreal, including the International Caribbean Service Bureau and the Emancipation 150 Committee. These groups played a major role in highlighting social and political issues facing communities of African and Caribbean descent locally and internationally.

As an advocate for the downtrodden and dispossessed, Alfie Roberts' work brought him to various countries in Africa – Tanzania, Ghana, Uganda, Libya; to Cuba, Martinique, and many other countries across the Caribbean; and Europe and the former Soviet Union. He also helped to develop cricket, netball, carnival, and several foundational Black community institutions in Montreal, many of which continue to enrich the Montreal community.

Among the many groups and organisations that Roberts helped to establish during his 34 years in Canada is the St. Vincent and Grenadines Association of Montreal. In fact, despite his many international commitments, he remained committed to his native St. Vincent and the Grenadines and it was he who, on the eve of the country's independence, submitted a detailed policy statement to the government of St. Vincent outlining why the Grenadines should be included as an integral part of the country's name. The crux of his argument was that the Grenadines should not be seen as mere appendages of the island of St. Vincent and that the integrity of all of the smaller islands should be respected. His submission was adopted by the government, hence the name St. Vincent and the Grenadines.

A voluminous reader who possessed a remarkably analytical mind, a vivid memory, and an insatiable appetite for learning, Roberts was also a teacher who served as an advisor and resource to many – including several prime ministers in the Caribbean. He died on 24 July 1996, in Montreal, Quebec, Canada, aged 58.

== Legacy: The Alfie Roberts Institute ==
Named after Roberts, The Alfie Roberts Institute is an independent non-governmental organisation based in Montreal, Quebec, Canada, founded in 2001. The Alfie Roberts Institute expands upon his life work, and is home to a large collection of print and media materials primarily concerning Africa, the Caribbean, and their peoples.

In June 2005 The Alfie Roberts Institute launched its first publication, a book called A View For Freedom: Alfie Roberts Speaks on the Caribbean, Cricket, Montreal, and C.L.R. James. The book is based on an extensive interview with Alfie Roberts conducted by David Austin in January 1995, over a year before Roberts died.
