= 2003 Grenadian general election =

- 27 November 2003

All 15 seats in the House of Representatives 8 seats needed for a majority
- Registered: 82,278
- Turnout: 57.72% (▲1.18pp)
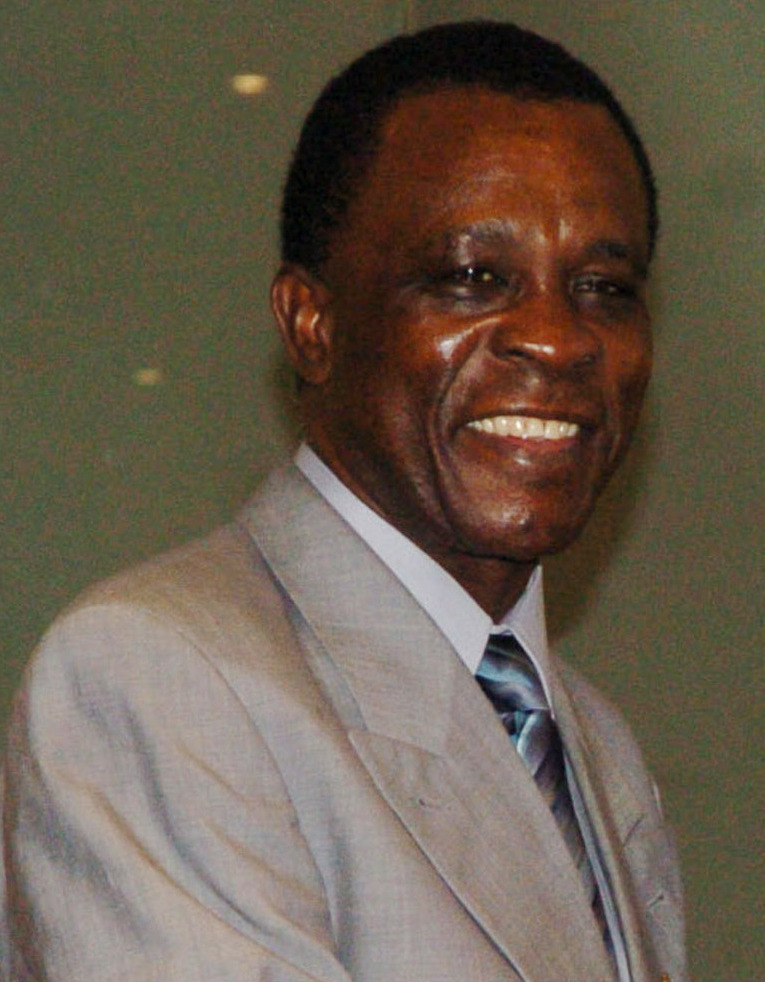

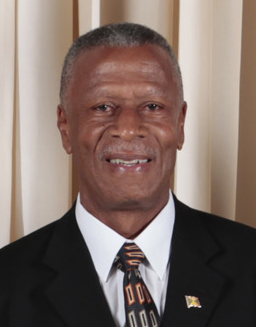
	First party	Second party
Leader	Keith Mitchell	Tillman Thomas
Party	NNP	NDC
Last election	62.47%, 15 seats	25.08%, 0 seats
Seats won	8	7
Seat change	▼7	▲7
Popular vote	22,566	21,445
Percentage	47.77%	45.40%
Swing	▼14.70pp	▲20.32pp
- Winning party by constituency
Prime Minister before election
Keith Mitchell
NNP
Elected Prime Minister
Keith Mitchell
NNP

General elections were held in Grenada on 27 November 2003. The New National Party government of Prime Minister Keith Mitchell won a third consecutive term with a reduced majority. Voter turnout was 57.7%.

== Results ==
Party	Votes	%	Seats	+/–
New National Party	22,566	47.77	8	–7
National Democratic Congress	21,445	45.40	7	+7
Grenada United Labour Party	2,243	4.75	0	0
People's Labour Movement	933	1.98	0	New
Good Old Democratic Party	10	0.02	0	0
Grenada Renaissance Party	6	0.01	0	New
Independents	36	0.08	0	0
Total	47,239	100.00	15	0
Valid votes	47,239	99.48		
Invalid/blank votes	249	0.52		
Total votes	47,488	100.00		
Registered voters/turnout	82,278	57.72		
Source: Nohlen
