= Saint Andrew North West (Grenada) =

Saint Andrew North West Constituency
- Constituency
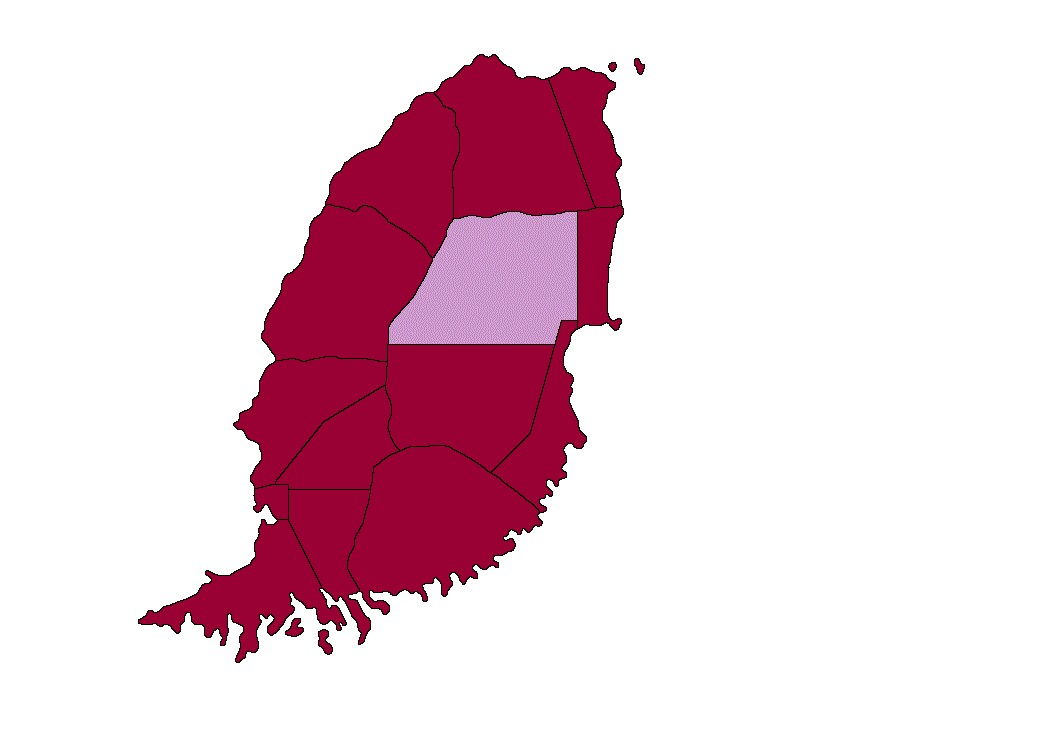
- Country: Grenada
- Parish: St Andrew
- Constituency Minister: Alleyne Walker
- Capital City: La Fillete

Saint Andrew North West is a parliamentary constituency of Grenada.

== Members ==
Year	Winner	Party
1984–1990	Alleyne Walker	Grenada National Party
1990–1995	Alleyne Walker	The National Party
1995–2003	Laurina A. Waldron	New National Party
2003–	Alleyne Walker	National Democratic Congress

== Election results ==
=== 2022 ===
Candidate	Party	Votes	%
Delma Thomas	NNP	1,898	51.79
Gloria Thomas	NDC	1,767	48.21
Total		3,665	100.00
Registered voters/turnout		4,798	–
NNP hold			
