= Grenada Renaissance Party =

- Abbreviation: GRP
- Leader: Martin Edwards
- Founder: Martin Edwards
- Founded: 2003
- House of Representatives: 0 / 15
- Senate: 0 / 13

The Grenada Renaissance Party is a political party in Grenada. It contested the 2003 general elections, but received only six votes and failed to win a seat. It also ran three candidates in the 2013 general election receiving 20 votes.

== Election results ==
=== House of Representatives ===
Election	Party leader	Votes	%	Seats	+/–	Position	Status
2003	Martin Edwards	6	0.01%	0 / 15	New	6th	Extra-parliamentary
2008	Did not run						Extra-parliamentary
2013	Martin Edwards	20	0.04%	0 / 15	Steady	▲5th	Extra-parliamentary
2018	Martin Edwards	44	0.08%	0 / 15	Steady	5th	Extra-parliamentary
2022	Martin Edwards	30	0.05%	0 / 15	Steady	5th	Extra-parliamentary
2026	Martin Edwards	4	0.01%	0 / 15	Steady	▼8th	Extra-parliamentary
