= Elvin Nimrod =

The Honourable Elvin G. Nimrod
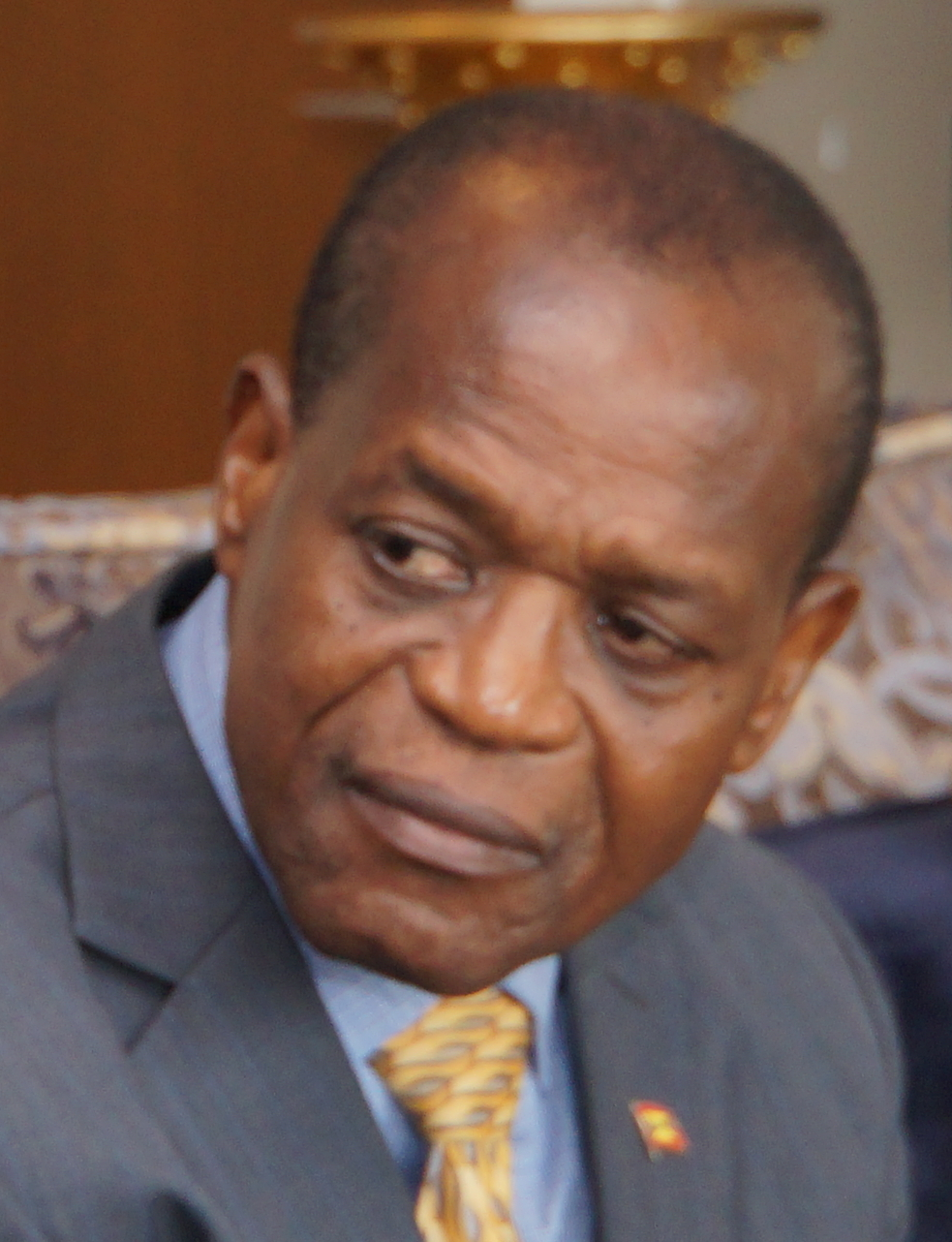

Deputy Prime Minister of Grenada
- In office March 2013 – 2018
- Leader: Keith Mitchell

Minister of Carriacou and Petit Martinique Affairs
- In office 14 January 1999 – 9 July 2008
- Leader: Keith Mitchell
- Succeeded by: George Prime

Member of Parliament for Carriacou and Petite Martinique
- In office 14 January 1999 – 2018
- Preceded by: Joan Purcell
- Succeeded by: Kindra B. Maturine-Stewart

Personal details
- Born: 27 August 1943 Carriacou
- Died: 6 February 2021 (aged 77)
- Party: NNP
- Spouse: Donzell T. Nimrod
- Education: New York Law School John Jay College of Criminal Justice Brooklyn College
- Occupation: Politician
- Profession: Attorney at Law

Elvin G. Nimrod (27 August 1943 – 6 February 2021) was a politician from the island of Carriacou. He served in the House of Representatives of Grenada as Parliamentary Representative for Carriacou and Petite Martinique, and has in the past served as Deputy Prime Minister, and Minister of Foreign Affairs, International Trade, Legal Affairs, Labour, Local Government, Carriacou and Petite Martinique Affairs and Attorney General.

Nimrod attended the Hillsborough Government School in Carriacou, then later the Grenada Boys Secondary School.

Elvin later migrated to the United States, where he attended Brooklyn College, receiving a Bachelor of Science degree in political science. He then attended the John Jay College of Criminal Justice, where he obtained a Master of Arts degree in criminal justice. He culminated his academic pursuits by attending New York Law School, where he obtained a Juris Doctor (JD) degree.

After a number of years practising law in New York and Grenada, he entered the Grenada political arena in 1997, when he became a member of the Senate. Two years later, in 1999, he was elected on a New National Party ticket, becoming the Parliamentary Representative for Carriacou and Petite Martinique—a designation he held until his retirement from frontline politics just before the 2018 general elections in Grenada. In March 2013 he was appointed Deputy Prime Minister of Grenada.

== See also ==
- List of foreign ministers in 2017
