= Emmalin Pierre =

Grenadian politician (born 1975)

The Honourable Emmalin Pierre MP
- Pierre in 2026

Leader of the Opposition
- In office 4 March 2025 – 17 November 2026
- Monarch: Charles III
- Prime Minister: Dickon Mitchell
- Preceded by: Keith Mitchell
- Succeeded by: Adrian Joseph

Leader of the New National Party
- Incumbent
- Assumed office 15 December 2024
- Deputy: Norlan Cox
- Preceded by: Keith Mitchell

Member of Parliament for Saint Andrew South East
- In office 20 February 2013 – 2 October 2026
- Preceded by: Patrick Simmons
- Succeeded by: David E. Andrew

Personal details
- Born: August 23, 1975 (age 51) Birch Grove, Grenada
- Party: New National
- Children: 2
- Education: Edinburgh Napier University (MBA)

Emmalin Pierre (born 23 August 1975) is a Grenadian politician who has been the Leader of the Opposition in the House of Representatives between 2025 and 2026, and leader of the New National Party since 2024. She was a member of the house between 2013 and 2026, and was appointed to the Senate in 2003.

== Early life and education ==
Emmalin Pierre was born in Birch Grove, Grenada, on 23 August 1975. She was the head prefect at St. Andrew's Anglican Secondary School. She graduated from Edinburgh Napier University with a Master of Business Administration.

== Career ==
Pierre was a teacher for eight years. She was the host of two radio programmes for youths and was the host of the TV programme Youth Vibes. She was vice president of the Regional Youth Forum of the Commonwealth Youth Programme. In 2003, she monitored elections in Nigeria.

Pierre was appointed to the Senate at age 28 in 2003. She was the Minister for Youth Development. In the 2013 election she was elected to the House of Representatives representing the Saint Andrew South East constituency. She served as acting Prime Minister from 14 June to 15 June 2019, while Keith Mitchell was absent. As of 2025, she is the youngest currently serving member of the house.

Mitchell stepped down as leader of the NNP after holding the position since 1989. Pierre was selected to replace him on 15 December 2024, and was the first woman to lead a political party in Grenada. She succeeded Mitchell as Leader of the Opposition on 4 March 2025, and was the second woman to hold that position, with Winifred Strachan being the first.

Pierre lost her seat in the 2026 general election, where NNP suffered a major defeat.

== Personal life ==
Pierre is married to Tafawa Pierre, who is the younger brother of Michael Pierre. She is the mother of two children.

== Works cited ==
=== News ===
- "Emmalin Pierre: A New Era of Leadership Ignites Unwavering Support in St. George" (PDF). The Grenada Informer. 28 February 2025.
- "Emmalin Pierre officially appointed Grenada's opposition leader". Virgin Islands News Online. 5 March 2025. Archived from the original on 3 July 2025.
- "Hon. Emmalin Pierre is Acting Prime Minister". Now Grenada. 14 June 2019. Archived from the original on 3 July 2025.
- Straker, Linda (15 December 2024). "Emmalin Pierre declared NNP Political Leader". Now Grenada. Archived from the original on 3 July 2025.

=== Web ===
- "Grenada". Inter-Parliamentary Union. Archived from the original on 3 July 2025.
- "Profile of Emmalin Pierre Our Candidate for the Constituency of St. Andrew South East". New National Party. Archived from the original on 22 September 2008.
