= Gregory Bowen =

Deputy Prime Minister of Grenada
- In office December 2003 – July 2008
- Prime Minister: Keith Mitchell
- Preceded by: Grace Duncan
- Succeeded by: Nazim Burke

Minister of Finance of Grenada
- In office 2020–2022
- Prime Minister: Keith Mitchell
- Preceded by: Keith Mitchell
- Succeeded by: Dickon Mitchell

Personal details
- Party: New National Party

Gregory Clarence Bowen is Grenadian politician, former cabinet minister and Deputy Prime Minister of Grenada.

Bowen is an electrical engineer by profession. He has an engineering degree from University of the West Indies and worked in Grenada Electricity Services. Bowen has been a senior member of New National Party (NNP) during the leadership of Keith Mitchell. In 1995 he was appointed to the Senate of Grenada, and appointed as Minister for Communications, Works, Public Utilities and Transportation. In 1999 he received additional portfolio of Minister of Energy. He was appointed Deputy Prime Minister of Grenada from December 2003 until the election loss in 2008.

Bowen was a long-time deputy leader of New National Party from 1993 onwards. After the retirement of Elvin Nimrod, Bowen was deputizing the Prime Minister until the election loss in 2022. He was also Minister of Finance of Grenada from October 2020 to 2022. He lost his seat in the House of Representatives in the elections of 2022.
