= Good Old Democratic Party =

The Good Old Democratic Party (GOD), also known as Good Old Democracy, is a minor political party in Grenada founded and led by Justin Francis McBurnie. It first contested parliamentary elections in 1990, when it received only six votes for McBurnie, its sole candidate, and failed to win a seat.

McBurnie died on 19 January 2021.

== Election results ==
Election	Leader	Votes	%	Seats	+/–	Position	Result
1990	Justin Francis McBurnie	6	0.02%	0 / 15	Steady	▲6th	Extra-parliamentary
1995	Justin Francis McBurnie	16	0.04%	0 / 15	Steady	▼7th	Extra-parliamentary
1999	Justin Francis McBurnie	12	0.03%	0 / 15	Steady	▲5th	Extra-parliamentary
2003	Justin Francis McBurnie	10	0.02%	0 / 15	Steady	5th	Extra-parliamentary
2008	Justin Francis McBurnie	Did not run (Note: McBurnie ran as an independent candidate in 2008 using his middle name, Francis McBurnie. He received three votes.)					Extra-parliamentary
2013	Justin Francis McBurnie	14	0.03%	0 / 15	Steady	▲6th	Extra-parliamentary
2018	Justin Francis McBurnie	Did not run (Note: McBurnie needed six registered voters to sign his nomination form, but could only collect three.)					Extra-parliamentary
Source: Caribbean Elections
