= People's Labour Movement =

Political party in Grenada (1995–2008)

- Abbreviation: PLM
- Leader: Francis Alexis; Terence Marryshow
- Founded: 1995
- Dissolved: 2008
- Split from: National Democratic Congress
- Ideology: Democratic socialism; Labourism; Left-wing populism; Progressivism; Secularism; Social democracy
- Political position: Left-wing to centre-left
- National affiliation: United Labour Platform (2008)

The People's Labour Movement (PLM) was a political party in Grenada founded by Francis Alexis. It became defunct after the 2008 elections.

== History ==
The PLM was founded as the Democratic Labour Party in December 1995 by four former members of the National Democratic Congress. At the time of its dissolution, it was one of the oldest political parties in Grenada, along with the Grenada United Labour Party. The organization was created by the former Attorney General Francis Alexis. In the late 1990s, Alexis left the party to work on his political issues. In 2002, the party merged with the Maurice Bishop Patriotic Movement. In the 2003 elections the party received 2% of the popular vote but failed to win a seat. For the July 2008 elections, it formed a coalition with its longtime rival the Grenada United Labour Party; the combined United Labour Platform fielded 11 candidates for the 15 seats, receiving just 0.8% of the vote and again failing to win a seat. The party became defunct after the elections.
