= Deputy Prime Minister of Grenada =

Government role in Grenada

- Coat of arms of Grenada
- Style: The Honourable
- Member of: Cabinet
- Reports to: Prime Minister
- Appointer: Prime Minister
- Formation: 1974
- First holder: Herbert Preudhomme

Deputy Prime Minister of Grenada is the deputy head of government of Grenada. Nobody holds the position currently. Deputy Prime Minister can be appointed by the Governor-General on the advice of Prime Minister. No automatic succession from deputy prime ministership is defined.

== Deputy Prime Ministers ==
Name	Took office	Left office	Prime Minister	Ref
Herbert Preudhomme	1974	13 March 1979	Eric Gairy	
Bernard Coard	1979	14 October 1983	Maurice Bishop	
Liam James "Owusu"	October 1983	October 1983	Bernard Coard	
Allen Kirton	December 1983	December 1984	Nicholas Brathwaite	
Ben Jones	December 1984	December 1989	Herbert Blaize	
Ben Jones	March 1990	January 1991	Nicholas Brathwaite	
Grace Duncan	September 1995	July 1997	Keith Mitchell	
Gregory Bowen	2003	2008	Keith Mitchell	
Nazim Burke	2008	2013	Tillman Thomas	Unofficial
Elvin Nimrod	March 2013	2018	Keith Mitchell	
Gregory Bowen	2021	June 2022	Keith Mitchell	Unofficial
