= List of speakers of the House of Representatives of Grenada =

List of speakers of the House of Representatives of Grenada.

== Speaker of the Legislative Council ==
Name	Took office	Left office	Notes
Fisher Jellicoe Archibald	1963	1966	

== Speaker of the House of Assembly ==
Name	Took office	Left office	Notes
Fisher Jellicoe Archibald	1966	1967	

== Speakers of the House of Representatives ==
Name	Took office	Left office	Notes
Hon. George E. D. Clyne	1967	1973	
Hon. R. C. P. Moore	1973	June 1976	
Hon. Allison Reason	July 1976	1979	
In abeyance	1979	1984	
Hon. Hudson Scipio	1984	February 1990	
Hon. Marcel Peters	April 1990	June 1995	
Hon. Sir Curtis Strachan	1995	1 January 2003	
Hon. George McGuire	17 January 2003	29 October 2003	
Hon. Sir Lawrence Albert Joseph	9 January 2004	3 June 2008	
Hon. George McGuire	30 August 2008	9 January 2013	
Hon. Michael Pierre	27 March 2013	31 August 2022	
Hon. Leo Cato	31 August 2022	Present	
