= Grenada Democratic Movement =

The Grenada Democratic Movement (GDM), chaired by Dr. Francis Alexis, emerged in May 1983 as an alliance of various exile groups opposed to the Maurice Bishop regime. The group was founded by Roy McBain in Brooklyn, New York. Centrist in ideology, its members comprise a large number of university-educated Grenadians, including several former supporters of the People's Revolutionary Government who became disenchanted with its Marxist-Leninist orientation. The GDM merged with two other parties in 1987 to form the New National Party.
