= George Prime =

Grenadian politician

The Honourable George Wilbert Prime

Minister of Carriacou and Petit Martinique Affairs
- In office 9 July 2008 – 19 February 2013
- Prime Minister: Tillman Thomas
- Preceded by: Elvin Nimrod
- Succeeded by: Elvin Nimrod

Personal details
- Born: 30 May 1953 (age 73) Aruba
- Party: NDC
- Children: 2
- Education: University of London

George Prime is an attorney-at-law and former magistrate and politician from the island of Grenada. He served as that nation's Minister of Carriacou and Petit Martinique Affairs between 2008 and 2013.

He was suspended from the Bar in 2021 for 6 months and jailed in September 2025.
