= Maurice Bishop Patriotic Movement =

Socialist political party in Grenada

- Abbreviation: MBPM
- Leader: George Louison; Kendrick Radix
- Founded: 1983; 42 years ago
- Dissolved: 2002; 23 years ago
- Preceded by: New JEWEL Movement
- Succeeded by: People's Labour Movement
- Ideology: Communism; Marxism; Socialism
- Political position: Far-left

The Maurice Bishop Patriotic Movement (MBPM) was a socialist political party in Grenada. It was established by George Louison and Kendrick Radix, supporters of executed Prime Minister Maurice Bishop, after the US invasion of Grenada. However, despite the popularity of the revolution with many Grenadians, the MBPM was a marginal force in the island's politics. In the 1984 elections it received only 5% of the vote and failed to win a seat. In the 1990 elections its vote share dropped to 2.4%, falling to 1.6% in 1995 and 0.6% in 1999. The party's last leader, Terrence Marryshow, merged the MBPM with another left-wing party in 2002, creating the People's Labour Movement.
