= 2018 Grenadian general election =

- 13 March 2018

All 15 seats in the House of Representatives 8 seats needed for a majority
- Registered: 78,294
- Turnout: 73.61% (▼14.97pp)
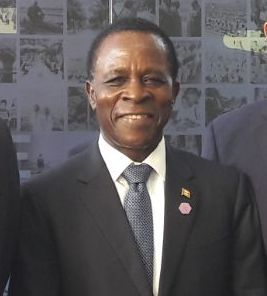

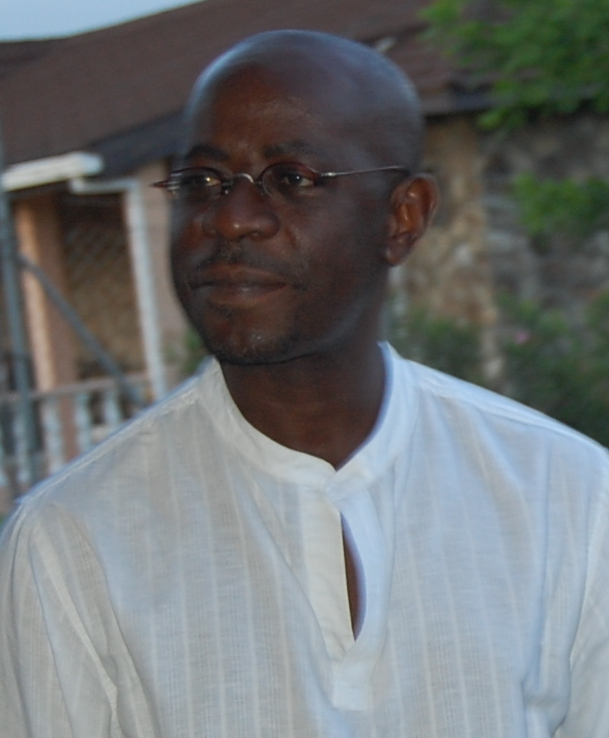
| | First party | Second party |
|---|---|---|
| Leader | Keith Mitchell | Nazim Burke |
| Party | NNP | NDC |
| Last election | 58.71%, 15 seats | 40.79%, 0 seats |
| Seats won | 15 | 0 |
| Seat change | Steady | Steady |
| Popular vote | 33,786 | 23,249 |
| Percentage | 58.91% | 40.53% |
| Swing | ▲0.20pp | ▼0.26pp |
- Results by constituency
Prime Minister before election
Keith Mitchell
NNP
Elected Prime Minister
Keith Mitchell
NNP

General elections were held in Grenada on 13 March 2018. The result was a victory for the New National Party and incumbent Prime Minister Keith Mitchell, winning his fifth term in office.

== Electoral system ==
The 15 members of the House of Representatives are elected by first-past-the-post voting in single-member constituencies.

== Results ==
| Party | Votes | % | Seats | +/– |
|---|---|---|---|---|
| New National Party | 33,792 | 58.91 | 15 | 0 |
| National Democratic Congress | 23,249 | 40.53 | 0 | 0 |
| Grenada Progressive Movement | 86 | 0.15 | 0 | New |
| The Liberal Party | 49 | 0.09 | 0 | New |
| Grenada Renaissance Party | 44 | 0.08 | 0 | 0 |
| The Progress Party | 41 | 0.07 | 0 | New |
| Grenada Empowerment Movement | 25 | 0.04 | 0 | New |
| Grenada United Patriotic Movement | 10 | 0.02 | 0 | 0 |
| Independents | 68 | 0.12 | 0 | 0 |
| Total | 57,364 | 100.00 | 15 | 0 |
| Valid votes | 57,364 | 99.54 | | |
| Invalid/blank votes | 267 | 0.46 | | |
| Total votes | 57,631 | 100.00 | | |
| Registered voters/turnout | 78,294 | 73.61 | | |
Source: Caribbean Elections
