= Grenada Federated Labour Party =

The Grenada Federated Labour Party was a political party in Grenada. It contested the 1984 general elections, but received only ten votes and failed to win a seat. It did not run in any further elections.
