= 1925 Grenadian general election =

General elections in Grenada held in February 1925

General elections were held in Grenada in February 1925.

== Background ==
A Representative Government Association was formed in 1917, which called for the introduction of elected members in the Legislative Council and the abolition of the crown colony system in place since 1877. This was achieved with a new constitution of 1925.

== Electoral system ==
The Legislative Council consisted of 16 members; the Governor (who served as president of the council), seven 'official' members (civil servants), three appointed members and five elected members. Voting was restricted to men aged 21 or over and women aged 30 or over who had resided in Grenada for at least two years and either had an income of at least £30 per year, owned property valued at £150 or more, or rented property for at least £12 per annum. Candidacy was restricted to qualified male voters with a minimum annual income of £200 and who either had lived in their constituency for at least a year, or owned property in the constituency worth at least £500.

From a total population of 70,184, only 2,159 people were eligible to vote.

== Results ==
Three constituencies – St David's – South St George's, St George's and St John's – St Mark's, had only one candidate, who was elected unopposed. Although the Representative Government Association had proposed nominating candidates, it was defunct by late 1924 and all candidates ran as independents.

Constituency	Member
St Andrew's	Charles H.W.G. Lucas
St David's – South St George's	Charles Renwick
St George's	T.A. Marryshow
St John's – St Mark's	Donald McIntyre
St Patrick's and Carriacou	Fitz Henry Copland
Source: Emmanuel

The Colonial Secretary, Attorney General, Chief Medical Officer, Director of Education, Treasurer, Superintendent of Agriculture and Superintendent of Public Works were appointed as the official members.

== Aftermath ==
The newly elected Legislative Council met for the first time in March.
