= 1984 Grenadian general election =

General elections in Grenada held on 3 December 1984

- 3 December 1984

All 15 seats in the House of Representatives 8 seats needed for a majority
- Registered: 48,158
- Turnout: 86.19% (▲21.00pp)
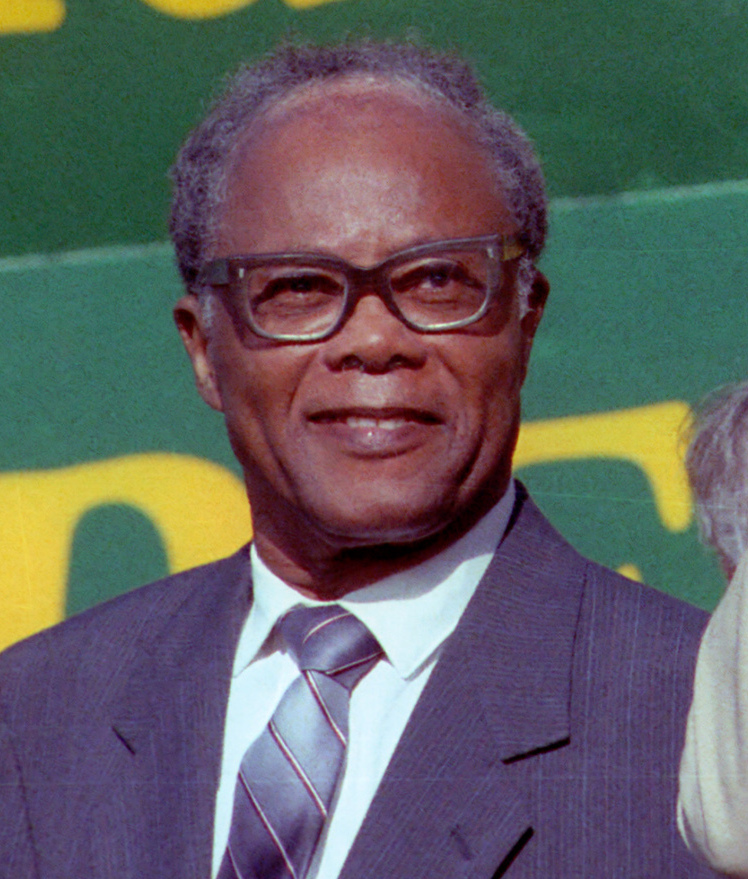

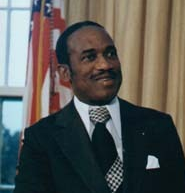
	First party	Second party
Leader	Herbert Blaize	Eric Gairy
Party	NNP	GULP
Last election	13.74%, 1 seat	51.74%, 9 seats
Seats won	14	1
Seat change	▲13	▼8
Popular vote	24,045	14,721
Percentage	58.61%	35.88%
Swing	▲44.87pp	▼15.86pp
- Winning party by constituency
Prime Minister before election
Nicholas Brathwaite
Non-partisan
Elected Prime Minister
Herbert Blaize
NNP

General elections were held in Grenada on 3 December 1984, the first after the U.S.-led invasion that followed two coups. The result was a victory for the New National Party, which won 14 of the 15 seats. Voter turnout was 86%.

== Results ==
Party	Votes	%	Seats	+/–
New National Party	24,045	58.61	14	New
Grenada United Labour Party	14,721	35.88	1	–8
Maurice Bishop Patriotic Movement	2,039	4.97	0	New
Christian Democratic Labour Party	104	0.25	0	New
Grenada Federated Labour Party	10	0.02	0	New
Independents	104	0.25	0	0
Total	41,023	100.00	15	0
Valid votes	41,023	98.84		
Invalid/blank votes	483	1.16		
Total votes	41,506	100.00		
Registered voters/turnout	48,158	86.19		
Source: Nohlen
