= Presentation Brothers College (Grenada) =

Coordinates: 12.0546°N 61.7520°W

PBC Grenada
- Old Fort Road; Grenada

Information
- Type: Public
- Motto: Virtus et Scientia (Virtue and Knowledge)
- Religious affiliation: Roman Catholic
- Established: 1947
- Principal: Mr Marvin Phillip
- Gender: Men
- Color: Dark Green And white
- Website: www.pbcgnd.org

Presentation Brothers' College is a prominent Roman Catholic secondary school for boys in St. George's, Grenada. It was founded by the Presentation Brothers in 1948.

== Notable alumni ==
- Maurice Bishop
- Keith Mitchell
- George Brizan
- Dickon Mitchell
