= Adrian Thomas =

Adrian Thomas may refer to:

- Adrian Thomas (composer), composer and professor of music at Cardiff University School of Music
- Adrian P. Thomas, American victim of miscarriage of justice
- Adrian Thomas (zoologist) (born 1963), British professor of zoology at Oxford University
