= Franka Bernardine =

Grenadian politician

The Honourable Franka Alexis-Bernardine

Leader of the National Democratic Congress
- In office 3 November 2019 – 31 October 2021
- Preceded by: Joseph Andall (acting)
- Succeeded by: Dickon Mitchell

National Democratic Congress Senator for the House of Senate
- In office 9 July 2018 – 27 May 2020

Minister for Education and Human Resource Development
- In office 9 July 2008 – 19 February 2013
- Prime Minister: Tillman Thomas

Personal details
- Born: Grenada, British Windward Islands
- Party: National Democratic Congress
- Children: 5
- Education: University of the West Indies, Mona; University College of London

Franka Bernadine is a politician from the island of Grenada.

She served in the Senate of Grenada and as Grenada's Minister of Education and Human Resources from 2008. From 3 November 2019 until 31 October 2021 she was the Leader of the National Democratic Congress (Grenada).
