= Clarice Modeste-Curwen =

Grenadian politician

Clarice Modeste-Curwen is a politician and educator from Grenada.

She was appointed member of the Senate of Grenada in 1998. She is a member of the New National Party, and has served in the Parliament of Grenada since 1999.

She was Minister of Health from 1999 to 2004, then Minister of Works from 2004 to 2007 and Minister of Tourism since 2007.
