= Roland Bhola =

Grenadian politician

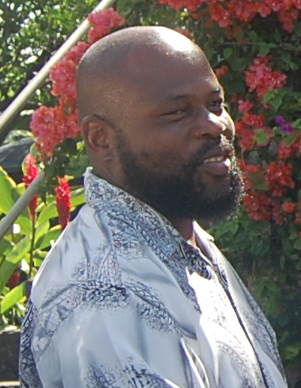
Bhola in 2012

Roland Bhola (born 5 September 1967) is a politician from Grenada. He has served in the Senate of Grenada, and has been the island's Minister of Sport on multiple occasions. He is a member of the New National Party.
