= Francis Alexis =

Grenadian politician

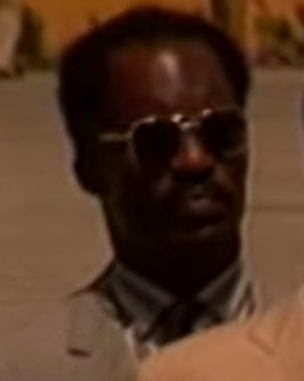

Francis Alexis is a Grenadian politician and lawyer, currently serves as president of the Grenada Bar Association. He was also the leader of the Democratic Labour Party (DLP).

Francis Alexis was born 3 October 1947, in Grenada. He was admitted to practice before the High Court of Justice in Grenada on December 10, 1980, having earned his LLM (1976), LLB (1973) and BA (1971) from the University of the West Indies (UWI), Cave Hill, Barbados. Alexis also holds a PhD in Public Law (1980) from the University of Cambridge, England and an LEC (1977) from Hugh Wooding Law School, Trinidad and Tobago. Alexis obtained his secondary education, 1962–68, from the Grenada Boys Secondary School, Grenada. Alexis was appointed Queen’s Counsel in the Eastern Caribbean on August 7, 2008. Alexis is a practising Catholic. He has been married to Margaret Alexis née De Bique since 1973. He is the father of three and grandfather of one.

Alexis has been active in Grenadian politics since 1983; while in exile in Barbados during Maurice Bishop's People's Revolutionary Government (PRG), he founded the Grenada Democratic Movement (GDM) as an alliance of various exile groups opposed to the PRG. The GDM later merged with the Grenada National Party (led by Herbert Blaize) and the National Democratic Party (led by George Brizan) in August 1984 to create the New National Party (NNP).

Alexis was Minister of Labour from 1984 to 1987. In 1987, Alexis, along with George Brizan, broke with the NNP to form the National Democratic Congress (NDC). He subsequently broke with the NDC, and has since founded the Democratic Labor Party (DLP) and the People's Labour Movement (PLM). He was Attorney General of Grenada in 1987, and since 1990. He was acting prime minister in 1990.
