= St Patrick's and Carriacou =

St Patrick's and Carriacou constituency
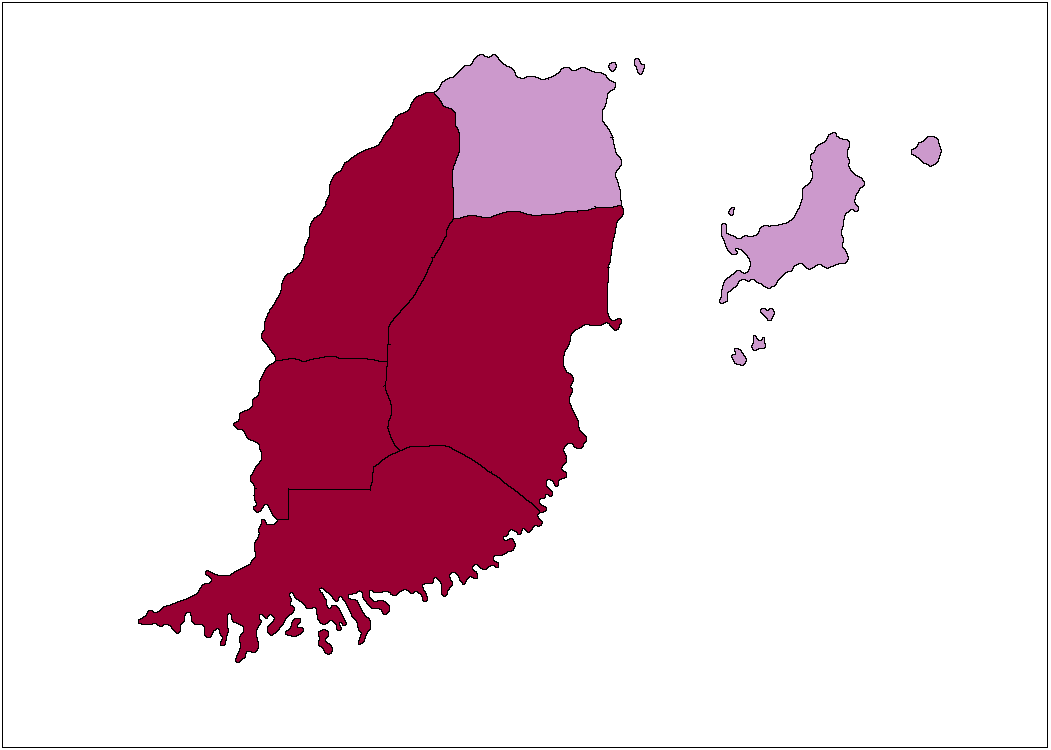
- Country: Grenada
- Former Constituency: St Patrick's and Carriacou
- constituency Minister: No-One
- Capital City: Sauteurs
- Constituency Year: 1924-Wednesday 15 May 1935

St Patrick's and Carriacou is a former parliamentary constituency in Grenada. It was established in 1924 and dissolved in 1935.

== Member of Parliament ==
Term	Member
1925–1931	Fitz Henry Copland
1931–1935	Frederick B. Paterson

== See also ==
- Member of Parliament of Carriacou and Petite Martinique
- Member of Parliament of St Patrick
