= Patrick Simmons (politician) =

Patrick Simmons is a politician from the island of Grenada. He previously served as that nation's Minister of Youth Empowerment, Culture and Sports.
