= Dickon Mitchell =

Prime Minister of Grenada since 2022

The Honourable Dickon Mitchell MP
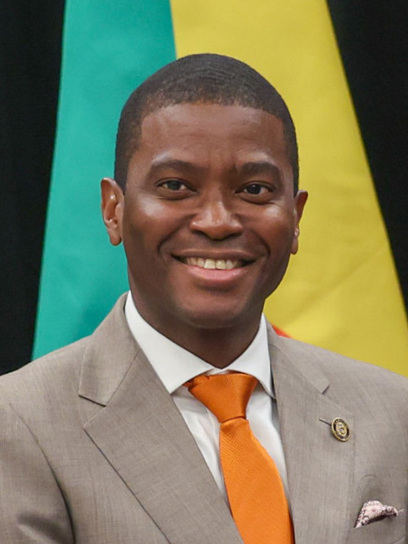
- Mitchell in 2024

Prime Minister of Grenada
- Incumbent
- Assumed office 24 June 2022
- Monarchs: Elizabeth II; Charles III
- Governor-General: Cécile La Grenade
- Preceded by: Keith Mitchell

Leader of the National Democratic Congress
- Incumbent
- Assumed office 31 October 2021
- Preceded by: Franka Bernardine

Member of Parliament for St. David
- Incumbent
- Assumed office 23 June 2022
- Preceded by: Oliver Joseph
- Majority: 1,654 (23.06%)

Chairman of the Caribbean Community
- In office 1 July 2024 – 31 December 2024
- Preceded by: Irfaan Ali
- Succeeded by: Mia Mottley

Personal details
- Born: 8 October 1977 (age 49) Saint David Parish, Grenada
- Party: National Democratic Congress
- Children: 2
- Education: Presentation Brothers College; University of the West Indies

Dickon Amiss Thomas Mitchell (born 8 October 1977) is a Grenadian politician and attorney serving as the prime minister of Grenada since 24 June 2022 and the leader of the National Democratic Congress (NDC) since 2021. He led his party to victory in the 2022 general election and was re-elected in the 2026 general election.

== Early life and law career ==
Mitchell was born on 8 October 1977 in Petit Esperance, Saint David, Grenada. He received an LLB (Hons) from the University of the West Indies at Cave Hill, and completed his Legal Education Certificate at Hugh Wooding Law School in 2002.

After graduation, he worked as an Associate Attorney-at-Law at the firm Grant, Joseph & Co. He founded his own firm Mitchell & Co. in 2017.

== Political career ==
Mitchell was elected leader of the National Democratic Congress party on 31 October 2021.

=== Prime Minister of Grenada ===
Mitchell's National Democratic Congress won the 2022 general election with slightly over 51% of the popular vote and winning nine out of the fifteen available seats.

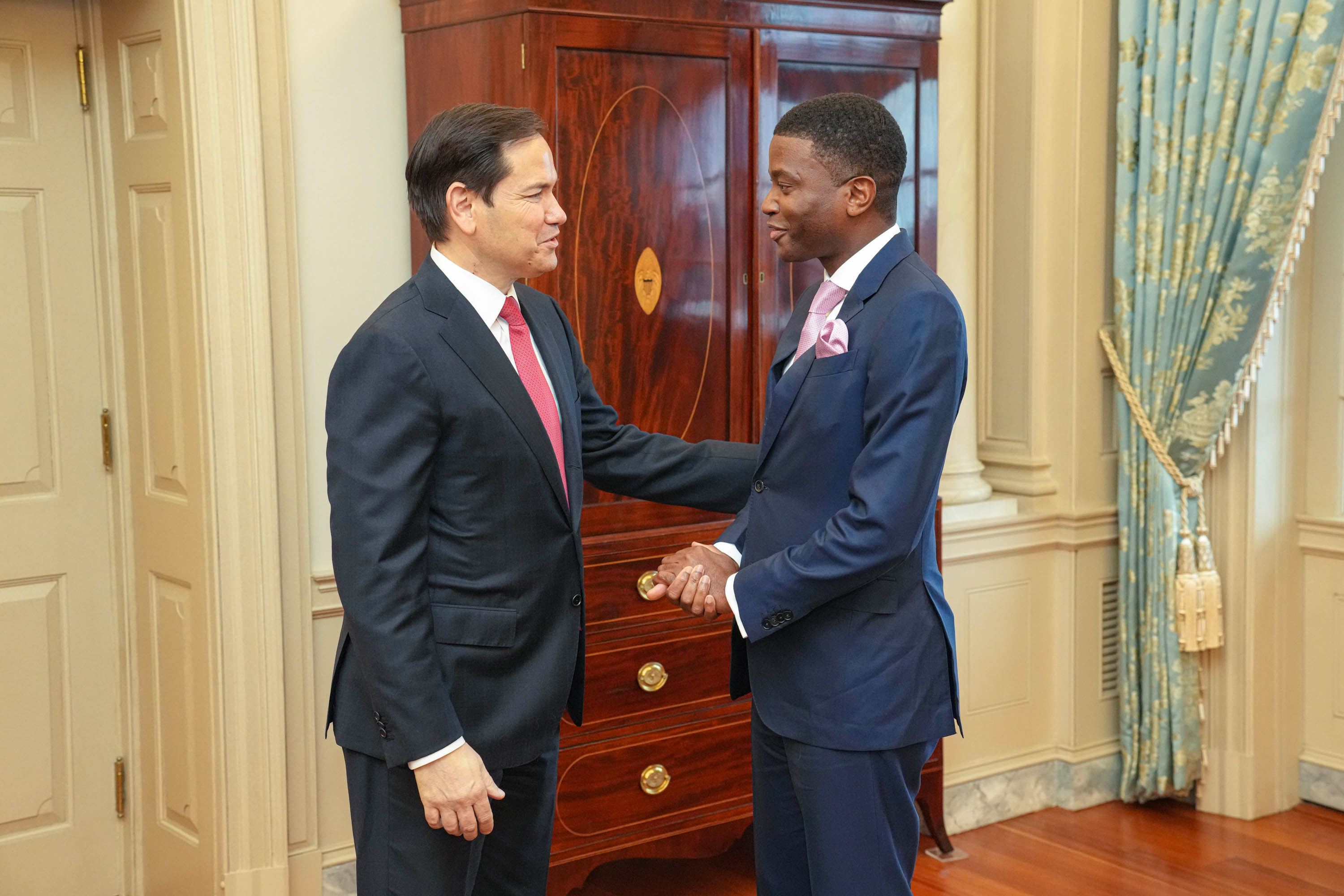
Mitchell with United States secretary of state Marco Rubio, in 2025

Mitchell reacted to the election victory by announcing that he would ask the governor-general, Dame Cécile La Grenade, to declare 24 June a national public or bank holiday so that "citizens can celebrate the liberation day and the victory that they have created for Grenada, Carriacou and Petite Martinique".

On 24 June, Mitchell was sworn in as the ninth prime minister of Grenada, succeeding Keith Mitchell (no relation). He pledged to end nepotism in the Grenadian society and reform the electoral system. He took the additional portfolio of Minister of Finance of Grenada and created a new Ministry called the Ministry of Mobilization, Implementation and Transformation. During his speech at the swearing-in of Ministers ceremony, he promised to pay teachers their withheld salaries.

A supporter of Grenada becoming a republic, Mitchell announced on May 4, 2023, that he hopes to see his country become one during his administration. On August 8, 2025, Mitchell supported a move by the House of Representatives to drop the oath of allegiance to the British crown and to instead swear to the Grenadian nation, which passed unanimously and was given royal ascent by governor-general Cécile La Grenade. He also stated “What is it about King Charles that is superior to me, that requires me not to swear allegiance to the people of Grenada but to him?” Members within his own party such as tourism and culture minister Adrian Thomas have pushed him to go further and rename the royal prison and Royal Grenada Police Force and to further pursue "decolonising our society."

Mitchell supports the British government to pay reparations to Grenada due to slavery, forming the Grenada Reparations Commission and directly demanding reparations from King Charles which he refused.

Party political offices
Preceded by Franka Bernardine	Leader of the National Democratic Congress; 2021–present	Incumbent
Assembly seats
Preceded by Oliver Joseph	Member of Parliament for St. David; 2022–present	Incumbent
Political offices
Preceded by Keith Mitchell	Prime Minister of Grenada; 2022–present	Incumbent
Preceded by Gregory Bowen	Minister of Finance of Grenada; 2022–2023	Succeeded by Dennis Cornwall
