= Keith Mitchell =

Prime Minister of Grenada (1995–2008, 2013–2022)

The Right Honourable Keith Mitchell MP PC
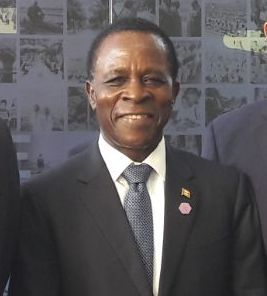
- Mitchell in 2021

Prime Minister of Grenada
- In office 20 February 2013 – 24 June 2022
- Monarch: Elizabeth II
- Governors-General: Sir Carlyle Glean; Dame Cécile La Grenade
- Deputy: Elvin Nimrod (2013-2018)
- Preceded by: Tillman Thomas
- Succeeded by: Dickon Mitchell
- In office 22 June 1995 – 9 July 2008
- Monarch: Elizabeth II
- Governors-General: Sir Reginald Palmer; Sir Daniel Williams
- Deputy: Grace Duncan (1995-1997); Gregory Bowen (2003-2008)
- Preceded by: George Brizan
- Succeeded by: Tillman Thomas

Leader of the New National Party
- In office 18 January 1989 – 15 December 2024
- Preceded by: Herbert Blaize
- Succeeded by: Emmalin Pierre

Leader of the Opposition
- In office 4 July 2022 – 21 February 2025
- Monarchs: Elizabeth II; Charles III
- Prime Minister: Dickon Mitchell
- Preceded by: Tobias Clement
- Succeeded by: Emmalin Pierre
- In office 9 July 2008 – 20 February 2013
- Monarch: Elizabeth II
- Prime Minister: Tillman Thomas
- Preceded by: Tillman Thomas
- Succeeded by: Vacant; Tobias Clement (in 2020)

Member of Parliament for St. George North West
- In office 3 December 1984 – 2 October 2026
- Preceded by: George Hosten
- Succeeded by: Adrian Joseph
- Majority: 2,500 (71.61%)

Personal details
- Born: Keith Claudius Mitchell; 12 November 1946 (age 79) Brizan, Grenada
- Party: New National Party
- Spouse: Marietta Mitchell
- Children: Olinga Mitchell
- Education: University of the West Indies; Howard University; American University; Presentation Brothers' College

Keith Claudius Mitchell (born 12 November 1946) is a Grenadian politician who served as Prime Minister of Grenada from 1995 to 2008 and from 2013 to 2022. He is the longest-serving prime minister in Grenadian history, holding the office for more than 22 years. He was leader of the New National Party (NNP) from 1989 until 2024 and has been the Leader of the Opposition in the House of Representatives of Grenada from 2008 to 2013, and again from 2022 to 2025.

== Education and personal life ==
Keith Claudius Mitchell was born in the community of Brizan, Saint George. Mitchell graduated from The University of the West Indies with a Bachelor of Science degree in mathematics and chemistry in 1971. He gained a master's degree from Howard University in 1975 and a doctorate in mathematics and statistics from American University in 1979. He then worked as a statistician at Applied Management Sciences, providing statistical support to the U.S. Energy Information Administration. In 1984, Mitchell gave up his professional activities to return home to Grenada after the U.S. invasion.

== Cricket career ==
Mitchell was a cricketer, a spin bowler who captained the Grenada team in 1973. He has since been a prominent cricket administrator in the West Indies alongside his political career.

== Political career ==
In the December 1984 general election, Mitchell was elected to a seat in the House of Representatives from St. George North West constituency and he has held the seat in each subsequent election. Mitchell was elected as leader of the NNP in January 1989, defeating Prime Minister Herbert Blaize. Blaize then dismissed Mitchell from his position as Minister of Communications and Works on 21 July 1989.

After the NNP was victorious in the general election held on 20 June 1995, winning eight out of 15 seats in the House of Representatives, Mitchell took office as prime minister, along with his Cabinet, on 22 June. Under Mitchell's leadership, the party won all 15 seats in the early election held in January 1999, and the NNP narrowly won a third term in power in the November 2003 election, reduced to a one-seat parliamentary majority. Mitchell held the additional portfolio of Minister of Finance for three periods.

The New National Party was defeated in the general election held on 8 July 2008 by the National Democratic Congress (NDC), winning only four seats against 11 for the NDC. Mitchell himself was re-elected to his seat from St. George North West. NDC leader Tillman Thomas succeeded Mitchell as prime minister on 9 July. Mitchell said that the people voted for change and congratulated Thomas. Following the election, he continued as NNP leader and was sworn in as Leader of the Opposition on 16 July 2008.

In the February 2013 general election, the NNP again won all 15 parliamentary seats. After this resounding victory, Mitchell was sworn in as prime minister on 20 February 2013. Looking ahead to the next election, Mitchell predicted that his party could win all 15 seats in parliament for a third time. Mitchell and his New National Party created history by retaining all 15 seats in the Grenada General Election of 13 March 2018. It is the first time any political party regionally or otherwise has achieved such a feat. Mitchell held the additional portfolio of minister of finance until 2020.

In June 2022, Mitchell called a snap general election. His New National Party was defeated by the National Democratic Congress under Dickon Mitchell (no relation), winning just 6 seats to the NDC's 9. Mitchell subsequently became Leader of the Opposition in the House of Representatives of Grenada. Ahead of the 2024 national convention of the NNP, Mitchell announced that he would not seek re-election as leader, stepping back after over 35 years in the role. He was succeeded as leader by Emmalin Pierre. Mitchell subsequently resigned as Leader of the Opposition on 21 February 2025, recommending Pierre as his successor.

== Foreign policy ==
In 1997, Mitchell became the first prime minister since Maurice Bishop to visit Cuba, signing an economic cooperation agreement. He re-established relations with the People's Republic of China in 2005.

Mitchell approved 1996 plans by the United States Coast Guard to build a base on Petite Martinique. He allowed medical visits from USNS Comfort (T-AH-20).

== Honours and awards ==
Recipient of the Order of José Martí of Cuba.

Political offices
| Preceded by George Brizan | Prime Minister of Grenada; 1995–2008 | Succeeded by Tillman Thomas |
| Preceded by Michael Andrew (politician) | Minister of Finance of Grenada; 1995–1997 | Succeeded by Patrick Bubb |
| Preceded by Patrick Bubb | Minister of Finance of Grenada; 1999 | Succeeded by Anthony Boatswain |
| Preceded by Anthony Boatswain | Minister of Finance of Grenada; 2007–2008 | Succeeded by Nazim Burke |
| Preceded by Tillman Thomas | Leader of the Opposition; 2008–2013 | Succeeded by Tobias Clement |
| Preceded by Tillman Thomas | Prime Minister of Grenada; 2013–2022 | Succeeded by Dickon Mitchell |
| Preceded by Nazim Burke | Minister of Finance of Grenada; 2013–2020 | Succeeded by Gregory Bowen |
| Preceded by Tobias Clement | Leader of the Opposition; 2022–present | Incumbent |
Party political offices
| Preceded by Herbert Blaize | Leader of the New National Party; 1989–2024 | Succeeded by Emmalin Pierre |
