= House of Representatives (Grenada) =

Lower house of the legislature of Grenada

Coordinates: 12.05384°N 61.74536°W

- 11th Parliament

Type
- Type: Lower House of the Parliament of Grenada

History
- Founded: 1967

Leadership
- Speaker: Leo Cato since 31 August 2022
- Prime Minister: Dickon Mitchell, NDC since 24 June 2022
- Leader of the Opposition: Adrian Joseph, NNP since 17 November 2026

Structure
- Seats: 16
- Political groups: Outgoing legislature His Majesty's Government (10): National Democratic Congress (10); His Majesty's Opposition (4): New National Party (4); Other opposition (1): Democratic People's Movement (1); Presiding Officer: Speaker (1)
- Political groups: Incoming legislature His Majesty's Government (14): NDC (14); His Majesty's Opposition (1): NNP (1); Presiding Officer: Speaker (1)

Elections
- Voting system: First-past-the-post
- First election: February 1925 (as Legislative Council)
- Last election: 5 November 2026
- Next election: By 2030

Meeting place
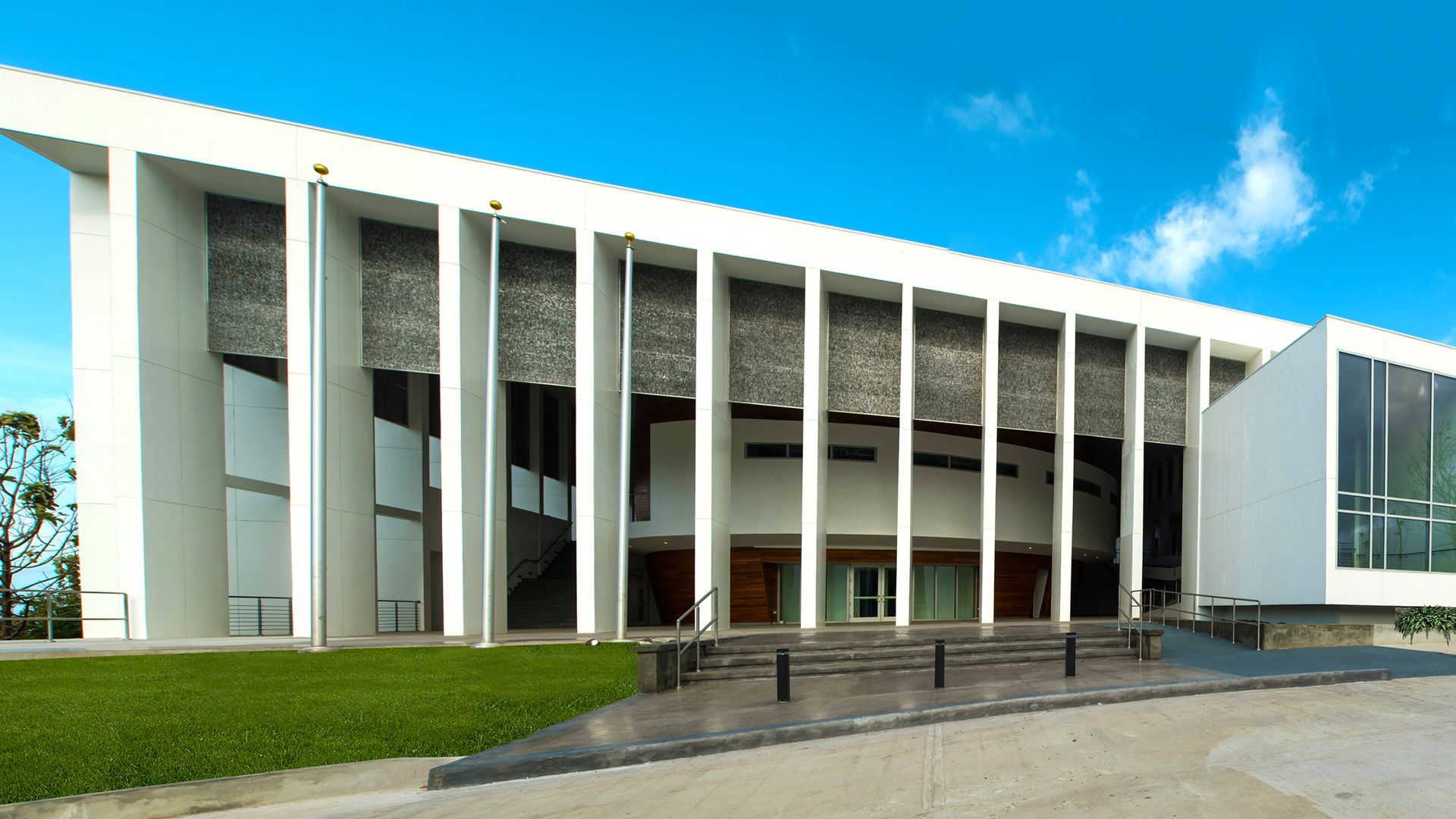
- New Houses of Parliament; Parliament Hill - Mt. Wheldale; St. George's; Grenada

Website
- grenadaparliament.gd

The House of Representatives of Grenada is the lower chamber of the country's bicameral parliament. Together with the upper chamber, the Senate, it meets in the New Houses of Parliament in the capital St. George's.

The House of Representatives has a total of 16 members. 15 are directly elected to five-year terms from single member constituencies using the first-past-the-post system. Final seat is held by the Speaker of the House, who is not an elected member, but sits ex officio following their election to the post by the 15 elected members.

== Roles ==
=== Relationship with the government ===
Although the House of Representatives does not formally elect the prime minister, under the provisions of the constitution the prime minister is answerable to the House, and therefore must maintain the support of a majority of its members. In this way, the position of the parties in the House is an overriding importance. Thus, whenever the office of prime minister falls vacant, the governor-general appoints the person who has the support of the house, or who is most likely to command the support of the house. This being normally the leader of the largest party in the house, while the leader of the second-largest party becomes the leader of the Opposition.

The House may at any time indicate its lack of confidence in the government by passing a motion of no confidence. When a government has lost the confidence of the House, the prime minister is expected either to resign, making way for another MP who can command confidence, or advise the governor-general to dissolve Parliament, thereby precipitating a general election. A prime minister who does not resign or advise a dissolution within 3 days after a successful no confidence vote will be dismissed from office by the governor-general.

The constitution sets the term of Parliament as five years. The prime minister can, however, choose to at any earlier time advise the governor-general to dissolve Parliament.

=== Legislative functions ===
Bills may be introduced in either house of Parliament, though bills of importance generally originate in the House of Representatives. The supremacy of the House is ensured by its sole responsibility of maintaining confidence in the government and being the only chamber where money bills can be introduced.

== History ==
The House of Representatives has its origins in the colonial-era House of Assembly, which was the elected lower house of the General Assembly established by Royal Proclamation of George III in 1766. The House of Assembly was replaced by a wholly apppinted Legislative Council during the period of Crown Colony rule after 1877. Reforms to the Legislative Council reintroduced elections in 1925, when 5 elected seats were introduced onto the 16-member council.

The modern House of Representatives came into being in 1967 when Grenada achieved full internal self-government as an Associated State of the United Kingdom. Largely modelled on the British House of Commons, the chamber remained mostly unchanged following the grant of full independence in 1974.

=== Meeting place ===
The House of Representatives currently meets in the Parliament chamber at the New Houses of Parliament, which was completed in 2018. Prior to this, the House had met in the Grenada Trade Centre since 2004, following the destruction of York House, which had housed the House of Representatives and its predecessors since 1801.

== Members of the House of Representatives ==
=== 2022 to present ===
Political Party	Member	Constituency
NDC	Honourable Dickon Mitchell – Prime Minister	St. David
NDC	Honourable Philip Telesford - Leader of Government Business	St. George South East
NDC	Honourable Lennox Andrews	St. Andrew South West
NDC	Honourable Andy Williams	St. George South
NDC	Honourable Tevin Andrews	Carriacou and Petite Martinique
NDC	Honourable Ron Redhead	St. George North East
NDC	Honourable Kerryne James	St. John
NDC	Honourable Dennis Cornwall	St. Patrick East
NDC	Honourable Joseph Andall	St. Patrick West
NDC	Honourable Delma Thomas	St. Andrew North West
NNP	Dr The Right Honourable Keith Mitchell	St. George North West
NNP	Honourable Emmalin Pierre - Leader of His Majesty's Opposition	St. Andrew South East
NNP	Honourable Clarice Modeste-Curwen - Deputy Speaker of the House	St. Mark
NNP	Honourable Kate Lewis	St. Andrew North East
DPM	Honourable Peter David	Town of St. George
Speaker	Honourable Leo Cato	None (Speaker of the House of Representatives)

== See also ==
- Senate of Grenada – the upper chamber of Parliament
- History of Grenada
- List of national legislatures
- List of speakers of the House of Representatives of Grenada
