= National Democratic Congress (Grenada) =

- Abbreviation: NDC
- Leader: Dickon Mitchell
- Chairperson: Tevin Andrews
- Founders: George Brizan; Francis Alexis
- Founded: 18 October 1987; 39 years ago
- Split from: New National Party
- Youth wing: National Democratic Youth Movement
- Ideology: Social democracy Social liberalism Republicanism; Progressivism
- Political position: Centre-left
- International affiliation: Progressive Alliance
- Colors: red, gold and green
- House of Representatives: 10 / 15
- Senate: 7 / 13

Website
- www.ndcgrenada.org

The National Democratic Congress (Note: officially known as the National Democratic Congress of Grenada, Carriacou and Petite Martinique) (NDC) is a social democratic and centre-left political party in Grenada. It is the governing party in Grenada, having won a majority in the 2022 general elections. The party is led by current prime minister Dickon Mitchell as of October 2021.

== History ==
The party was founded in 1987 by George Brizan and Francis Alexis, as a party opposed to the New National Party government that came to power in the 1984 elections after the United States invasion of Grenada. It won the 1990 elections, with Nicholas Brathwaite becoming prime minister. It lost power to the NNP in the 1995 elections, which were held shortly after Brathwaite's resignation. The NDC was thereafter in opposition for 13 years. It failed to win any seats in the 1999 elections, but only narrowly lost the 2003 elections, in which it won 45.6% of the popular vote and seven of the 15 seats.

In the July 2008 general election, the NDC won 11 out of 15 seats, and party leader Tillman Thomas became prime minister. Despite a 40% vote share in the 2013 election, the party lost all its seats to the New National Party under Keith Mitchell, which obtained all 15 seats.

The NDC was affiliated to the former Central American liberal organisation FELICA (the Federation of Liberal Parties of Central America and the Caribbean), also known as the Federación de Partidos Liberales de Centroamérica y el Caribe. The party maintains close links with the other center-left political parties in the English-speaking Caribbean such as the Democratic Labour Party in Barbados.

== Political leaders of the National Democratic Congress ==
Leader	Took office	Left office
George Brizan	1987	1989
Nicholas Brathwaite	1989	4 September 1994
George Brizan	4 September 1994	1999
Joan Purcell	1999	2000
Tillman Thomas	2000	2 February 2014
Nazim Burke	2 February 2014	1 July 2018
Joseph Andall (interim)	1 July 2018	3 November 2019
Franka Bernardine	3 November 2019	31 October 2021
Dickon Mitchell	31 October 2021	incumbent

== Election results ==
=== House of Representatives elections ===
Election	Party leader	Votes	%	Seats	+/–	Position	Result
1990	Nicholas Brathwaite	13,637	34.5%	7 / 15	▲7	▲1st	Minority government
1995	George Brizan	13,372	30.6%	5 / 15	▼2	▼2nd	Opposition
1999	George Brizan	10,396	25.1%	0 / 15	▼5	2nd	Extra-parliamentary
2003	Tillman Thomas	21,445	45.4%	7 / 15	▲7	2nd	Opposition
2008	Tillman Thomas	29,007	51.2%	11 / 15	▲4	▲1st	Supermajority government
2013	Tillman Thomas	22,377	40.6%	0 / 15	▼11	▼2nd	Opposition (Note: In the 2013 elections the NDC lost all its seats in the House of Representatives. However, the Governor-General considered the NDC to be the main opposition and appointed three of the party defeated candidates (Nazim Burke, Franka Bernardine and George Vincent) to the Senate.)
2018	Nazim Burke	23,243	40.5%	0 / 15	Steady	2nd	Extra-parliamentary
2022	Dickon Mitchell	31,398	51.8%	9 / 15	▲9	▲1st	Majority government
2026	Dickon Mitchell	37,373	61.0%	14 / 15	▲5	1st	Supermajority government
