= New National Party (Grenada) =

- Abbreviation: NNP
- Leader: Emmalin Pierre
- Chairperson: Keith Mitchell
- General Secretary: Roland Bhola
- Governing body: General Council
- Founded: August 26, 1984
- Merger of: GNP, GDM, NDP
- Headquarters: Tempe, St George
- Youth wing: New National Party Youth (NNPYouth)
- Ideology: Conservatism; Economic liberalism Factions: Republicanism
- Political position: Centre-right
- Regional affiliation: Caribbean Democrat Union
- International affiliation: International Democracy Union
- Colours: Green
- Slogan: "Working in unity for our nations prosperity."
- House of Representatives: 1 / 15
- Senate: 3 / 13

Website
- www.subscribetonnp.org

The New National Party (Note: officially known as New National Party Grenada, Carriacou and Petite Martinique) (NNP) is a conservative political party in Grenada. It is led by Emmalin Pierre. The party is sometimes referred to as "the House", or the "Green Party" in reference to its logo.

The party was founded in August 1984 through the merger of the Grenada National Party, led by Herbert Blaize, the National Democratic Party, led by George Brizan, and the Grenada Democratic Movement (GDM), led by Francis Alexis. Led by Blaize, the NNP won 14 out of 15 seats in the December 1984 general election, and Blaize became prime minister. Mitchell was elected as leader of the NNP in January 1989, defeating Prime Minister Herbert Blaize. In the 1990 general election, the NNP won two seats and was left in opposition.

The party was victorious in the 1995 general election, winning eight out of 15 seats in the House of Representatives, and Mitchell became prime minister. After the NNP lost its majority due to the resignation of Raphael Fletcher, the Minister of Foreign Affairs, in November 1998, an early election was called for January 1999, the New National Party (NNP) won all seats. The NNP narrowly won a third term in power in the November 2003 election, reduced to a one-seat parliamentary majority.

In the general election held on 27 November 2003, the party won 48.0% of the popular vote and 8 out of 15 seats. In the July 2008 general election, the party lost to the National Democratic Congress (NDC), winning four seats against 11 for the NDC. NDC leader Tillman Thomas succeeded Mitchell as Prime Minister of Grenada.

In the 2013 general election, the New National Party returned to power, after winning all 15 seats. This was the second time a political party won all constituencies in a general election. At the 2018 General Election, the New National Party was able to retain all 15 seats. In November 2021, Prime Minister Keith Mitchell said that the upcoming general elections which are constitutionally due no later than June 2023, will be the last one for him. Early elections were held in June 2022 and Mitchell ultimately led the party to defeat.

The New National Party (NNP) convention held on Sunday, December 15, elected the party's first female political leader. Emmalin Pierre served as a public relations professional before being elected to political leader. Norland Cox was elected deputy political leader.

At the 2026 general election the NNP suffered its worst defeat in its history, being reduced to a single seat, Saint George North West, with Emmalin Pierre losing her own seat.

== List of leaders of the New National Party ==
Leader	Took office	Left office
Herbert Blaize	August 1984	January 1989
Keith Mitchell	January 1989	December 2024
Emmalin Pierre	December 2024	Incumbent

== Election results ==
=== House of Representatives elections ===
Election	Party leader	Votes	%	Seats	+/–	Position	Result
1984	Herbert Blaize	24,045	58.6%	14 / 15	▲8	▲1st	Supermajority government
1990	Keith Mitchell	6,916	17.5%	2 / 15	▼12	▼3rd	Opposition
1995	Keith Mitchell	14,154	32.4%	8 / 15	▲6	▲1st	Majority government
1999	Keith Mitchell	25,896	62.5%	15 / 15	▲7	1st	Won all seats
2003	Keith Mitchell	22,556	47.8%	8 / 15	▼7	1st	Majority government
2008	Keith Mitchell	27,189	47.8%	4 / 15	▼4	▼2nd	Opposition
2013	Keith Mitchell	32,031	58.8%	15 / 15	▲11	▲1st	Won all seats
2018	Keith Mitchell	33,786	58.9%	15 / 15	Steady	1st	Won all seats
2022	Keith Mitchell	28,959	47.8%	6 / 15	▼9	▼2nd	Opposition
2026	Emmalin Pierre	22,618	36.9%	1 / 15	▼5	2nd	Opposition

== See also ==
- Brenda Hood, parliamentarian and Cabinet Minister
- Emmalin Pierre, political leader of the New National Party (Grenada)
- Keith Mitchell, former prime minister and former political leader of the New National Party (Grenada)
