= Queen's Park Bombing =

Politically motivated Bombing in Grenada (1980)

- Photo from the rally, taken some hours before the incident
- Location: Queen’s Park, north of St. George's, Grenada
- Date: 19 June 1980; 3:05pm (15:05)
- Target: Maurice Bishop and the PRG
- Attack type: Bombing
- Deaths: 3
- Injuries: Between 20–100+
- Victims: Laurice Humprey (13); Bernadette Bailey (15); Laureen Charles (23)
- Perpetrators: Unknown, thought to be members of American Intelligence or traitors within the PRG
- Accused: Strachan Phillip

The Queen's Park Bombing was a bombing in Grenada on the 19 June 1980 at a New Jewel Movement rally. The blast which was near to Prime Minister Maurice Bishop killed three young women in total and injured eighty-nine others, many consider it to have been an assassination attempt on Bishop.

== Background ==
The 19 June had been declared as “Butler-Strachan day” by the NJM, it was to be a half-day holiday, dedicated to the heroes of the Grenadian revolution; Tubal Uriah ‘Buzz’ Butler and Alister Strachan. Tubal Butler was a Grenadian-born Trinidadian leader of labour movements and Alister Strachan was a member of the NJM youth activities who was murdered by the Mongoose gang in 1977.

== Rally and incident ==
On the 19 June 1980, thousands attended the rally that took place just north of the capital St George’s. The rally started with an 11-minute speech given by McGodden Kerensky ‘Cacademo’ Grant, the chairman of the rally. The bomb exploded at 3:05pm whilst the speech was ongoing, the bomb had been placed under the grandstand on which members of the government including Maurice Bishop, Bernard Coard and Hudson Austin were seated. Two nearby schoolgirls, Bernadette Bailey (aged 15) and Laurie Humphrey (aged 13) were killed instantly in the blast and another victim called Laureen Charles (aged 23) was taken to hospital where she died soon after. Over 100 people were injured in the blast.

== Aftermath ==
Hours later the People’s Revolutionary Army spontaneously executed Strachan Phillip, an early member of the NJM and who had participated in the 1979 Revolution, however he was accused of treason and executed at his home. According to the PRA and security forces, Philip and the ‘counter-revolutionary’ Budhlall Brothers (designated as anti-communist outlaws from Tivoli) has been spotted the night prior. General Hudson Austin quickly decided to lock Philip up, and sent a PRA detachment led by Major Leon ‘Bogo’ Cornwall to his house at Mt. Airy. Philip was told prior that he was going to be arrested and so defended himself and resisted arrest, firing at the troops according to the soldiers and local residents. According to Hudson Austin, Bernard Coard used the bombing as a way to eliminate Strachan Phillip who was seen as more of a bandit than a revolutionary. It is unclear whether Phillip was ever involved in the incident.

Others, especially Revolutionaries believed that the bomb was the work of American and CIA operatives in Grenada, in an attempt to execute most of the People’s Revolutionary Government members.

In the evening of the same day, Bishop spoke to the Radio Free Grenada about the incident. He gave a speech known as the ‘New Martyrs, New Heroes, New Patriots’ speech.
