= People's Revolutionary Militia =

Military unit in Grenada

People’s Revolutionary Militia
- Photo of the PRM in training
- Active: 1979–1983
- Country: Grenada
- Size: 2500–5000
- Engagements: US invasion of Grenada

Commanders
- Notable commanders: Hudson Austin

The People's Revolutionary Militia was the militia force created by the New Jewel Movement (NJM) after it seized power to provide local security against sabotage, involve masses in political action and provide a 2,500 to 5,000 member reserve force for the People's Revolutionary Army (PRA). Due to equipment shortages and administrative failings, many PRM members never received uniforms or weapons training. The best trained of the militia units were the Rapid Mobilisation Companies, one of which was provided for each PRA Defence Region. The my paid members of the militia were to receive uniforms (although many didn’t as stated previously), two months infantry training at army camps and two hours of political education classes every week. The author Edgar F. Raines described the militia as;

…less a military organisation than a patriotic society devoted to developing a sense of nationhood, promoting loyalty to the regime, and serving as a point of entry for a job in the public sector.

— Edgar F. Raines, The Rucksack War: U.S. Army Operational Logistics in Grenada, 1983, P. 21

Shortly after the overthrow and execution Maurice Bishop, the People's Revolutionary Militia began arming some of its members for civil war. The militia mobilised 257 troops during the US invasion of Grenada, many volunteers simply did not show up, mainly due to disliking the new regime that had killed Maurice Bishop.

== List of Commanders ==
- St George’s Battalion (incorporated into the PRA)— Lt. Col. Ewart Layne
- St David’s Battalion (incorporated into the PRA)— Lt. Col. Ewart Layne
- St Andrew’s Battalion— Lt. George
- St Patrick’s Battalion— Maj. David/Dave Bartholomew
- Carriacou Battalion— Lt. Calistus Bernard (Iman Abdullah)

== Notes ==
- Russell, Lee E. (1985), Grenada 1983, Osprey Publishing, ISBN 0-85045-583-9
