= History of Grenada =

The history of Grenada in the Caribbean, part of the Lesser Antilles group of islands, covers a period from the earliest human settlements to the establishment of the contemporary nationstate of Grenada. First settled by indigenous peoples, Grenada by the time of European contact was inhabited by the Caribs. French colonists killed most of the Caribs on the island and established plantations on the island, eventually importing African slaves to work on the sugar plantations.

Control of the island was disputed by Great Britain and France in the 18th century, with the British ultimately prevailing. In 1795, Fédon's Rebellion, inspired by the Haitian Revolution, very nearly succeeded, taking significant military intervention to quell. Slavery was abolished in 1833, and in 1885, the island's capital, St. George's, became the capital of the British Windward Islands.

Grenada achieved independence from Britain in 1974. Following a coup by the Marxist New Jewel Movement in 1979, the island was invaded by United States troops and the government overthrown. The island's major crop, nutmeg, was significantly damaged by Hurricane Ivan in 2004.

== Early history ==
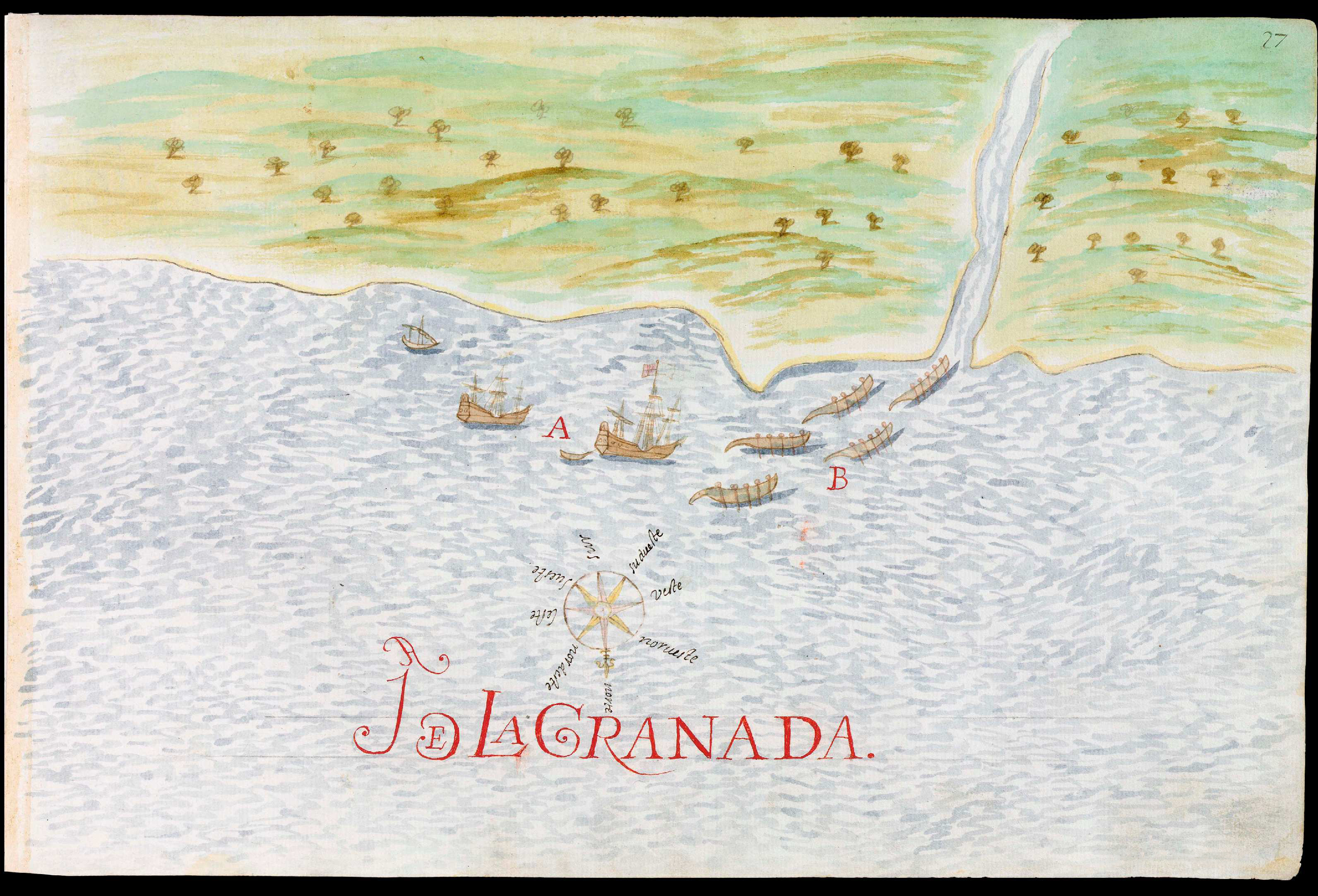
Spanish ships and Carib boats in Granada, in a report by Nicolás de Cardona, 1632.

Grenada's geological foundation began forming approximately 40-50 million years ago through volcanic activity, with most of the island's current surface geology dating from the Pliocene and Pleistocene epochs (<5 mya). During periods of lower sea levels, particularly the Last Glacial Maximum (21-26 kya) when sea levels were 120 meters below present, the entire Grenada Bank formed a much larger landmass that supported diverse megafauna including extinct giant sloths (Megalonychidae), capybaras (Hydrochoerus gaylordi), and the endemic giant rice rat (Megalomys camerhogne). Most of these terrestrial mammals arrived via over-water dispersal from South America but subsequently went extinct as rising sea levels reduced the available land area and flooded viable habitats following the end of the last ice age.

The earliest potential evidence for human presence on Grenada comes from the increase of charcoal particulates and the decline of arboreal pollen from the original climax forests, around 3760–3525 BC, during the Archaic Age. This evidence remains controversial, as it could be natural (for example, lightning fires, volcanic eruptions, etc.). Several shell fragments from archaeological sites have been dated 1700–1380 BC, but are from mixed, insecure contexts. More secure are the shell middens at Point Salines, dated between 765 and 535 BC. None of these dates are associated with definitively human artifacts, however. The earliest human-made artifacts that have been scientifically dated are from Early Ceramic Age settlements at Beausejour (260–410 AD), Pearls (370–645 AD), and the early occupation of Sauteurs Bay (355–425 AD).

Beginning around AD 750, the Amerindian population began to rise, probably as a result of continued migration from the South American mainland. Most of the 87 pre-Columbian sites identified in Grenada have a component during this period (AD 750–1200), marking the height of Grenada's indigenous population. This period also represents major cultural and environmental changes throughout the Caribbean. Several waves of groups arrived in prehistory, often associated with Arawakan or Cariban languages, but linguistic reconstruction has shown the Cariban dialect to be fragmentary (as a trade language), the primary language family being Arawakan.

Christopher Columbus reportedly sighted the island on his third voyage in 1498, but he did not land and the name he gave ("La Concepcion") never was used. By the 1520s, the island was known as "La Granada", after the recently conquered city in Granada (and thus the Grenadines were "Los Granadillos"—or "little Granadas"). By the beginning of the 18th century, the name "la Grenade" in French was in common use, eventually Anglicized to "Grenada".

Partly because of indigenous resistance, Grenada (and much of the Windwards) remained uncolonized for nearly 150 years after Columbus passed by. When the French finally settled Grenada in 1649 (see below), there were at least two, separate indigenous groups: "Caraibe" (Caribs) in the north and "Galibis" in the south-east. Evidence suggests the "Galibis" were more recent arrivals from the mainland (arriving around AD 1250), whereas the group the French called "Caraibe" were living in villages that had been (in some cases) continuously occupied for over millennium, per archaeological evidence. That is, the indigenous names were somewhat reversed in Grenada: the people the French called "Caribs" were likely descendants of the earliest peoples on Grenada, whereas the Galibis appear to have been more recent arrivals from the mainland (and thus, closer to the Carib stereotype).

== 17th century ==
=== English attempted settlement ===
In April 1609 three English ships with 208 colonists landed in what was possibly the harbor of Saint Georges or somewhere nearby. After some months the three ships left to engage in illicit trade in Trinidad. On hearing that the colony was in distress they returned to Grenada in September. The survivors were taken on board and reached England in December. The original sources are poor and we don't know what caused the colony to fail or how many settlers died. Suggestions are tropical diseases, native hostility, poor planning, inexperienced colonists, spoiled food and lack of time to harvest a food crop. This was two years after the settlement of Jamestown and the backers of both colonies seem to have been in contact.

=== French settlement and conquest ===
On 17 March 1649, a French expedition of 203 men from Martinique, led by Jacques Dyel du Parquet who had been the Governor of Martinique on behalf of the Compagnie des Îles de l'Amérique since 1637, landed at St. Georges Harbour and constructed a fortified settlement, which they named Fort Annunciation. A treaty was swiftly agreed between du Parquet and the indigenous Chief Kairouane to peacefully partition the island between the two communities. Du Parquet returned to Martinique leaving his cousin Jean Le Comte as Governor of Grenada. Conflict broke out between the French and the indigenous islanders in November 1649 and fighting lasted for five years until 1654, when the last opposition to the French on Grenada was crushed.

The first major defeat of Grenada's Amerindians occurred in 1650, at a location known as Le Morne des Sauteurs (Leapers' Hill), which overlooks Sauteurs Bay in the north of the island. A surprise attack by the French led a group of men to jump off the cliff rather than die by their enemy's sword. Archaeological excavations at the Sauteurs Bay site, west of the cliff have revealed a sizeable Amerindian settlement that was occupied continuously from AD 300 until the French conquest. The site includes a large burial ground (dated AD 900–1200) and a settlement area containing European trade goods and charcoal dated to the Protohistoric period (AD 1500–1650), corroborating historical accounts of the village attacked by the French. Since 2017, significant portions of this site, including human burials, have been destroyed by severe coastal erosion exacerbated by the construction of a breakwater.

The island continued for some time after to suffer raids by war canoe parties from St. Vincent, whose inhabitants had aided the local Grenadian islanders in their struggle and continued to oppose the French.

=== French administration ===
On 27 September 1650, du Parquet bought Grenada, Martinique, and St. Lucia from the Compagnie des Iles de l'Amerique, which was dissolved, for the equivalent of £1160. In 1657, du Parquet sold Grenada to Jean de Faudoas, Comte de Sérillac for the equivalent of £1890. In 1664, King Louis XIV bought out the independent island owners and established the French West India Company. In 1674 the French West India Company was dissolved. Proprietary rule ended in Grenada, which became a French colony as a dependency of Martinique. In 1675, Dutch privateers captured Grenada, but a French man-of-war arrived unexpectedly and recaptured the island.

== 18th century ==
=== French colony ===
In 1700, Grenada had a population of 257 whites, 53 coloureds, and 525 slaves. There were three sugar estates, 52 indigo plantations, 64 horses, and 569 head of cattle. Between 1705 and 1710 the French built Fort Royal at St. George's which is now known as Fort George. The collapse of the sugar estates and the introduction of cocoa and coffee in 1714 encouraged the development of smaller land holdings, and the island developed a land-owning yeoman farmer class. In 1738, the first hospital was constructed.

=== British colony ===
Grenada was captured by the British during the Seven Years' War on 4 March 1762 by Commodore Swanton without a shot being fired. Grenada was formally ceded to Britain by the Treaty of Paris on 10 February 1763. In 1766, the island was rocked by a severe earthquake. In 1767, a slave uprising was put down. In 1771 and again in 1775, the town of St. George, which was constructed solely of wood, was burnt to the ground – after which it was sensibly rebuilt using stone and brick. Under British administration many French properties were bought out by Britons and restrictions were placed on the Catholic church. This caused trouble since most people continued to speak French.

France recaptured Grenada between 2–4 July 1779 during the American War of Independence, after Comte d'Estaing stormed Hospital Hill. A British relief force was defeated in the naval Battle of Grenada on 6 July 1779. However, the island was restored to Britain with the Treaty of Versailles four years later on 3 September 1783. In 1784, the first newspaper, the Grenada Chronicle, began publication.

=== Fédon's Rebellion ===
Julien Fédon, a mixed-race owner of the Belvedere estate in the St. John Parish, launched a rebellion against British rule on the night of 2 March 1795, with coordinated attacks on the towns of La Baye and Gouyave. Fédon was clearly influenced by the ideas emerging from the French Revolution and was initially supported by French Revolutionary advisors. Between March 1795 and June 1796, Fédon and his troops controlled all of Grenada except the parish of St George, the seat of government. During those insurgent months, thousands of enslaved joined the revolutionary forces, with some 8,000 perishing in the final assault against the mountain stronghold in June 1796, today known as Fedon's Camp. In the aftermath, hundreds of "brigands" were later pursued and executed publicly, but Fédon himself was never caught and his fate remains unknown.

== 19th century ==
=== Early 19th century ===
In 1833, Grenada became part of the British Windward Islands Administration and remained so until 1958. British operated slavery was abolished in 1834, but the last enslaved African descendants were eventually freed in 1838. Nutmeg was introduced in 1843, when a merchant ship called in on its way to England from the East Indies.

=== Late 19th century ===
In 1857, the first East Indian immigrants arrived. In 1871, Grenada was connected to the telegraph. In 1872, the first secondary school was built. On 3 December 1877, the pure Crown colony model replaced Grenada's old representative system of government. On 3 December 1882, the largest wooden jetty ever built in Grenada was opened in Gouyave. In 1885, after Barbados left the British Windward Islands, the capital of the colonial confederation was moved from Bridgetown to St. George on Grenada. From 1889 to 1894, the 340 foot Sendall Tunnel was built for horse carriages.

== Last colonial years: 1900–1974 ==
=== Early 20th century ===
The 1901 census showed that the population of the colony was 63,438. In 1917, T.A. Marryshow founded the Representative Government Association (RGA) to agitate for a new and participative constitutional dispensation for the Grenadian people. Partly as a result of Marryshow's lobbying the Wood Commission of 1921–1922 concluded that Grenada was ready for constitutional reform in the form of a "modified" Crown Colony government. This modification granted Grenadians from 1925 the right to elect 5 of the 15 members of the Legislative Council, on a restricted property franchise enabling the wealthiest 4 percent of Grenadian adults to vote. In 1928, electricity was installed in St. George's. In 1943, Pearls Airport was opened. On 5 August 1944, the Island Queen schooner disappeared with the loss of all 56 passengers and 11 crew.

=== Towards independence: 1950–1974 ===
In 1950, Grenada had its constitution amended to increase the number of elected seats on the Legislative Council from 5 to 8, to be elected by full adult franchise at the 1951 election. In 1950 Eric Gairy founded the Grenada United Labour Party, initially as a trade union, which led the 1951 general strike for better working conditions. This sparked great unrest – so many buildings were set ablaze that the disturbances became known as the "red sky" days – and the British authorities had to call in military reinforcements to help regain control of the situation. On 10 October 1951, Grenada held its first general elections on the basis of universal adult suffrage. United Labour won six of the eight elected seats on the Legislative Council in both the 1951 and 1954 elections. However, the Legislative Council had few powers at this time, with government remaining fully in the hands of the colonial authorities.

On 22 September 1955, Hurricane Janet hit Grenada, killing 500 people and destroying 75 per cent of the nutmeg trees. A new political party, the Grenada National Party led by Herbert Blaize, contested the 1957 general election and with the cooperation of elected independent members took control of the Legislative Council from the Grenada United Labour Party. In 1958, the Windward Islands Administration was dissolved, and Grenada joined the Federation of the West Indies.

In 1960, another constitutional evolution established the post of Chief Minister, making the leader of the majority party in the Legislative Council, which at that time was Herbert Blaize, effective head of government. In March 1961, the Grenada United Labour Party won the general election and George E. D. Clyne became chief minister until Eric Gairy was elected in a by-election and took the role in August 1961. Also in 1961 the cruise ship the Bianca C caught fire in the St Georges harbour. All on board were rescued except for the engineer who was fatally burnt. In April 1962 Grenada's Administrator, the Queen's representative on the island, James Lloyd, suspended the constitution, dissolved the Legislative Council, and removed Gairy as Chief Minister, following allegations concerning the Gairy's financial impropriety. At the 1962 general election, the Grenada National Party won a majority and Herbert Blaize became Chief Minister for the second time.

After the Federation of the West Indies collapsed in 1962, the British government tried to form a small federation out of its remaining dependencies in the Eastern Caribbean. Following the failure of this second effort, the British and the islanders developed the concept of "associated statehood". Under the West Indies Act on 3 March 1967 (also known as the Associated Statehood Act) Grenada was granted full autonomy over its internal affairs. Herbert Blaize was the first Premier of the Associated State of Grenada from March to August 1967. Eric Gairy served as premier from August 1967 until February 1974, as the Grenada United Labour Party won majorities in both the 1967 and 1972 general elections.

== Independence, revolution and US invasion: 1974–1983 ==
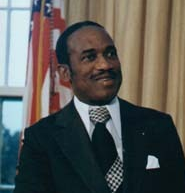
Prime Minister, Eric Gairy

=== Independence ===
On 7 February 1974, Grenada became a fully independent state. Grenada continued to practise a modified Westminster parliamentary system based on the British model with a governor-general appointed by and representing the British monarch (head of state) and a prime minister who are both leader of the majority party and the head of government. Eric Gairy was independent Grenada's first prime minister serving from 1974 until his overthrow in 1979. Gairy won re-election in Grenada's first general election as an independent state in 1976; however, the opposition New Jewel Movement refused to recognize the result, claiming the poll was fraudulent, and so began working towards the overthrow of the Gairy regime by revolutionary means. In 1976, St. George's University was established.

=== The 1979 coup and revolutionary government ===
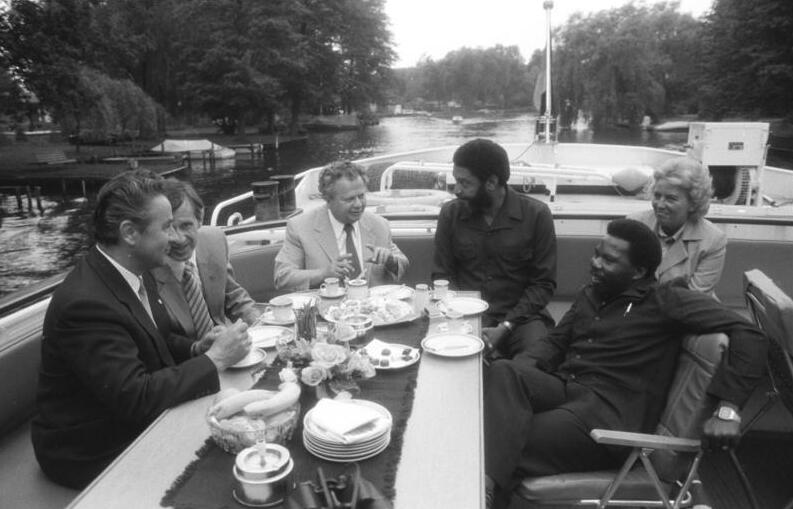
Maurice Bishop visiting East Berlin, East Germany, 1982.

On March 13, 1979, the New Jewel Movement launched an armed revolution that removed Gairy, suspended the constitution, and established a People's Revolutionary Government (PRG), headed by Maurice Bishop who declared himself prime minister. His Marxist-Leninist government established close ties with Cuba, Nicaragua, and other communist bloc countries. All political parties except for the New Jewel Movement were banned and no elections were held during the four years of PRG rule.

=== The 1983 coups ===
On 14 October 1983, a power struggle within Bishop's ruling party ended with his house arrest. His erstwhile friend and rival, Deputy Prime Minister, Bernard Coard, briefly became Head of Government. This coup precipitated demonstrations in various parts of the island which eventually led to Bishop being freed from arrest by an impassioned crowd of his loyal supporters on 19 October 1983. Bishop was soon recaptured by Grenadian soldiers loyal to the Coard faction and executed along with seven others, including three members of the cabinet.

That same day the Grenadian military under Gen. Hudson Austin took power in a second coup and formed a military government to run the country. A four-day total curfew was declared under which any civilian outside their home was subject to summary execution.

=== Invasion ===
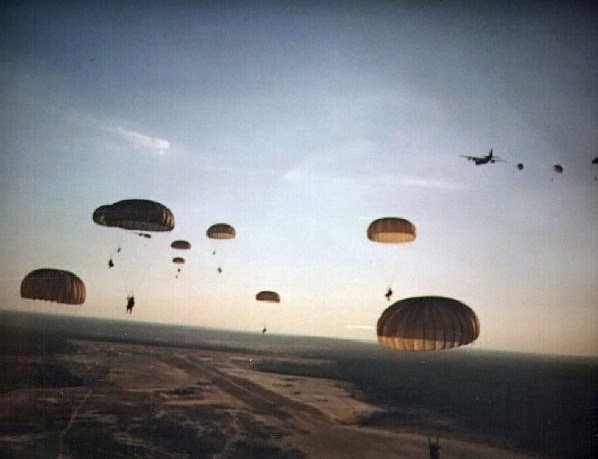
US Army Rangers parachute into Grenada during Operation Urgent Fury

A U.S.–Caribbean led force invaded Grenada on 25 October 1983, in an action called Operation Urgent Fury, and swiftly defeated the Grenadian forces and their Cuban allies. During the fighting 45 Grenadians, 25 Cubans, and 19 Americans were killed. This action was taken in response to an appeal obtained from the governor general and to a request for assistance from the Organization of Eastern Caribbean States, without consulting the island's head of state, Queen Elizabeth II, Commonwealth institutions or other usual diplomatic channels (as had been done in Anguilla). Furthermore, United States government military strategists feared that Soviet use of the island would enable the Soviet Union to project tactical power over the entire Caribbean region. U.S. citizens were evacuated, and constitutional government was resumed. The United States gave $48.4 million in economic assistance to Grenada in 1984.

In 1986, members of the PRG and the PRA were criminally tried for civilian killings associated with the October 19 coup. Fourteen, including Coard and his wife, Phyllis Coard, were sentenced to death for actions related to the murder of 11 people, including Maurice Bishop. Three other defendants, all PRA soldiers, were convicted of the lesser charge of manslaughter and sentenced to 30 or more years. The convicted prisoners came to be known as the Grenada 17, and the subject of an ongoing international campaign for their release. In 1991, all the murder sentences were commuted to life imprisonment. In October 2003 Amnesty International issued a report which stated that their trial had been "gross violation of international standards governing the fairness of trials." In 2009, the last seven prisoners were released after serving 26 years.

== 1983 to present day ==
=== Post invasion politics ===
When US troops withdrew from Grenada in December 1983, Nicholas Braithwaite was appointed Prime Minister of an interim administration by the Governor General Sir Paul Scoon until elections could be organized.

On 28 October 1984, the new Point Salines International Airport was opened, which enabled Grenada to receive large commercial jets for the first time.

The first democratic elections since 1976 were held in December 1984 and were won by the Grenada National Party under Herbert Blaize who won 14 out of 15 seats in elections and served as prime minister until his death in December 1989. The NNP continued in power until 1989 but with a reduced majority. Five NNP parliamentary members, including two cabinet ministers, left the party in 1986–87 and formed the National Democratic Congress (NDC) which became the official opposition. In August 1989, Prime Minister Blaize broke with the GNP to form another new party, The National Party (TNP), from the ranks of the NNP. This split in the NNP resulted in the formation of a minority government until constitutionally scheduled elections in March 1990. Prime Minister Blaize died in December 1989 and was succeeded as prime minister by Ben Jones until after the 1990 elections.

The National Democratic Congress emerged from the 1990 elections as the strongest party, winning 7 of the fifteen available seats. Nicholas Brathwaite added 2 TNP members and 1 member of the Grenada United Labor Party (GULP) to create a 10-seat majority coalition. The governor general appointed him to be prime minister for a second time. Braithwaite resigned in Feb 1995 and was succeeded as prime minister by George Brizan who served until the Jun 1995 election.

In parliamentary elections on 20 June 1995, the NNP won 8 of the 15 seats and formed a government headed by Keith Mitchell. The NNP maintained and affirmed its hold on power when it took all 15 parliamentary seats in the January 1999 elections. Mitchell went on to win the 2003 elections with a reduced majority of eight of the 15 seats, and served as prime minister for a record 13 years until his defeat in 2008.

The 2001 census showed that the population of Grenada was 100,895.

The 2008 election was won by the National Democratic Congress under Tillman Thomas with 11 of the 15 seats.

In 2009, Point Salines International Airport was renamed Maurice Bishop International Airport in tribute to the former prime minister.

==== Since 2013 ====
In February 2013, the governing National Democratic Congress (NDC) lost the election. The opposition New National Party (NNP) won all 15 seats in the general election. Keith Mitchell, leader of NNP, who had served three terms as prime minister between 1995 and 2008, returned to power.

In December 2014, Grenada joined Bolivarian Alliance for the Peoples of Our America (ALBA) as a full member. Prime minister Mitchell said that the membership was a natural extension of the co-operation Grenada have had over the years with both Cuba and Venezuela.

Mitchell has led NNP to win all 15 seats in the House of Representatives on 3 occasions. In November 2021, Prime Minister Keith Mitchell said that the upcoming general elections which are constitutionally due no later than June 2023, will be the last one for him.

In June 2022, the opposition National Democratic Congress (NDC) won the snap election. The NDC won nine of the 15 parliamentary seats.The leader of NDC, Dickon Mitchell, became the new prime minister, meaning Keith Mitchell, Grenada's longest-serving prime minister, lost his post.

=== Truth and reconciliation commission ===
In 2001, much of the controversy of the late 1970s and early 1980s was once again brought into the public consciousness with the opening of the truth and reconciliation commission. The commission was chaired by a Catholic priest, Father Mark Haynes, and was tasked with uncovering injustices arising from the PRA, Bishop's regime, and before. It held a number of hearings around the country. The commission was formed because of a school project. Brother Robert Fanovich, head of Presentation Brothers' College (PBC) in St. George's tasked some of his senior students with conducting a research project into the era and specifically into the fact that Maurice Bishop's body was never discovered. Their project attracted a great deal of attention, including from the Miami Herald and the final report was published in a book written by the boys called Big Sky, Little Bullet. It also uncovered that there was still a lot of resentment in Grenadian society resulting from the era, and a feeling that there were many injustices still unaddressed. The commission began shortly after the boys concluded their project.

=== Hurricane Ivan ===
On 7 September 2004, Grenada was hit directly by category four Hurricane Ivan. The hurricane destroyed about 80 percent of the structures on the island, including the prison and the prime minister's residence, killed thirty-nine people, and destroyed most of the nutmeg crop, Grenada's economic mainstay. Grenada's economy was set back several years by Hurricane Ivan's impact. Hurricane Emily ravaged the island's north end in July 2005.

== See also ==
- British colonization of the Americas
- French colonization of the Americas
- History of North America
- History of the Americas
- History of the British West Indies
- History of the Caribbean
- List of governors of the Windward Islands
- List of heads of government of Grenada
- Politics of Grenada
- Spanish colonization of the Americas
- West Indies Federation
