= Alimenta Bishop =

Grenadian activist (1914–2013)

- Born: Alimenta Lagrenade; 1914; Grenada
- Died: 24 August 2013 (aged 98–99)
- Spouse: Rupert Bishop
- Children: 3 (including Maurice Bishop)
- Relatives: Cécile La Grenade (niece)

Alimenta Bishop (née Lagrenade; 1914 – 24 August 2013) was a Grenadian activist and stateswoman, known for being the mother of Prime Minister of Grenada Maurice Bishop, who was leader of the New Jewel Movement (NJM). Following her sons execution, she campaigned for many years for the recovery of his remains.

== Biography ==
Alimenta Bishop and her husband Rupert hailed from the northeast of the island of Grenada. At the end of 1930, to improve his financial position, they moved to Aruba so that he could work in the oil refinery. She had one son, and two daughters Ann and Maureen. Her husband was killed by the Mongoose Gang during an independence protest against the government of Prime Minister Eric Gairy in 1974. Bishop came to public life when her son took power in the Grenadian Revolution. She was present when he was overthrown was deposed by Deputy Prime Minister Bernard Coard and executed.

In 1998, she was visited at her home by Fidel Castro. In 2005, she asked the authorities to release the body of her son to her care. In 2009, she was among dignitaries present when the National Democratic Congress (NDC) government renamed the Point Saline International Airport to the Maurice Bishop International Airport.

Bishop wished to find her son's burial place in the years following his death. She stated that the only thing she wanted to know before her death was to know where her son’s body had been buried. She died in August 2013.
