= Liam James (politician) =

Deputy Prime Minister of Grenada
- In office October 1983 – October 1983
- Prime Minister: Bernard Coard
- Preceded by: Bernard Coard

Personal details
- Born: 1955 (age 70–71) Birchgrove, Grenada
- Party: New Jewel Movement

Lieutenant-Colonel Liam James 'Owusu' is Grenadian politician from New Jewel Movement. He was once considered third most powerful figure in the Grenada Revolution after Maurice Bishop and Bernard Coard.

He was born 1955 in Birchgrove, Saint Andrew parish. He was born into a farming family in Grenada. He studied in a Catholic college. In 1971 he founded student organization (Joint Organization of Youth) with Basil Gahagan. He was an early member in the New Jewel Movement (NJM). He worked as a trade unionist between 1974 and 1979.

== In the Revolutionary Government ==
James was army officer in the People’s Revolutionary Army. He was considered third most powerful figure in the Grenada Revolution after Maurice Bishop and Bernard Coard. He served as the chief of national security and deputy minister of interior. In 1980 he was a member of NJM central committee, and deputy minister of defense. In September 1983, he was in the anti-Bishop coalition. He was appointed as the Deputy Prime Minister by Bernard Coard when Maurice Bishop was toppled in October 1983.

At the formation of Hudson Austin's Revolutionary Military Council (RMC), James was effectively in control of the army with Ewart Layne. Austin's vice-chairmen on the RMC were Liam James and Ewart Layne. The RMC was toppled six days later by the United States invasion of Grenada on 25 October 1983.

== After the Invasion ==
James was one of the Grenada 17. He was arrested, tried and convicted of murder in 1986 for his role in the murder of Maurice Bishop on 19 October 1983 at Fort George. He was sentenced to hang, but the sentence was later commuted. James was released from prison in September 2009.
