= Phyllis Coard =

Jamaican-Grenadian revolutionary and politician (1943–2020)

Deputy Minister of Women’s Affairs in the People's Revolutionary Government (PRG) of Grenada
- In office Position established – 19 October 1983
- Prime Minister: Maurice Bishop; Bernard Coard
- Preceded by: Position established

President of the National Women’s Organisation (NWO) of the New Jewel Movement (NJM)
- In office 6 December 1982 – 19 October 1983
- Prime Minister: Maurice Bishop; Bernard Coard

Personal details
- Born: Phyllis Evans; 2 November 1943 Jamaica
- Died: 6 September 2020 (aged 76) Kingston, Jamaica
- Citizenship: Grenada
- Party: New JEWEL Movement (NJM); Communist Party of Great Britain (CPGB)
- Other political affiliations: National Women’s Organisation (NWO)
- Spouse: Bernard Coard (m. 1967)
- Children: 3
- Education: University of Reading; London School of Economics
- Profession: Social worker, omen’s rights activist, communist, revolutionary, educator, writer and politician

Phyllis Coard (née Evans, 2 November 1943 – 6 September 2020) was a Jamaican-born Grenadian social worker, women's rights activist, communist, revolutionary, educator, writer and politician. She was founder member and president of the National Women's Organisation (NWO), was a minister in the People's Revolutionary Government (PRG), was a central committee member of Grenada's New JEWEL Movement (NJM) party, and was the only woman member of the "Grenada 17" group who were controversially convicted for ordering the murder of Prime Minister Maurice Bishop in 1983.

== Early life and education ==
Coard was born on 2 November 1943 in Jamaica. Her father Frederick Evans was an accountant, her mother Sybil Wilson Evans was a bookkeeper, and her uncle Ken Evans was a businessman who founded the Tia Maria coffee liqueur company. She had an older sister.

Coard studied undergraduate and postgraduate qualifications at the University of Reading and the London School of Economics in England. After graduating, she worked as a qualified social worker in London. In 1967, while living in England, she married Bernard Coard and they had three children together. They both became members of the Communist Party of Great Britain (CPGB) and had Marxist-Leninist ideologies.

After returning to the Caribbean, Coard taught sociology at the University of the West Indies (UWI) in Trinidad and Tobago. The Coards moved to Grenada in 1974.

== Political career ==
Coard and her husband joined the New Jewel Movement NJM in 1976. In December 1977, Coard was one of the founder members of the National Women's Committee (NWO) of the NJM. Coard was elected as president of the NWO at its inaugural congress held on the 6 December 1982, with Rita Joseph as her vice-president.

Following the revolutionary coup against Eric Gairy’s rule by the NJM, known as the Revolution of 1979, the socialist People’s Revolutionary Government (PRG) was installed. Coard was a central committee member of the NJM and was appointed as the country’s first deputy minister of women’s affairs in the Ministry of Education and Social Affairs. Her husband was deputy prime minister.

While in government, Coard pushed women's and children's issues to the front of the political agenda. She secured equal pay legislation for women, codified maternity leave in law, mobilised women’s involvement in non-traditional occupations and established the River Road Day Care nursery under the NJM’s "Economic Enterprises of the People" programme. She also helped to revive and develop the Free West Indian newspaper and led Radio Free Grenada’s development.

The PRG was led by Prime Minister Maurice Bishop. In September 1983, a radical faction in the NJM led by Coard and her husband tried to requested that the more moderate Bishop to either step down or agree to a power-sharing arrangement after political disagreements. After rejecting the proposal as he felt that joint leadership was untenable, Bishop was placed under house arrest on 13 October 1983 by the Grenadian Army. Bishop allegedly confided to a journalist: "I am a dead man." Bishop was released from his house arrest by a crowd on 19 October 1983. After walking to Fort Rupert (now Fort George), a four-man firing squad executed Bishop, along with cabinet members and aides, including Unison Whiteman, Norris Bain and Jacqueline Creft. The remains of Bishop and those who died with him have never been found.

After the death of Bishop, Coard's husband named himself prime minister. Partly as a result of Bishop's murder, the Organization of Eastern Caribbean States (OECS) and the nations of Barbados and Jamaica appealed to the United States for assistance, as did Sir Paul Scoon, Governor-General of Grenada. Within days, President Ronald Reagan launched a US-led invasion to overthrow the PRG, with additional troops and police from Jamaica, Dominica, St. Lucia, Antigua, St. Vincent and Barbados. The operation was carried out without the approval of the United Nations Security Council. Coard's faction was ousted and Grenada was administered by the occupying forces until 31 October 1983.

== Incarceration ==
On 29 October 1983, Coard and her husband were arrested by the occupying forces. Coard was initially held as a "prisoner of war" on a United States warship, before being transferred to prison to await trial. The Coards were both members of the "Grenada 17" who were tried and convicted for ordering the assassination of Bishop in a seven-month trial. Coard was the only woman among the 17. During the trial she shouted at presiding judge Sir Dennis Byron: "the world will condemn you!" Coard was sentenced to death by hanging, but her sentence was commuted to life imprisonment in 1991. During the trial Coard was injured due to an attack on her bus. She was lifted into the courtroom on a stretcher.

Coard was imprisoned in Richmond Hill Prison in Saint George's, Grenada, where she was the only female prisoner in Grenada during some of the years of her incarceration. She went on hunger strike to protest against the conditions in prison. Later in her imprisonment, she taught literacy to other inmates. Coard's husband was also convicted and imprisoned, and their three children were repatriated to Jamaica to be raised by family friends during their parents incarceration.

Coard was released from prison in 2000 on compassionate grounds by the New National Party (NNP) government of Prime Minister Keith Mitchell to allow her to receive medical treatment for colon cancer in Jamaica. Coard published the books US War on One Woman: My Conditions of imprisonment in Grenada (1988) and Unchained – A Caribbean Woman’s Journey Through Invasion, Incarceration and Liberation (2019) about her experiences in prison.

The controversial trial of the Grenada 17 has been criticised by Amnesty International in an October 2003 report, by the United Kingdom's High Court of Justice in 2014, and by former United States Attorney General Ramsey Clark in 1997. Clark stated that: "from my review of the record, there was no credible evidence that the members of the Central Committee of the New Jewel Movement ever ordered or even had the opportunity to order the murders of which they were found guilty." The Jamaican politician, historian and lawyer Richard Hart outlined in his book The Grenada Trial a Travesty of Justice (1993) that one witness pointed to a white journalist in the courtroom when asked to identify Phylis Coard, despite Coard being a black woman.

On 7 February 2007, the London-based Judicial Committee of the Privy Council ordered a re-sentencing of Coard's husband and others convicted for the 1983 killing of Bishop. Her husband was freed from prison in September 2009 and he joined her in Jamaica where she remained for medical treatment.

== Death ==
Coard died on 6 September 2020 while in hospital in Kingston, Jamaica, aged 76.
