= People's Revolutionary Army (Grenada) =

Military loyal to the People's Revolutionary Government in Grenada

- Active: 1979–1983
- Country: Grenada
- Allegiance: People's Revolutionary Government; Cuba; Soviet Union
- Branch: People's Revolutionary Armed Forces
- Type: National security
- Size: 1,200 soldiers
- Garrison/HQ: St. George's
- Nickname: PRA
- Colors: Red and white
- Engagements: 1979 Revolution, United States invasion of Grenada

Commanders
- Chairman of the Revolutionary Military Council: Hudson Austin (last)
- Vice Minister of Defense and Chief of Staff: Major Einstein Louison

Insignia
- Symbol

The People’s Revolutionary Army (PRA) was the ground-based military force of Grenada between 1979 and 1983. The People's Revolutionary Militia served as its reserve force. The two, alongside the Grenada Police and the Coast Guard, were collectively termed as the People's Revolutionary Armed Forces (PRAF) from 1981.

The PRA took over the Grenada Defence Force (GDF) after the revolution in 1979.

== History ==
=== Roots ===
The PRA traces its roots to the National Liberation Army (NLA), which was formed in 1973 as the military wing of the insurgent New JEWEL Movement (NJM) Party. In late 1977, the party dispatched 12 NLA leaders for four weeks of clandestine military training by a unit of the Guyana Defence Force. The group of 11 Grenadian men and one woman were known as "The 12 Apostles." They received intensive training in guerrilla tactics, weapons and other warfare skills in preparation for the overthrow of the government of Eric Gairy.

The near-bloodless coup occurred on the morning of March 13, 1979, on the orders of the NJM's Security and Defense Committee and under the tactical military leadership of key "Apostles". No casualties were inflicted on the police or on the GDF. The armed takeover was popularly supported and subsequently became known as the Grenada Revolution.

=== Foundation and development ===
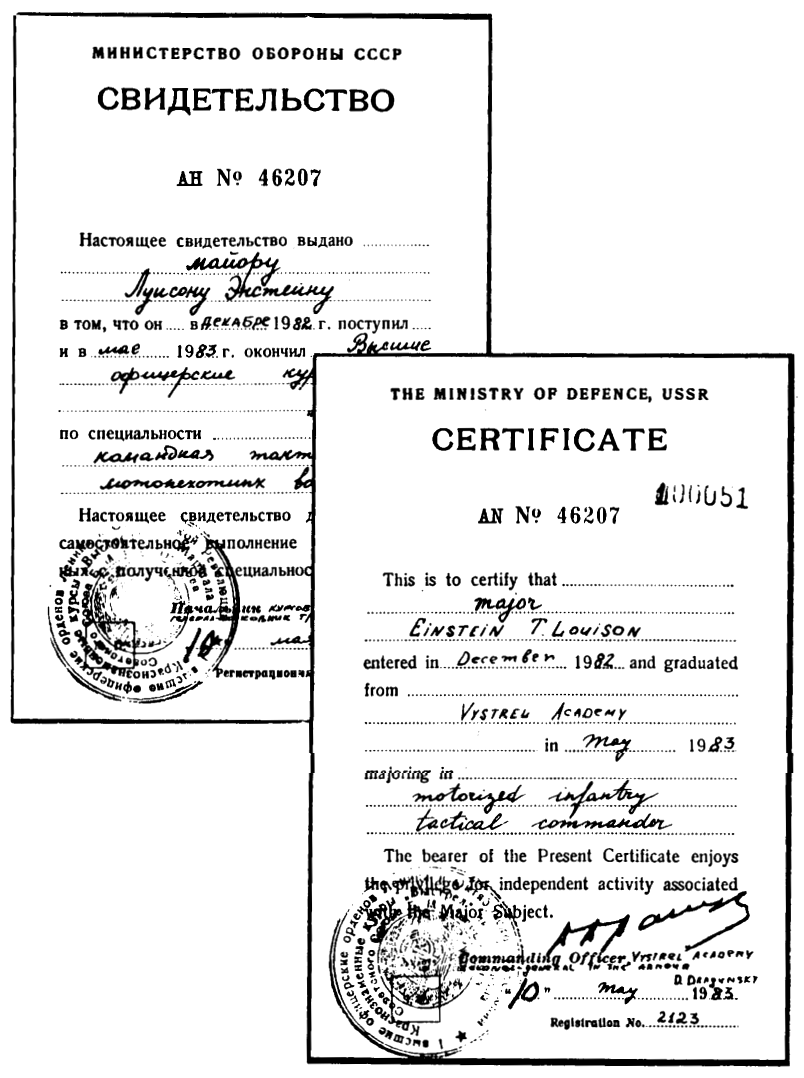
The certificate given by the Soviet defense ministry to Major Louison upon completion of the Vystrel course, signed by General David Dragunsky.

After the New JEWEL Movement party seized power, the Grenadian army was renamed the People's Revolutionary Army and expanded at a rapid pace. In January 1981, the revolutionary government formed the Revolutionary Armed Forces (PRAF), an umbrella organization that included the army, the militia, the police service, the prison service, the Coast Guard and the fire service. The Grenadian uniformed force far outnumbered the combined police and military of all their Eastern Caribbean neighbors. The Soviet Union and Cuba supplied most of the weapons. Promising soldiers and officers were trained in those countries. By 1983 the Movement was split over who should lead the party forward. Some believe the faction led by Prime Minister Maurice Bishop wanted closer ties with the West, while the faction led by Deputy Prime Minister Bernard Coard wanted to speed up the conversion to a communist state. Others contend the power struggle had more to do with leadership style and rivalry than differences in ideology between the two estranged friends.

The Chief of Staff of the PRA, Major Einstein Louison, was educated at the Vystrel course in the Soviet Union. In March 1983, he met with Soviet General Nikolai Ogarkov, who promised Louison that the Soviet Union would contribute to raising the combat readiness of the PRA.

=== American invasion ===
On 13 October, the NJM's Central Committee placed Bishop under house arrest after he balked at a power-sharing agreement. Minister of Foreign Affairs Unison Whiteman returned from New York, where he was scheduled to address the United Nations, and instead began to negotiate with Coard for Bishop's release. Over the next few days, pro-Bishop demonstrations occurred throughout the island and a general strike was called in St. George's. On 18 October, demonstrators surged through the city chanting pro-Bishop and anti-Coard slogans while police and PRA soldiers watched. The protests reached a climax on 19 October. Whiteman addressed a growing crowd in the streets of St. George's. The crowd marched to Mount Wheldale to free Bishop from his home. At first, Bishop's guards held their ground and even fired warning shots. Eventually they were overwhelmed and the demonstrators freed Bishop. Bishop, Whiteman and the demonstrators then marched downhill to Fort Rupert to take over the headquarters for the People's Revolutionary Army by sheer weight of numbers.

The PRA leadership called in reinforcements, including three BTR-60s and additional troops. Shooting broke out at the fort under disputed circumstances. Three soldiers and eight civilians were killed in the ensuing melee, and about 100 civilians wounded, a 2003 study found. The PRA quickly rearrested Bishop, Whiteman, two other government ministers, a trade union leader and three Bishop supporters. These eight prisoners were subsequently executed by a firing squad of soldiers, bringing the total killed at the fort to 19.

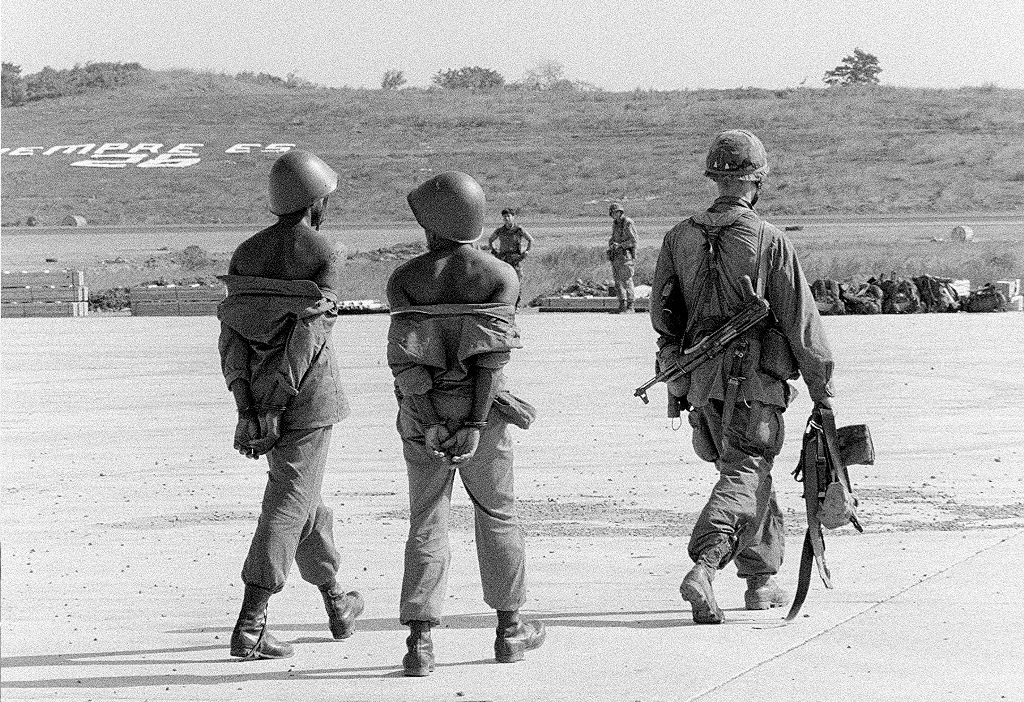
Two captured PRA soldiers being escorted by a US Ranger during Operation Urgent Fury

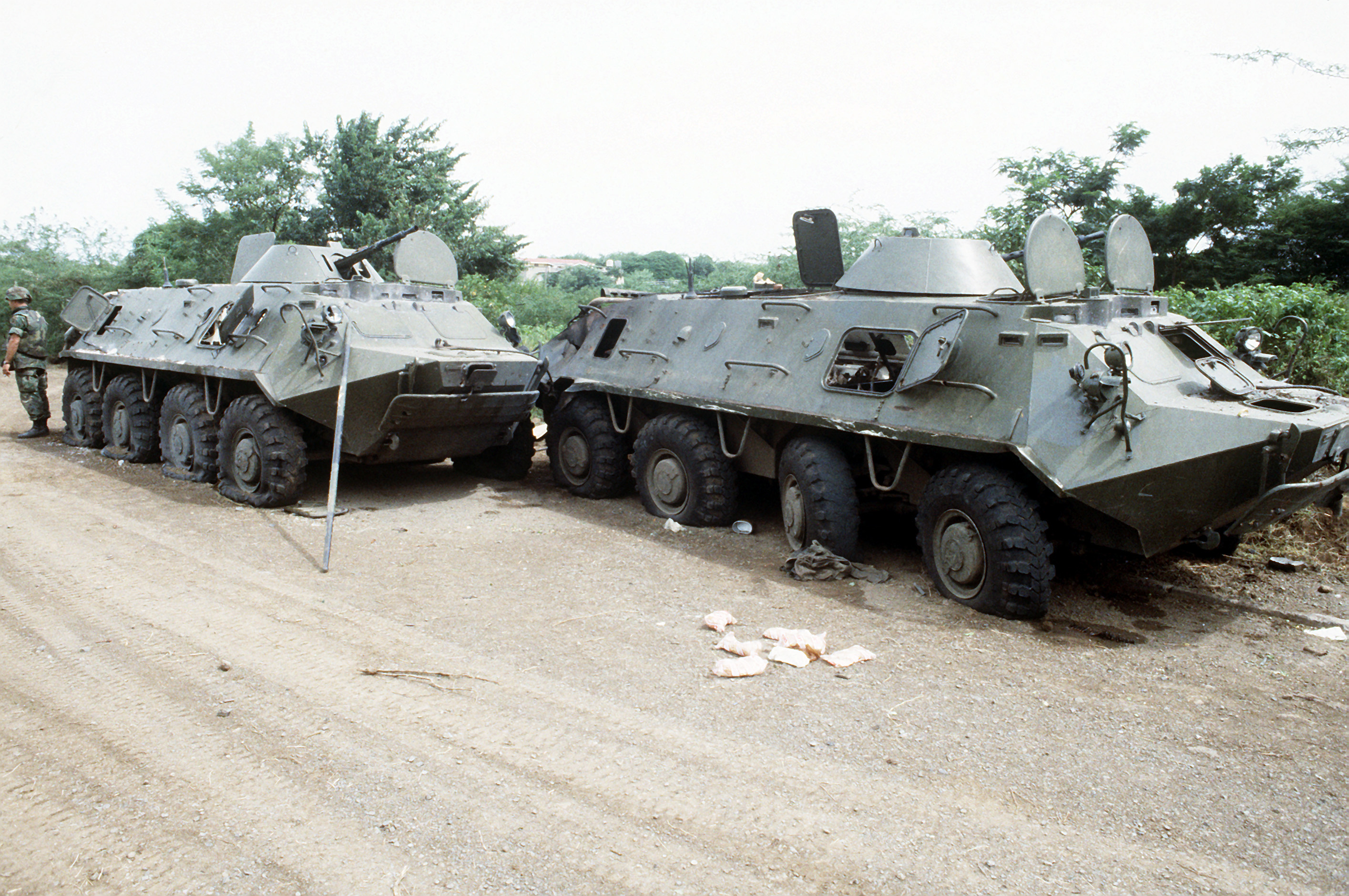
Two Grenadian BTR-60s captured during Operation Urgent Fury

After Bishop's death, Hudson Austin established a Military Revolutionary Council composed entirely of 16 Army officers. Martial law was declared and 24-hour immediate curfew imposed. Violators were to be shot on sight, but none were. The curfew lasted four days and many prominent citizens were arrested. They included former Bishop officials, PRA officers and NJM members thought to be disloyal.

On 25 October 1983, the vanguard of 7,600 troops from the United States, and 350 from the Caribbean Peace Force, invaded Grenada, encountering resistance from the People's Revolutionary Army. On the morning before the invasion, the PRAF mustered a permanent force of 463 men, supplemented by 257 militia and 58 untrained NJM party members. The multinational intervention was also opposed by 636 armed Cuban construction workers under the leadership of 43 Cuban military advisers. The combat was occasionally intense for two days, but hostilities were declared ceased by U.S. forces on Nov. 2, 1983.

A Pentagon historical study of Operation Urgent Fury later reported: "US forces lost 19 killed and 116 wounded. Cuban forces lost 25 killed, 59 wounded and 638 captured. Grenadian forces suffered 45 killed and 358 wounded; at least 24 civilians killed."

By 27 October 1983, most of the Grenadian soldiers had either fled into the forests and mountains or shed their military uniforms in an attempt to blend with the civilian population. Many of these soldiers were pointed out by Grenadian civilians to U.S. troops and arrested. The PRAF was disbanded and the island's police force was reconstituted and retrained.

=== Post-invasion ===
In 1986, 18 Grenadians were tried by a Grenadian court for the 19 deaths that occurred at Ft. Rupert on Oct. 19, 1983. Seventeen defendants were convicted by a jury of murder or manslaughter, including eight PRA officers and three soldiers. All were imprisoned on the island while supporters waged a long-running campaign to free the so-called Grenada 17. The last of the 17 were released from Richmond Hill Prison in 2009 after serving up to 26 years in prison.

Some ex-PRA soldiers were recruited to serve in the SSU due to lack of available manpower to form it.

== Equipment ==
The military was mostly equipped with a mix of Soviet, Chinese, and Czechoslovak weapons and vehicles. They also inherited some weapons from the GDF and the RGPF.

=== Infantry weapons ===
Name	Image	Origin	Type	Note
Makarov PM		Soviet Union	Semi-automatic pistol	
Tokarev TT-33		Soviet Union	Semi-automatic pistol	
CZ 52		Czechoslovakia	Semi-automatic pistol	
PPSh-41		Soviet Union	Submachine gun	
PPS		Soviet Union	Submachine gun	
Uzi		Israel	Submachine gun	
M3A1		United States	Submachine gun	
Sten Mk II		United Kingdom	Submachine gun	
Sterling		United Kingdom	Submachine gun	
Sa vz. 23		Czechoslovakia	Submachine gun	
Vz. 52		Czechoslovakia	Semi-automatic rifle	
SKS		Soviet Union	Semi-automatic rifle	
Lee-Enfield		United Kingdom	Bolt-action rifle	
Mosin–Nagant M44		Soviet Union	Bolt-action rifle	
AKM		Soviet Union	Assault rifle	
M16A1		United States	Assault rifle	
PKM		Soviet Union	Medium machine gun	
Bren		United Kingdom	Light machine gun	
Vz. 52		Czechoslovakia	Light machine gun	
DShK		Soviet Union	Heavy machine gun	
Type 56		China	Anti-tank	
RPG-7		Soviet Union	Rocket launcher	
F1		Soviet Union	Hand grenade	

=== Armoured vehicles ===
Name	Image	Origin	Type	Quantity
BTR-60		Soviet Union	Amphibious armoured personnel carrier	8
BRDM-2		Soviet Union	Amphibous armoured scout car	2
T-55		Soviet Union	Medium tank	?
T-72		Soviet Union	Main battle tank	?
PT-76		Soviet Union	Amphibious light tank	15

=== Anti-aircraft guns ===
Name	Image	Origin	Type	Quantity
ZU-23-2		Soviet Union	Anti-aircraft	12

=== Artillery ===
Name	Image	Origin	Type	Quantity
ZiS-3		Soviet Union	Field gun	4
M1937		Soviet Union	Infantry mortar	?
SPG-9		Soviet Union	Anti-tank	?
Type 56		China	Recoilless anti-tank	?
