= Grenada 17 =

Seventeen political and military figures imprisoned in Grenada

The Grenada 17 was the group name given to 17 individuals who were convicted of murder and manslaughter in the October 1983 palace coup against Prime Minister Maurice Bishop of Grenada. The group, consisting of People's Revolutionary Government (PRG) officials and military personnel, were tried in 1986. Many of them received death sentences that were later commuted to life imprisonment. All 17 were eventually released from prison by 2009.

== History ==
On 13 October 1983, PRG officials under the direction of Deputy Prime Minister Bernard Coard deposed and secretly placed under house arrest Prime Minister Maurice Bishop. Once his detention became publicly known, mass protests occurred throughout the island nation of Grenada. On 19 October, "crowds estimated at between 15,000 to 30,000 persons shut down workplaces, poured into the streets of the capital, St. George’s, and freed Bishop from house arrest."

Bishop led a large contingent to Fort Rupert, which they seized control of and occupied. Later in the day, a convoy of soldiers arrived from Fort Frederick to retake Fort Rupert. Some civilians died in the ensuing skirmish. After Bishop surrendered, he and seven cabinet members and supporters were lined up against a courtyard wall inside Fort Rupert and executed by firing squad. The eight victims were:

- Prime Minister Maurice Bishop
- Foreign Minister Unison Whiteman
- Minister of Housing Norris Bain
- President of the Agricultural and General Workers Union Fitzroy Bain
- Minister of Education Jacqueline Creft
- Keith Hayling of the Marketing & National Import Board
- Evelyn Bullen, businessman
- Cecil Evelyn Maitland, businessman

Hudson Austin quickly formed a new ruling government, the Revolutionary Military Council (RMC), with himself installed as chairman but with Bernard Coard believed to be the behind-the-scenes leader. On 25 October 1983, the United States invaded Grenada and overthrew the RMC.

Three years later, eighteen people were put on trial for their involvement in the killing of Bishop and the seven others. On 4 December 1986, the High Court of Grenada convicted the following fourteen defendants of multiple counts of murder, and sentenced them to death by hanging:

- Hudson Austin (Head of the Army)
- Bernard Coard (Deputy Prime Minister/Acting Prime Minister)
- Dave Bartholomew (Grenadian politician) (Central Committee member)
- Callistus Bernard (private in charge of the firing squad at Fort Rupert - admitted shooting Bishop)
- Phyllis Coard (Deputy Minister for Foreign Affairs)
- Leon Cornwall (Central Committee member)
- Liam James (Central Committee member)
- Ewart Layne (General - dispatched Army forces to Fort Rupert)
- Colville McBarnette (Central Committee member)
- Cecil Prime (Captain - present at Fort Rupert at the time of the executions)
- Lester Redhead (Captain - present at Fort Rupert at the time of the executions)
- Selwyn "Sello" Strachan (Central Committee member)
- Christopher Stroude (Major - present at Fort Rupert at the time of the executions)
- John Ventour (Captain)

The following two defendants were found guilty of eight counts of manslaughter and handed 45-year prison sentences:

- Raymond Vincent Joseph
- Cosmos Richardson

Andy Mitchell was also found guilty of manslaughter and sentenced to 30 years in prison. He was the last member of the Grenada 17. Raeburn Nelson was found not guilty and released.

Bernard Coard said at the time that they were convicted in a "kangaroo court and show trial". His wife Phyllis shouted at Judge Dennis Byron, "The world will condemn you!".

All fourteen death sentences were subsequently commuted to prison terms.

During the initial years of their imprisonment, the Grenada 17 alleged they were systematically abused by guards, until Prison Commissioner Winston Courtney intervened on the prisoners' behalf.

The release of the Grenada 17 began in March 2000 when Phyllis Coard was freed to undergo cancer treatment. In June 2007, Christopher Stroude, Lester Redhead and Cecil Prime were freed. Hudson Austin, Colville McBarnett and John Ventour were freed in December 2008. Then, on 4 September 2009, the final seven were released. Senator Chester Humphrey described it as a milestone in the island's efforts to heal wounds from the events of October 1983: "It's the end of one chapter, not the completion of the book, as Grenada tries to build a future by not living in the past."

== Claims of the accused ==
Most of the Grenada 17 avoided taking personal responsibility for the executions in Fort Rupert. The 17 prisoners issued a public apology in 1997, printed in the Grenadian Voice, in which they admitted to a collective responsibility for the tragedy.

Ewart Layne signed a confession at the time of Bishop's murder stating that he gave the orders which led to the executions. But he, along with nine other prisoners, later claimed they were beaten and forced to sign confessions. Colville McBarnette also said he was coerced into "confessing". He asserted that the testimony by prosecution witness, Cletus St. Paul, "about seeing me at Fort Frederick on October 1983, in a huddle prior to the departure of soldiers to Fort Rupert was false".

Callistus Bernard, the private who admitted to organizing the firing squad, said that during the skirmish to retake Fort Rupert, he "lost it" and was not in control of his mental state. Hudson Austin never attempted to explain or defend his actions. In a mitigation plea before the regional Supreme Court in 2007, his attorney simply said that Austin and his fellow prisoners "have experienced emotional, spiritual, and academic growth and understand the need to satisfy action for loss and suffering and the trauma of the Grenadian people."

In interviews conducted years after the tragedy, Bernard Coard attributed the Fort Rupert executions to vengeance by relatively untrained Grenadian soldiers, but added that he and others in leadership ultimately "take moral and political responsibility for what happened." A 2006 Grenada Today editorial asked, "how come [Coard] wants us to believe after 23 years that he is such an innocent man and wants to only take 'moral responsibility' and not 'criminal responsibility' for the heinous killings?"

== Criticisms and aftermath ==
Some international observers questioned the fairness of the Grenada 17 trial. A pamphlet by Richard Hart, The Grenada Trial: A Travesty of Justice (Committee for Human Rights in Grenada, 1996), denounced the 1986 trial proceedings for not allowing witnesses for the defense or cross-examination of prosecution witnesses. Amnesty International issued a report in 2003 stating that the Grenada 17 should be granted "a prompt, fair and impartial" new trial, and referred to them as "the last of the Cold War prisoners".

In 2001 the Grenada government established a Truth and Reconciliation Commission to help citizens on the island "move on from the deep divisions caused by the revolution and the consequent US invasion". Although many in the country expected the Commission to weigh in on the Grenada 17 controversy, the Commission's final report in 2006 made no specific recommendations in that regard.

It was not until 2009 that every member of the Grenada 17 was released.
