= Hudson Austin =

Grenadian revolutionary and politician (1938–2022)

Chairman of the Revolutionary Military Council of Grenada
- In office 19 October 1983 – 30 October 1983
- Deputy: Liam James and Ewart Layne
- Preceded by: Bernard Coard (as Prime Minister)
- Succeeded by: Nicholas Brathwaite (as Chairman of the Interim Advisory Council)

Personal details
- Born: 26 April 1938 British Windward Islands
- Died: 24 September 2022 (aged 84) St. Georges, Grenada
- Party: New JEWEL Movement

Hudson Austin (26 April 1938 – 24 September 2022) was a Grenadian revolutionary and politician who served as a general in the People's Revolutionary Army of Grenada. After the killing of Maurice Bishop, he formed a military government with himself as chairman to rule Grenada.

== History ==
=== Early life and political career ===
Hudson Austin was a member of the New Jewel Movement in Grenada. He was an early member of the military wing of the party and received military training in Guyana and Trinidad and Tobago along with eleven other Grenadians, sometimes referred to as "the twelve apostles". Austin was unique in this group as he also received training in the Soviet Union. He participated in the 1979 revolution which established the People's Revolutionary Government with Maurice Bishop at its head. After the revolution, Austin was in charge of the military forces of Grenada.

=== 1983 coup d'état ===
In October 1983, factional political issues intensified within the government, most notably Bishop's alleged favoring of rapprochement clashing with Austin's wish for affiliation with the Soviet Union. These conflicts led deputy prime minister Bernard Coard to place Maurice Bishop under house arrest and to take control of the government. Austin supported the action. Conflicts between Austin and Bishop were established early on in the 1979 coup with Austin's wanting to eliminate as many members of the opposition as possible conflicting with Bishop's wish for a bloodless coup. Popular demonstrations afterwards broke out against the detention of Bishop. In the course of one demonstration, Bishop was freed from house arrest. Bishop was eventually executed by army soldiers. Throughout the conflict, Yuri Andropov continued to provide arms to Grenada and did nothing to aid Bishop throughout this ordeal. It has been suggested that Austin and Coard were at least passively supported by the Soviet Union in their ousting of Bishop.

=== As Chairman of the Revolutionary Military Council ===
After the execution of Bishop, Austin disbanded the existing government and formed a military council with himself as chairman that would rule "until normality is restored." The deputy chairmen of the military council were Liam James and Ewart Layne. He was an early member in the New Jewel Movement (NJM). He made a radio announcement in which he claimed Bishop had led a mob to seize Fort Rupert, headquarters of the armed forces, with the intention of eliminating the NJM leadership and the army. As a result, Austin said, "the Revolutionary Armed Forces were forced to storm the fort, and in the process, the following persons were killed: Maurice Bishop, Unison Whiteman, Keith Hayling, Vincent Noel, Jacqueline Creft, Norris Bain and Fitzroy Bain among others." He then announced a four-day total curfew, warning the people, "No one is to leave their house. Anyone violating this curfew will be shot on sight."

=== Invasion of Grenada ===
The military government lasted for six days, until the United States invaded Grenada on 25 October 1983. On 30 October, Austin was arrested, along with all of those in the government and army who were alleged to have either participated in the decision to kill Bishop or were in the army chain of command that carried out the orders. He was sentenced to death along with Coard and the other coup leaders in 1986, but in 1991 their sentences were commuted to life in prison.

=== After 1991 ===
In mitigation pleas made in 2007, while he sought to be released from prison he made no attempt to deny his responsibility for what happened in 1983. In the plea it was said that he "understand(s) the need to satisfy action for loss and suffering and the trauma of the Grenadian people."

Austin was released from prison on 18 December 2008, together with Colville McBarnett and John Ventour. Austin was later diagnosed with Stage 4 cancer, and died on 24 September 2022.

Military offices
| Preceded by Bernard Coard | Chairman of the Revolutionary Military Council of Grenada; 19–25 October 1983 | Succeeded by Nicholas Brathwaite |
