= People's Revolutionary Government =

1979–1983 socialist government of Grenada

Grenada
- 1979–1983
- Flag Coat of arms
- Motto: Ever conscious of God, we aspire, build and advance as one people Workers of the world, unite!
- Anthem: "Hail Grenada" Royal anthem: "God Save the Queen"
- Capital: St. George's
- Common languages: English; Grenadian Creole English; Grenadian Creole French
- Demonym: Grenadian
- Government: Parliamentary monarchy under a communist provisional government
- Monarch
  - 1979–1983: Elizabeth II
- Governor-General
  - 1979–1983: Sir Paul Scoon
- Prime Minister
  - 1979–1983: Maurice Bishop
  - 1983: Bernard Coard
  - 1983: Hudson Austin
- Legislature: None (rule by decree)
- Historical era: Cold War
  - Revolution: 13 March 1979
  - US invasion: 25 October – 2 November 1983

Area
- 1981: 344.5 km^{2} (133.0 sq mi)

Population
  - 1981: 94,052
- GDP (nominal): 1981 estimate
  - Total: $115.7 million
  - Per capita: $1,230
- Currency: Eastern Caribbean dollar
Preceded by	Succeeded by
Grenada	Grenada
- Today part of: Grenada

The People's Revolutionary Government (PRG) was proclaimed on 13 March 1979 after the New JEWEL Movement overthrew the government of Grenada in a revolution, making Grenada the only communist state within the Commonwealth. In Grenada, the revolution is referred to as the "March 13th Revolution of 1979" or simply as "The Revolution". The government suspended the constitution and ruled by decree until a factional conflict broke out, culminating in an invasion by the United States on 25 October 1983.

== Background ==
=== Independence of Grenada and the regime of Sir Eric Gairy ===
Grenada, a 350 km^{2} Caribbean island state located in the Lesser Antilles, gained independence from the United Kingdom in 1974, after a long process. In 1967, the country received the status of an associated state, thus acquiring very high autonomy in the management of its internal affairs. Sir Eric Gairy, a former union leader and leader of the Grenada United Labor Party (GULP), became prime minister and led the Grenadian government during the political process that later resulted in the country's complete independence. Even before then, however, Gairy's government experienced a clear authoritarian drift. In the 1960s, a new generation of intellectuals from the middle classes emerged in Grenada, many of whom trained at British and American universities. Their return to the country coincided with the spread of a strong Black Power movement in the Caribbean, inspired by that of the United States.

Lawyer and revolutionary Maurice Bishop was one of the leaders of a demonstration in 1970 in support of a protest movement that took place at the same time in Trinidad and Tobago; the Grenadian opponents took advantage of this context to denounce the corruption of Gairy's government. A few months later, a movement in support of a nurses' strike turned into a confrontation with the police. Bishop contributed to the defence of the accused and their acquittal. The main opposition was the Grenada National Party (GNP) of former Prime Minister Herbert Blaize, a conservative party with its main support base among the middle class and landowners.

In 1972, Maurice Bishop participated in the founding of the Movement for Assemblies of the People (MAP), formed by intellectuals from the capital, and advocated the replacement of the parliamentary system with local assemblies, inspired by the Ujamaa villages of the African socialist regime of Tanzania. At the same time, the Joint Endeavor for Welfare, Education, and Liberation (JEWEL) was formed and led by economist Unison Whiteman. JEWEL, which mainly campaigned for rural populations, drew large support in the country due to its participation in various social movements. The group, however, was not strictly a political party and did not have a global vision to take power. Conversely, MAP was a more intellectually-structured party, but lacked any real presence outside the capital. In the 1972 elections, the Grenada National Party was defeated, and the radicals concluded that they needed to unite to build a new political force to oppose Gairy.

On 11 March 1973, MAP, led by Maurice Bishop and Kenrick Radix, merged with JEWEL to give birth to the New JEWEL Movement (NJM), which presented itself as an alternative to GULP and the GNP. The NJM manifesto, socialist in spirit, called for the preservation of the country's independence from Europe and the United States, and favoured the role of grassroots communities over state authority. The text rejects the political party system, calling for a "pure democracy" which would involve "all the people, all the time".

In the months following the formation of the NJM, political tension increased on the island. In May 1973, the United Kingdom announced the total independence of Grenada would occur in February 1974. The opposition then mobilised, fearing that Eric Gairy would impose a dictatorship on the country. Political organisations, including the NJM, came together with churches to form the Committee of 22 to organise the protest against Gairy. On 4 November, the NJM brought together 8,000 people during a demonstration called the Popular Congress. A resolution was published which declared Gairy guilty of numerous crimes, including police brutality and embezzlement of public funds.

The Prime Minister reacted strongly. NJM supporters were soon threatened, both by the police and by a group of Gairy's henchmen, known as the Mongoose Gang. The New Jewel Movement, strong from the success of its Popular Congress, then decided to organise a general strike on 18 November. On that day, party leaders, including Maurice Bishop, were arrested and beaten in their cells. In response to the Prime Minister, the Committee of 22, supported by the NJM, launched a general strike, which began on 1 January 1974.

A few weeks before the country's independence, the tensions remained high and the country continued to experience violence. On 21 January, Bishop's father was murdered; several NJM supporters were also killed. The country's economy was paralysed. Gairy's government received financial assistance from the United Kingdom, Trinidad and Tobago, and Guyana to pay civil servants and continue to operate the state until the day of independence. On 7 February 1974, Grenada gained independence as planned, while the leaders of the New JEWEL Movement remained in prison. The strike lasted until the end of March. After their release, the leaders of the NJM had to acknowledge the failure of their action and decided to carry out more methodical militant work to gain power.

=== Rise of the New JEWEL Movement ===
In the following years, the New JEWEL Movement worked to establish itself within the population. Its weekly, the New Jewel, became the most widely read on the island. Although support groups were set up in most villages, penetration into the countryside was more difficult than in urban areas. The influence of GULP and the main union, Grenada Manual & Mental Workers Union (GMMWU), remained strong among peasants and agricultural workers. The NJM succeeded in broadening its activist base, yet it still lacked ideological coherence.

Things changed with the return of the academic Bernard Coard, Bishop's childhood friend, to Grenada. While studying in England, Coard developed links with the British Communist Party; teaching in Trinidad, he was also very close to the Jamaican communists. Even before his final return, Coard organised introductory courses in Marxism during his stay in the country. Installed again in Grenada in September 1976, Coard played an important role in the evolution of the NJM. The party leadership initially refused the request of its high school branch, which wanted the official adoption of Marxism-Leninism. It then evolved significantly towards socialism and Marxism.

The NJM, however, had not yet adopted a primarily anti-capitalist discourse, with its main concern being fighting the government of Sir Eric Gairy. Despite the prevailing corruption, Gairy was considered by his supporters as the symbol of the successful black man and still retained popularity among Grenadian opinion. During the 1976 legislative elections, the New Jewel Movement formed a coalition, the Popular Alliance, with the Grenada National Party of former Prime Minister Herbert Blaize. During the election, the NJM, which managed to obtain a leading place in the coalition, obtained three seats, compared with two for its ally, the GNP. Sir Eric Gairy's party retained the absolute majority in parliament, while Maurice Bishop became the leader of the opposition.

In 1977, while their party was evolving towards Marxism-Leninism, Maurice Bishop and Unison Whiteman visited Cuba and came back greatly impressed. The NJM apparently maintained links with the Communist Party of Cuba during this time.

== Revolution of 1979 ==
Grenadian Revolution
Date	March 12–13 1979
Location	Grenada
Result	Revolutionary victory: Overthrow of Sir Eric Gairy's government; Establishment of the People's Revolutionary Government led by Maurice Bishop

Belligerents
Grenada: Grenada Defence Force; Mongoose Gang	(Grenada) New JEWEL Movement

Commanders and leaders
(Grenada) Eric Gairy	(Grenada) Maurice Bishop (Grenada) Hudson Austin

Faced with the rise in power of the New JEWEL Movement, Sir Eric Gairy at the beginning of 1979 considered taking action and having members of the party's leadership arrested. Political tension was further aggravated when the police discovered barrels of grease intended to transport weapons from the United States to Grenada for the benefit of the NJM. The NJM also formed a small, armed clandestine group placed under the leadership of former prison guard and police officer Hudson Austin, one of the only party officials with military training. The leaders of the NJM, informed of the prime minister's plans against them, managed to escape arrest and lived in hiding for several days.

The NJM took advantage of a trip to New York by Sir Eric Gairy—who was going to the UN to plead in favour of an institution responsible for studying extraterrestrial phenomena—to organise a coup. On 12 March, shortly before midnight, Maurice Bishop, Bernard Coard, Unison Whiteman and other party officials gathered their activists to outline an action plan consisting of deploying NJM militants to storm the barracks where approximately 200 soldiers resided and to take over the radio station and then the country.

In the early hours of 13 March, NJM leaders held a vote to decide whether to carry out the coup. With for and against tied (Hudson Austin and Bernard Coard having voted for, and Maurice Bishop and another executive against), an additional executive, George Louison, took part in the decision and voted for the insurrection, which instigated the launch of the revolution. The operation was carried out by 46 NJM militants, some very young, with only 21 guns among them. The barracks were taken over at four in the morning and the buildings attacked with incendiary bombs. The troop was overpowered without difficulty, the soldiers being taken completely by surprise. The radio station was taken without firing a shot and Maurice Bishop was able to launch his appeal to the population, announcing the seizure of power by the revolutionary army.

The executives of Sir Eric Gairy's regime were, for the most part, easily captured; only Gairy's right-hand man, Derek Knight, managed to flee the country aboard a canoe. The insurrection resulted in only two deaths—a senior officer shot dead while drawing his weapon, as well as a police officer. At four o'clock in the afternoon, the revolutionaries took control of the country.

The NJM revolution immediately received broad support from the population, the majority of whom were tired of Gairy's abuses. In the villages, women prepared food for the insurgents; many young people joined the men of the new revolutionary army to carry out patrols. The takeover of the radio by the insurgents played an essential role among the population, to the point that Maurice Bishop subsequently spoke of a "revolution by radio". Around sixty executives of the old regime were incarcerated. The army and the Mongoose Gang were declared dissolved.

Benefiting at the time of the coup from massive support of the population, Bishop was able to proclaim a People's Revolutionary Government (PRG), of which he was the prime minister. The new government was dominated by the New JEWEL Movement, but included members of the country's business bourgeoisie, including those close to the Grenada National Party. Bernard Coard became the finance minister; he was subsequently appointed deputy prime minister. Executives of the Grenada United Labor Party were not subject to any particular persecution, with only a minority of them being removed from their responsibilities in the administration. The country remained a Commonwealth realm, with Queen Elizabeth II still recognised as Grenada's official head of state. Sir Paul Scoon, the governor-general of the island, was also retained in his honorary role, with the new regime wishing to protect the former colonial metropolis. The Catholic Church, which was very present in Grenada, immediately recognised the new power, while the Anglican Church was more reserved, accusing the New JEWEL Movement of having used force to overthrow the government.

== Domestic policy ==
=== Power structures ===
When they took power, the leaders of the New JEWEL Movement, who initiated the revolution in the name of democracy, had no precise idea as to the political model they wanted to propose to the country. The clearest bases for their actions are found in the 1973 manifesto of the NJM, revised in the light of Leninist contributions.

Maurice Bishop declared the end, in Grenada, of the Westminster system inherited from the United Kingdom, as well as of parliamentary democracy. Fifteen days after taking power, the PRG announced, in the "Declaration of the Grenadian Revolution", the "suspension" of the constitution and the dissolution of Parliament, thus granting itself executive and legislative powers. The elections announced by Maurice Bishop were postponed. These decisions caused the first tension between the government and the bourgeoisie of Grenada, the majority of which had applauded the overthrow of Gairy. Bishop pledged to return "as soon as possible" to constitutional rule and to appoint a constituent assembly charged with drafting a new constitution which would be approved by referendum.

A commission responsible for forming new electoral lists was formed. However, People's Law No. 20 of 1979, which was supposed to make it possible to establish the lists, was never promulgated. Popular after its takeover, the New JEWEL Movement could probably have secured an electoral victory, but the PRG refrained from organising the promised elections, subsequently refusing to organise a vote. The Grenada National Party, the NJM's coalition partner, was not banned but was prevented from functioning normally, with the PRG denouncing it as a party of "big shots." When its leader Herbert Blaize tried to organise a meeting, he was mistreated by supporters of the NJM, while the revolutionary army refrained from intervening.

Instead of parliamentary democracy, the Popular Revolutionary Government aimed to rely on a system of "popular power"—or "participatory democracy"—that is, on a set of local assemblies that Maurice Bishop defined, in a press conference, such as village assemblies and workers' assemblies, which would have the task of electing "parish assemblies", which would then elect the parliament and appoint the government subsequently. These statements by Bishop constituted the most precise information ever provided regarding the institutions envisaged by the new regime. The New JEWEL Movement was particularly influenced, in its conceptions, by pro-Soviet Caribbean Marxist theorists: this envisaged the Caribbean the establishment of "national-democratic" political regimes based on a class alliance between the bourgeoisie and the local proletariat. The "national democracy" phase would aim to prevent the development of capitalism in the Caribbean, and then move on to the "socialist construction" phase. This theory, designed by Third World intellectuals, aimed to bypass the phase of development of capitalism in their countries to move directly to that of socialism.

While emphasising the popular character of power, the PRG followed the Leninist strategy of controlling the population by a militant elite: from the first months following the seizure of power, the government of the New JEWEL Movement claimed a monopoly on power by placing reliable executives and activists in all strategic positions. Mass organisations under the authority of the party were formed, such as the National Youth Organization, a youth movement closely controlled by the NJM youth committee. Phyllis Coard, Bernard's wife, chaired the National Women's Organization: the women's branch of the party, founded before the takeover of power but largely developed after 1979. NJM activists created "Parish councils", led by the party branches: seven in number across the country, these councils were intended to be the main instruments of direct democracy in Grenada. Initially open only to party members and supporters, parish councils—which had no legal existence—were quickly opened to all to discuss local problems. The councils first of all benefit from real popular enthusiasm, and the affluence required them to be subdivided into "Zonal councils". Board meetings were frequently divided into workshops to discuss specific topics.

In 1982, local councils lost their importance in favour of Village Coordinating Bureaus (VCBs) responsible for aligning their work with government bodies, local militia and unions. Despite the development of local assemblies, their members were excluded from the decision-making process and, although they could make suggestions, they were unable to challenge government policies, which they were required to approve. "Popular power", therefore, found itself disarmed in the face of the central committee of the New Jewel Movement, which held the real decision-making power even though its members had no other democratic legitimacy than their election by acclamation in 1973. In the population, the initial enthusiasm gradually gave way to hostility, as disagreements with the policies of the People's Revolutionary Government mounted. The negative consequences for the island's economy (notably the drop in the number of tourists) caused by the deterioration of relations with the United States was one of the main causes of discontent.

The disbanded army was replaced by the new People's Revolutionary Army (PRA), under the leadership of Hudson Austin, the latter being promoted to the rank of general. A popular militia was created to support the army in the event of an attack on the island. Thanks to help from Cuba, the People's Revolutionary Army quickly saw its numbers increase from around fifty men to around 2,000, a figure greater than that of all the other armed forces combined in the Antilles region.

The leadership of the New JEWEL Movement, moreover, experienced divisions, with Bernard Coard's faction opposing that of Maurice Bishop. The revolution led by Bishop appeared to be "moderate pro-Castroist." The line defended by Bernard Coard was situated in a more radical communist logic, even Stalinist, on a certain number of points and recommended a more strictly Leninist organisation of the party, which continued after its seizure of power to be led in the manner of an underground movement. Bernard Coard's good mastery of Marxist-Leninist theoretical concepts often allowed him, thanks to the deference of Bishop and his entourage for Leninist analyses, to dominate internal debates within the party leadership. The Bishop and Coard factions, however, had no major disagreement over the pace of the transition to socialism. In 1982, in a speech to the executives of the New JEWEL Movement, Maurice Bishop reaffirmed the "national-democratic" and "anti-imperialist" character of the Grenadian revolution, and his intention to establish a "workers' dictatorship": in this optically, he claimed to want to continue to govern by decree and to exclude the elements of the bourgeoisie and the petty bourgeoisie allied to his regime from power and from the public space, in order to lead Grenada towards the stage of "socialist orientation".

=== Public liberties ===
The regime's repressive tendencies increased over the months. People's Law No. 8, promulgated shortly after the seizure of power, allowed the preventive internment of any person "suspected of presenting a threat to public security". In April 1979, Grenada had 80 political prisoners, the majority of them former collaborators of Gairy. In the months that followed, two events contributed to the radicalisation of security measures. In November 1979, a plot against the government mounted by a former police officer, Wilton de Ravenière, was discovered; in June 1980, during a public meeting, a bomb exploded under the official platform on which Maurice Bishop and other personalities were located. Although the speakers' lives were saved by the concrete slab beneath their feet, three young girls were killed. The plot of November 1979 and the attack of June 1980 triggered an "offensive" by the government against its "enemies", these events being attributed to the presence on the island of counter-revolutionary groups.

Following the bombing, a wave of arrests took place; an anti-terrorism decree stipulates that any suspect in an attack will be tried by a court sitting without a jury and that terrorist activities will be punished by death. Four people were arrested and charged for the attack: during their trial, the judge discovered that the confessions of two of the accused were extracted under torture, and declared their statements inadmissible. The trial was adjourned accordingly: the suspects remained imprisoned and, in December 1983, after the fall of the PRG, were the subject of an amnesty by the Governor-General of Grenada.

While the People's Revolutionary Government of Grenada, unlike other socialist regimes in the Third World, did not practice large-scale violence against its opponents—refraining from executing them or sentencing them to forced labour—the preventive detentions were frequent. Around 3,000 people, out of a population of less than 90,000 for the entire country, were arrested and questioned during the PRG's four years in power, 300 being detained: while a majority of those arrested were only detained for a few days, or even a few hours, the country had, at the end of 1982, around 120 counter-revolutionary prisoners, most of whom had been detained for two years or more, most of them without trial. Winston Whyte, the leader of the United People's Party, a party previously allied with the New JEWEL Movement, was among those imprisoned. In March 1983, taking into account the releases in previous months, Amnesty International recorded 97 political prisoners in Grenada.

More broadly, in terms of public freedoms, the PRG saw its role in Marxist terms, from the angle of a "dictatorship of the proletariat", which would include the right to exercise "limited repression" against "bourgeois" opposition to the revolution. Under Gairy's regime, the opposition did not have access to state media, a situation which did not change under the PRG. As the only radio station on the island (Radio Grenada, renamed after the revolution Radio Free Grenada) was state-owned, its control by the PRG amounted to a status quo. The situation was different concerning the written press, owned by private capital: from the month of September 1979, Bishop accused various newspapers, including the conservative publication Torchlight, of engaging in "acts of destabilization".

The government, therefore, began to destroy the opposition press, giving the New JEWEL Movement a de facto monopoly on information. People's Law No. 81 prohibited private individuals from holding more than 4% of the shares in a newspaper, which was equivalent to causing the disappearance of the non-governmental press. A second law, promulgated in June 1981, banned the publishing of a newspaper for a full year, until the adoption of new legislation on press freedom. The government then defined a system of collective ownership of newspapers, equivalent to a mode of self-management of the written press; the lack of precision regarding the timetable for a transition to collective ownership of newspapers, however, contributed to the fears at the time that this program was only a pretext to extend state control over the press. The PRG's policy on freedom of information was all the more poorly perceived as the owners of private newspapers provided maximum publicity to the repressive measures to which they were subject. In contrast, the collective ownership program of the media has little impact on the population.

=== Economy ===
On the economic level, the Revolutionary Government operated in a very unfavorable context: Grenada, whose economy relies largely on tourism (the island mainly produces nutmeg and bananas), suffers from both the consequences of Hurricane Allen and the fall in export prices. After the revolution, the PRG extended state control over the economy, following recipes inspired by those of communist regimes: trade, infrastructure and non-agricultural businesses were largely nationalised; although agriculture, predominant in the Grenadian economy, remained essentially in the private sector, government representatives were appointed to supervise agricultural exports. The government aimed to develop a mixed economy dominated by the state sector with a view of replacing the market economy in force under Gairy's government and promoting the fastest possible transition to socialism. The PRG, nevertheless, showed itself incapable of setting up a real planned economy, due in particular to a lack of qualified executives, despite the presence of advisors from other Caribbean countries or socialist countries. Due to the increased emphasis on planning, prices were generally out of sync with supply and demand.

The deterioration of the economic environment made market mechanisms less effective, while planning failed to achieve the objectives set and Grenada is, more broadly, afflicted with all the ills specific to developing countries (lack of natural resources, qualified personnel, technologies and absence of manufacturing industry). The period 1979–1983 was, as a whole, marked by economic dysfunctions. A certain number of PRG reforms, however, were having positive effects: the authorities set up a system of financial and equipment loans for farmers, and agricultural cooperatives to develop the activity. Bishop's government also worked to develop infrastructure, notably by building new roads.

=== Social policies ===
During the rule of the PRG Grenada achieved progress in many areas including but not limited to women's rights, education, housing, health, and the economy. By the end of the Gairy regime the economy was experiencing negative growth, per capita income was falling; when the PRG came to power, however, this quickly changed and the economy began to experience modest growth. The World Bank in its August 4, 1982 dated report "Economic Memorandum on Grenada" (No. 3825-GRD) noted that "Grenada has been one of the very few countries in the Western Hemisphere that continued to experience per capita growth during 1981." According to Payne, Sutton and Thorndike, GDP per capita almost doubled from 1978 to 1983, income tax was also abolished for 30 percent of the lowest paid workers. Unemployment was also sharply reduced from 49% in 1979 to 14% in 1983 at a time when most other countries in the region had an unemployment rate of 20 to 30%. The number of doctors also increased from 1 per 4,000 in 1979 to 1 per 3,000 in 1982, the infant mortality rate was reduced from 29 to 14.8, and the literacy rate increased from 85% in 1978 to 90% in 1981. In regards to women's rights, sexual exploitation of women in exchange for work was outlawed, equal pay for equal work was passed and mothers were guaranteed three months’ maternity leave, two of which were paid, as well as a return to the same job they had left.

Concerning educational policy, the PRG worked to improve the level of education in Grenada, where 7% of the population was illiterate: a Center for Popular Education (CPE) was created to coordinate government education initiatives, including literacy campaigns. Efforts are being made to improve school results and programs. Learning Grenadian Creole is permitted at school. The PRG's tendency to marginalise religious education and, more broadly, the role of the church—particularly the Catholic—in education, contributed to the deterioration of relations between the government and the Grenadian clergy. The Popular Revolutionary Government had come to consider the Grenadian churches (Catholic, Protestant and Anglican) as direct adversaries: a report from the Grenadian authorities described the clergy as the most dangerous of potential counter-revolutionary centers and recommended continuous surveillance of the churches, as well as the development of relations between the PRG and the liberation theology movement. In the health sector, Bishop's government strived to improve the services available: in this area it benefits in particular from aid from Cuba, which provided a dozen specialist doctors to Grenada, thus doubling the number of specialists in the country. Maternity leave and public health centres were also introduced.

== Foreign policy ==
After the 1979 revolution, the governments of Caribbean countries met to decide what to do with the new government, questioning the degree of left-wing orientation of the PRG. George Louison was sent as an emissary by Maurice Bishop to reassure the leaders of the Caribbean states and the Grenadian revolutionary government multiplied the assurances of its good faith to obtain the recognition of its neighbours; recognition of the People's Revolutionary Government would lead to the need for Grenada's return to a constitutional standard as the States of the Caribbean Community (CARICOM). During the first months of its existence, the People's Revolutionary Government of Grenada seemed to announce a "left turn" in the Caribbean. In July 1979, a mini-summit was held in Grenada which brought together, alongside Maurice Bishop, two other Labor heads of government who came to power for a few months: Oliver Seraphin, Prime Minister of Dominica and Allan Louisy, Prime Minister of Saint Lucia.

Also among the Grenadian government's main allies was Michael Manley, socialist prime minister of Jamaica; but from 1980, Manley's electoral defeat deprived Maurice Bishop of this important support. Séraphin and Louisy also quickly left power. More broadly, the expected shift to the left in the region did not occur. Right-wing parties won the elections in Saint Vincent and the Grenadines and Antigua and Barbuda, where parties close to the New JEWEL Movement are eliminated. Diplomatic relations with Trinidad and Tobago was cold, and those with Guyana was deteriorating. The Grenadian government, therefore, found itself politically isolated in the region.

=== Alliance with Cuba, tensions with the United States ===
As soon as it came to power, the New JEWEL Movement government established secret links with Cuba, which very quickly supplied the former with weapons. With the United States, relations went through several phases, only to deteriorate quickly. After his overthrow, Eric Gairy denounced a communist coup in his country and tried to obtain American aid: the State Department nevertheless tended to rely on the United Kingdom for analysis of the situation. The PRG quickly sent a request to the United States for economic and military aid, which remained unanswered; the new regime wished above all to protect itself against an attempt at a comeback by Gairy and Bishop announced that he will request arms from the United States, the United Kingdom, Canada and Venezuela: the Grenadian Prime Minister tried in particular, before to publicise his contacts with Cuba, to assess the international political climate around his regime.

On 22 March 1979, the United States recognised the new regime, after concluding that a return to power for Gairy was not possible; the American administration nevertheless emphasised that it supported the request of the Caribbean states for a return to political normality. On 23 March, the United States, wishing to establish good relations with the PRG, sent their ambassador to the Eastern Caribbean, Franck Ortiz, to Grenada: the first interview went well; the American ambassador, while announcing aid projects to Grenada, encouraged NJM leaders to organise elections. During his second trip to Grenada, Ortiz found Bishop and his government particularly worried about a possible coup mounted by Gairy from his exile. The ambassador assured Maurice Bishop and Bernard Coard that the United States had no intention of allowing Gairy to raise an army and invade Grenada from their territory; but the diplomat made several blunders, firstly by warning Bishop and Coard of the risks of a drop in tourism in their country in the event of political unrest, then by giving them a press release indicating that the United States would take a dim view a military alliance of Grenada with Cuba, even with a view to defending itself against a possible attack. This interview profoundly affected American-Grenadian relations: Bishop and Coard considered these warnings as threats, even as a mark of contempt and racism on the part of the ambassador.

On 13 April, Bishop delivered an offensive speech vigorously denouncing American interference. The next day, diplomatic relations were opened with Cuba with contacts between the regimes of Fidel Castro and Maurice Bishop now coming to light. The United States saw its fears confirmed by this rapprochement, while the Grenadian government saw the American attitude as a manifestation of imperialism. Relations between the two countries continued to be strained throughout the rest of 1979 until the end of Jimmy Carter's term in the White House, notably when several American citizens were briefly arrested in Grenada.

Ties between Cuba and Grenada grew rapidly, facilitated by the excellent personal relations between Fidel Castro and Maurice Bishop. The head of the NJM expressed great admiration for the Cuban leader, who in return showed him almost paternal affection. Cuba supplied weapons to the new Grenadian regime and sent advisors to form the People's Revolutionary Army of Grenada. In June 1979, a cooperation agreement between the two countries was concluded, providing for assistance from Cuba to developments in Grenada's health sector and infrastructure. A new agreement, this time secret, on military cooperation, was signed in 1981. Cuba helped Grenada in particular to build a new airport intended to develop tourism on the island. Several hundred Cuban aid workers, most of them who came to help with the construction of the airport, settled on the island; a large number of them were also reservists of the Cuban Armed Forces and had military training. Cuba then installed a contingent of active military personnel in Grenada as well as agents of its security services. In addition to its alliance with Cuba, the government of Maurice Bishop also received, in 1980, the support of Daniel Ortega, Sandinista president of Nicaragua, who announced his solidarity with the revolution in Grenada.

=== Relations with other communist countries ===
In addition to links with Latin American left-wing governments, Maurice Bishop told the central committee of the New JEWEL Movement that he aimed to maintain good relations with all countries of the world, with the exception of "fascist dictatorships". Accordingly, cooperative relations soon developed with the communist regimes, mainly through Cuba: the regime of Fidel Castro played intermediary to help Grenada, whose means of communication with foreign countries were limited to conclude agreements with the USSR, Vietnam and Czechoslovakia. The USSR, which did not consider the Caribbean as a priority area of action, was cautious regarding the Grenadian revolution and took six months to establish diplomatic relations with the New JEWEL Movement regime, which it was done mainly at the insistence of the Cubans and after ensuring the stability of Bishop's government: the joint communiqué of the USSR and the PRG was signed in Havana.

Cooperation between the USSR and Grenada, however, remained limited, particularly on the economic level—with Cuba remaining the main partner of the Grenadian government. The New JEWEL Movement, nevertheless, aimed to develop its relations with the Soviet government, in particular to act as a relay between the USSR and the Caribbean left. In July 1982, a cooperation agreement was signed between the NJM and the Communist Party of the Soviet Union, providing for an exchange of experiences and training between cadres of the two parties. Similar cooperation agreements were signed with the Cuban, Bulgarian and East German communist parties. Various Eastern Bloc countries sent aid workers. In the early 1980s, a series of secret agreements were signed between the USSR and Grenada, providing Soviet aid in equipment and weapons worth 20 million rubles. After a visit by Bernard Coard to Prague, Czechoslovakia supplied arms to Grenada in exchange for an agreement providing for the delivery, from 1984, of 80 tonnes of nutmeg per year.

North Korea undertook to deliver weapons, ammunition and 6,000 uniforms to Grenada. The agreements with the USSR also provided for the training of Grenadian soldiers on Soviet soil. Armament deliveries from various communist countries were largely planned for 1986, and only part of the planned Soviet aid arrived in 1983 at the time of the fall of the regime.

=== Attempt at rapprochement with the United States ===
Relations with the United States continued to be very tense—Maurice Bishop's support for the Soviet intervention in Afghanistan finally deteriorated them at the beginning of 1980—and was, particularly after the election of Ronald Reagan as president, marked by a series of aggressive declarations from both sides. The construction of the new airport with the help of Cuba particularly worried the American government, which feared it was to be used for military manoeuvres. In April 1982, Ronald Reagan went to Jamaica and Barbados: he met various Caribbean heads of government, whose support he tried on this occasion to secure against the Grenadian government. Reagan's initiative did not, however, meet with great success, with the majority of Caribbean Community governments wishing instead to improve their relations with the PRG after the tensions of 1981. The Grenadian government, for its part, came to fear an American invasion on its soil: in March 1983, manoeuvres by the US Navy in Caribbean waters alarmed Maurice Bishop enough to make him leave the summit of the Non-Aligned Movement which he attended in India, to rush back to the country to put the armed forces on alert.

After this episode, the Grenadian Prime Minister was forced to recognise the untenable long-term nature of poor relations with the United States, particularly due to Grenada's dependence on tourism from the United States and Canada; the construction of the new airport, still in progress and intended to revive the country's economy, risked being a complete loss if North American tourists no longer visited. Maurice Bishop proposed to the NJM central committee a moratorium on anti-American statements and strives to restore good relations with the United States. In June 1983, he responded to an invitation from Mervyn M. Dymally, chairman of the Congressional Black Caucus, and went to Washington for a diplomatic visit. Bishop's trip to the United States aimed to give the American establishment and public the image of a responsible head of government, to help revive American tourism in Grenada, but also to establish links between the Government Grenada's popular revolutionary and the black American community. Ronald Reagan, however, did not respond to the request for a meeting sent to him by Maurice Bishop. The latter's visit to the United States also seemed to have contributed to annoy the most radical faction of the New Jewel Movement, which considered diplomatic overtures towards Washington.

== Dissensions within the government ==
Within the People's Revolutionary Government and the New JEWEL Movement, the power struggle between Maurice Bishop and Bernard Coard resulted over the years in the ousting of those close to the Prime Minister. The very contrasting political styles of Bishop and Coard—Bishop who, unlike Coard, enjoyed real popularity in public opinion, mainly sought consensus within the party and relied on his popularity and his personal charisma, while Coard acted in the manner of an "apparatchik" attached to the notion of democratic centralism—made the Prime Minister vulnerable to the manoeuvres of his No. 2. The personal ambition of Bernard Coard, who considered himself more intelligent and more qualified than Maurice Bishop, seemed to have played a driving role in triggering the final crisis, more than any other objective political factor. One thesis is that the Soviets, during the coup, "remotely guided" the radical faction of Bernard Coard deemed closer to their interests, but this element has not however been proven; the Coard tendency seemed to have developed more links with the USSR while the Bishop tendency was closer to Cuba: the reality, or seriousness of a possible conflict of interests in Grenada between the USSR and Cuba have not been determined.

In October 1982, Kenrick Radix, minister of industrial development and close ally of Bishop, and Caldwell Taylor, ambassador to the UN, were excluded from the party's central committee. Radix, convinced of being the victim of a plot intended to weaken the Prime Minister, then resigned from the NJM and announced his intention to leave the government within a year. Coard, second in the NJM hierarchy, also announced his resignation from the central committee, expressing his dissatisfaction with the inability of the party leadership to adopt a truly Leninist line. Subsequently, the animosity of certain executives towards the Prime Minister increased when they learned that during an interview with George Chambers, head of government of Trinidad and Tobago, Bishop was said to have been ready to organise elections; Chambers would also have, on this occasion, encouraged him to release political prisoners. In September 1983, an extraordinary session of the NJM governing bodies was convened at the request of Lt. Col. Liam James. Several young executives strongly attacked Maurice Bishop, whom they accuse, among other things, of being incapable of providing the party with a "solid Marxist-Leninist base". Coard's supporters proposed a motion establishing joint leadership of the party, with Maurice Bishop to share power with Bernard Coard: the decision was put to a vote—representing the first internal vote in the history of the NJM—and adopted by nine votes to one, with George Louison voting against and Maurice Bishop, Foreign Minister Unison Whiteman and trade union leader Fitzroy Bain abstaining. Tension remained extreme in the weeks that followed: Bishop, who considered joint leadership untenable, feared being assassinated by the faction led by Coard and his wife Phyllis.

== End of the government ==
=== Internal putsch and death of Maurice Bishop ===
Maurice Bishop, accompanied by Unison Whiteman and George Louison, then travelled to Czechoslovakia and Hungary to obtain more economic aid from the Eastern Bloc. After a detour to Cuba on his return trip, he arrived in Grenada on October 8, and discovered that he could no longer enter his official residence. The Grenadian Prime Minister then believed that the Coards had implemented the plot against him: one of his bodyguards, Errol George, began to spread the rumour that Bishop risked being assassinated. The central committee met on 12 October to examine the conspiracy rumours, and Bishop denied being behind them. He then wrote a message, intended to be read on the airwaves of the Radio Free Grenada station, denying the rumours. The central committee then decided to place Maurice Bishop under house arrest, officially for his own safety and to protect him from "counter-revolutionaries". The next day, a general assembly of party activists was held in the presence of 250 to 300 people. The meeting took place in a hateful atmosphere: Bishop was accused of being a "petty-bourgeois opportunist" incapable of leading the country towards socialism, and of not wanting to establish joint leadership of the party. Bishop then took the stand and admitted his failings to democratic centralism, while expressing doubts about the feasibility of joint leadership. Erroll George was summoned to appear and reiterate his accusations regarding the plot against Bishop; the latter remained silent which was interpreted as an admission of guilt in disseminating the coup d'état thesis. The central committee decided to keep the Prime Minister in detention until light is shed on the origin of the rumour. Jacqueline Creft, Minister of Education and Bishop's companion, was also locked up with him.

On 14 October, Selwyn Strachan, Minister of Mobilisation, went to the offices of the Free West Indian newspaper and announced that the Prime Minister was dismissed and that Bernard Coard now led the country. The news spread immediately and the entire population soon became aware of the crisis. The confusion was then extreme in Grenada: Bernard Coard, in an attempt to repair Strachan's blunder and calm the supporters of Maurice Bishop, announced his resignation, but other information presented him as still being in power. Fidel Castro, without interfering in Grenadian affairs, made his concerns known. The USSR, for its part, remained in suspense, its ambassador on the spot apparently content to ask which, Bishop or Coard, is "the more Marxist". Supporters of Maurice Bishop in the NJM apparatus mobilised: Kenrick Radix organised a demonstration in support of Bishop, but he was arrested in the evening.

On 15 October, the armed forces issued a communiqué accusing Bishop of failing to comply with party discipline and warning that they would not tolerate any disorder; the next day, General Hudson Austin spoke on the radio, accusing Maurice Bishop of dictatorial drift. Disorder reigned in Grenada and Bishop's many supporters among the population demonstrate against Coard and the party's central committee, while meetings organised by Bishop's opponents turn into a fiasco. Unison Whiteman, who was attending a UN session, rushed back to Grenada, fearing that the serious crisis the revolution was experiencing would turn into a "bloodbath". Whiteman and George Louison attempted to negotiate with Coard and Strachan, arguing about the risk of foreign intervention in Grenada, but Coard, who considered himself assured of victory thanks to the support of the party and the army, did not take this warning seriously, arguing that "imperialism" is currently too weak. Unison Whiteman then went into hiding; George Louison tried to organise a demonstration, but he was arrested.

The agitation did not abate in the days that followed and, on October 19, a crowd of supporters of Maurice Bishop took over his residence and freed the Prime Minister, as well as Jacqueline Creft. Bishop was carried in triumph on the shoulders of his supporters, who paraded through the streets of Saint-Georges; the Prime Minister then led the crowd towards the Fort Rupert military base, located near the city's port, in order to take control of it. There, Bishop convinced the sentries to welcome him and his supporters, but a Soviet-made troop transport vehicle quickly arrived containing soldiers of the revolutionary who opened fire on the crowd. In the exchange of fire between supporters and opponents of Maurice Bishop, around 29 people were killed and around a hundred injured, although some versions speak of 140 dead. Maurice Bishop was captured: he and seven other prisoners, including Unison Whiteman, Fitzroy Bain and Jacqueline Creft, were gathered in the courtyard of the building. Shortly after, an officer returned with instructions and told them that their execution had been decided by the central committee of the party; the eight prisoners—including Jacqueline Creft, seven months pregnant—were shot with machine guns. An officer finished off Maurice Bishop by slitting his throat with a knife.

In the hours that followed, Hudson Austin announced that he was taking power at the head of a "Revolutionary Military Council" made up of sixteen soldiers. Bernard Coard made no public appearance. Conflicting rumours swirled about him, some claiming that he was in fact leading the new government, others that he had been ousted by Austin. The latter spoke on the radio the same evening, announced the "victory" of the People's Revolutionary Army over the "reactionary and right-wing opportunist forces" and decreed a four-day curfew in force 24 hours a day throughout the country, specifying that any person violating this instruction would be shot on sight.

=== International intervention ===
The events in Grenada aroused unanimous indignation among the governments of the Caribbean Community. The isolated Revolutionary Military Council was all the more feverish as an American naval squadron, en route to Lebanon then at war, diverted its route towards Grenada. The governments of the countries of the Organization of Eastern Caribbean States decided on October 22, under the leadership of Dominica and Saint Lucia, on the principle of military intervention. The same day, Ronald Reagan was informed of the intervention project, which appeared to the American administration as an opportunity to roll back communism in the region. Lieutenant Colonel Oliver North was responsible, at the National Security Council, for overseeing operations related to Grenada.

The Department of Defense expressed reservations because of the risk of losses, but the attack in Beirut on 23 October convinced the Reagan administration of the need to demonstrate its response capabilities. The invasion of Grenada, codenamed Operation Urgent Fury, was launched on 25 October: President Reagan cited, among his motivations, the protection of the thousand American citizens who were in Grenada, and the need to restore law and the order after the takeover of the "leftist gangsters". Margaret Thatcher, Prime Minister of the United Kingdom, was not informed until after the outbreak of the invasion.

The troops responsible for the operation (the 7,300 American military personnel were supported by a small Caribbean expeditionary force, made up of troops from Antigua and Barbuda, Barbados, Dominica, Jamaica, Saint Lucia and Saint Vincent and the Grenadines) took almost total control of the island in three days. Hudson Austin and Bernard Coard were arrested. During the invasion, fighting took place between American and Cuban troops: a small part of the Cuban soldiers present on the island put up strong resistance—24 of them were killed—the majority showed little combativeness and surrendered quickly, which Fidel Castro experienced very badly. The majority of Western countries criticised this intervention carried out without the approval of the UN Security Council. The operation was then condemned by a vote of the General Assembly. The United Kingdom, while refraining from officially condemning the American initiative, was showing its irritation at not having been kept informed of the intervention in a country of which Queen Elizabeth II was then the head of state.

Fidel Castro, for his part, attacked both the American invasion and the authors of the coup against Bishop, comparing the latter to Pol Pot. American forces informed the public that large stockpiles of weapons had been seized during the invasion and presented them, with some exaggeration in the figures, as proof of the danger which weighed on the region. Large stocks of internal documents of the PRG and the NJM were confiscated and classified in the United States under the collective name of Grenada documents, constituting a documentary fund on the functioning of the regime.

Grenada was administered by the occupying forces until 31 October 1983, when Nicholas Brathwaite was appointed by the Governor-General to head the Interim Advisory Council, which acted as an interim government. The constitution was restored. The country then rebuilt its political life. Kendrick Radix and George Louison brought together supporters of the moderate wing of the New Jewel Movement under the umbrella of a new party, the Maurice Bishop Patriotic Movement. Ian St Bernard, former member of the central committee of the NJM, reformed the new party by denouncing the MBPM executives as traitors: the new NJM, whose influence was reduced to almost nothing, mainly had supporters in Grenadian communities from abroad. Legislative elections took place in December 1984, and resulted in a large victory for the New National Party, which former head of government Herbert Blaize created by merging the old Grenada National Party and several other movements. The Maurice Bishop Patriotic Movement attracted 5% of the votes and obtained no elected representatives. Blaize became Prime Minister for the third time.

The trial of 18 people charged with the murder of Maurice Bishop and the seven other prisoners began in June 1985, then was adjourned until March the following year. On 4 December 1986, 17 of the accused were convicted and one acquitted; ten former members of the NJM central committee were sentenced to death, including Hudson Austin, Bernard and Phyllis Coard, Selwyn Strachan and Liam James. The sentences were then commuted to life imprisonment.

== Legacy ==
Despite the controversial nature of his regime, Maurice Bishop continues to be considered, by at least part of Grenada's public opinion, as a political leader worthy of esteem, due to the social reforms undertaken by his government. Pointe Salines Airport, completed after the fall of the PRG, was renamed in 2009 after Maurice Bishop International Airport. The Maurice Bishop Patriotic Movement never managed to regain the success of the New JEWEL Movement, and remained a minority party unrepresented in parliament and subsequently ceased to exist.

The question of the possible release, in the name of national reconciliation, of the "Grenada 17"—that is to say, the people convicted for the 1983 putsch and the death of Maurice Bishop—continued to divide Grenadian public opinion for years. Three of them, including Hudson Austin, were released in 2008. Bernard Coard and thirteen other convicts remained detained until 2009, when, after the Privy Council in London ordered a review of the sentences, the Supreme Court of Grenada authorised their release.

== Government system ==
=== Maurice Bishop Cabinet (1979–1983) ===
Picture	Name	Portfolio	Note
	Elizabeth ll	Queen of Grenada	De jure Head of State
	Maurice Bishop	Prime Minister of Grenada	
	Bernard Coard	Deputy Prime Minister	
	Unison Whiteman	Minister of Foreign Affairs	
	General Hudson Austin	Minister of Defence; Commander of the People's Revolutionary Army (PRA)	
	Major Einstein Louison	Vice Minister of Defence; PRA Chief of Staff	
	Chris DeRiggs	Minister of Health	
	Vincent Noel	Secretary for Home Affairs; President of Bank and General Workers Union (BGWU); VP of Commercial and Industrial Workers Union (CIWU)	
	Jacqueline Creft	Minister of Education; Minister of Women's Affairs	
	Norris Bain	Minister of Housing	
	Don Rojas	Press Secretary to the Prime Minister	

=== Temporary removal the cabinet system ===
After the killing of Maurice Bishop on 19 October 1983, Hudson Austin became Chairman of the Revolutionary Military Council (RMC), which replaced the cabinet system with the Revolutionary Military Council. After he was removed as Prime Minister, the cabinet system was bought back.

=== Revolutionary Military Council (19–25 Oct 1983) ===
Members:

- General Hudson Austin – Chairman (de facto Head of State)
- Lieutenant Colonel Ewart Layne – Chief of Staff, People’s Revolutionary Army
- Liam "Owusu" James – Political Officer, People’s Revolutionary Army
- John Ventour – PRA officer
- Leon Cornwall – PRA officer and NJM Central Committee member
- Colville McBarnette – PRA officer

=== Local government ===
In 1982, local councils lost their importance in favour of Village Coordinating Bureaus (VCBs) responsible for aligning their work with government bodies, local militia and unions.
