= New JEWEL Movement =

Ruling party of Grenada from 1979 to 1983

New Joint Endeavor for Welfare, Education, and Liberation
- Abbreviation: New JEWEL Movement
- Leader: Maurice Bishop
- Founded: 11 March 1973 (53 years, 254 days)
- Dissolved: 29 October 1983 (43 years, 22 days)
- Merger of: Joint Endeavor for Welfare, Education, and Liberation (JEWEL); Organization for Revolutionary Education and Liberation (OREL); Movement for Assemblies of the People (MAP)
- Succeeded by: Maurice Bishop Patriotic Movement
- Headquarters: St. George's
- Newspaper: The New Jewel
- Armed wing: People's Revolutionary Army
- Ideology: Communism; Marxism–Leninism; Revolutionary socialism; Pan-Africanism
- Political position: Far-left
- National affiliation: People's Alliance (1976)
- Colours: Red and white; Red, green and gold (Rastafari colours, only occasionally)
- Slogan: "Forward ever, backward never!" (French: En avant jambes, en arrière jamais!)
- House of Representatives (1976): 4 / 15 (27%)

Party flag

The New Joint Endeavor for Welfare, Education, and Liberation, or New JEWEL Movement (NJM), was a Marxist–Leninist vanguard party in the Caribbean island nation of Grenada that was led by Maurice Bishop.

Established in 1973, the NJM issued its manifesto prior to Grenada being granted independence from the United Kingdom in 1974. The NJM took control of Grenada with a bloodless coup in 1979 and ruled by decree as the People's Revolutionary Government until 1983. In October of that year, Bishop and seven of his associates were killed by paramilitaries affiliated with hard-line elements in his own party. Those elements formed a military government, which was quickly deposed by a U.S. invasion later in October.

Like all communist parties abroad, the NJM was a communist party, operated under the Soviet model, organized in a basis of democratic centralism, a political organization principle that combines open internal debate with strict, centralized execution, with the ideologies of Marxism–Leninism alongside with the anti-colonial Pan-Africanism.

== Origin ==
The New JEWEL Movement (NJM) was established on 11 March 1973 as an alliance of (1) the Joint Endeavor for Welfare, Education, and Liberation (JEWEL); (2) the Organization for Revolutionary Education and Liberation (OREL); and (3) the Movement for Assemblies of the People (MAP). Although "JEWEL" was originally an acronym, since then NJM's name has generally been spelled out as "New Jewel Movement".

Maurice Bishop, a young lawyer who had returned to Grenada after being educated in England, and Unison Whiteman, the founder of JEWEL, were elected NJM's Joint Coordinating Secretaries. The party's manifesto was largely drafted by MAP's prominent intellectual, Franklyn Harvey, who had been influenced by the writings of C.L.R. James.

In its early days, Bishop described the NJM as "a political party aimed at raising consciousness and taking political power if the accepted processes didn’t allow for electoral change." The New Jewel newspaper, the party's principal publication, featured the motto: "Not Just Another Society – But a Just Society; Let Those who Labour Hold the Reins."

From 1973 to 1979, the NJM functioned as an opposition party. During those years, the country's political situation became increasingly polarized and violent. For the 1976 general election, the NJM forged an electoral coalition, known as the People's Alliance, with the Grenada National Party and United People's Party. However, the coalition lost to Prime Minister Eric Gairy's ruling Grenada United Labour Party. Many international observers branded the 1976 election as fraudulent. In the late 1970s, the NJM became more militant and formed the National Liberation Army (NLA), also known as "the 12 Apostles".

== Revolution ==
On 13 March 1979, the NJM launched a revolutionary coup against the government of Prime Minister Gairy while he was away visiting the U.S. Within hours, the NJM gained control of the country's military barracks, radio stations, government buildings, and police stations. Maurice Bishop then suspended the constitution and announced that the NJM was now a provisional revolutionary government, the People's Revolutionary Government (PRG), with himself as Prime Minister.

Shortly after taking power, the NJM created the People's Revolutionary Army, granting them "the powers of arrest and search as are vested in the members of the Royal Grenada Police Force."

After the revolution, the NJM described itself as a Marxist–Leninist vanguard party, but not a communist party because it didn't believe it had advanced sufficiently to earn that label. According to the NJM, it "practiced policies to reach a point where a communist party could be formed, but considered themselves unready, due to the party not being led by a proletarian class, and due to the low level of education in Marxist-Leninist politics."

== Foreign policy ==
The new government looked to Cuba for aid since the PRG had a "strained relationship with the United States" right from the outset. One of Bishop's first major projects was to supersede the small Pearls Airport on the north end of the island with a large, modern Point Salines International Airport on the south end. Over 600 Cuban construction workers were brought in to assist in the project.

The NJM also worked closely with Cuba to provide assistance to left-wing revolutionary movements around the world, such as the South West African People's Organization (SWAPO) in Namibia and the Farabundo Martí National Liberation Front (FMLN) in El Salvador.

== Bishop's fall and the American intervention ==
The leaders of the U.S. government, and several other Caribbean nations, expressed concerns about the NJM government because of its close ties with Cuba, its alleged military expansion, and its new airport that could be repurposed as a Soviet-Cuban airbase.

Meanwhile, the NJM ruling party started showing signs of internal dissension as early as July 1982. That's when Deputy Prime Minister Bernard Coard, who was also the country's finance minister, resigned from the Political Bureau of the NJM Central Committee. According to the recollections of Bishop's press secretary Don Rojas, Coard's reason for resigning was that "he was not satisfied with the style of work and the priorities the Central Committee was addressing itself to. He was not more concrete than that." When several Central Committee members pressured Coard to be specific, he refused. Other members—who all came out of the OREL organization and were loyal to Coard (Rojas referred to them as the "OREL clique")—backed his decision and allowed him to resign his party posts while retaining his state posts.

During the next year, Coard worked behind the scenes "to advance the OREL people within the Central Committee to very influential positions. Three of them were elevated to the Political Bureau." By September 1983, the schism in NJM leadership had reached a crisis point. The "Coard faction" voiced their doubts about Prime Minister Bishop's continuing effectiveness and attempted to convince him to accept a power-sharing arrangement with Coard, wherein the two men would be co-equal leaders of the country. After a couple weeks of consideration, Bishop rejected the idea, which precipitated a disastrous sequence of events.

On 13 October, Coard took control of the PRG and placed Bishop under house arrest. Bishop's arrest, once it became known, triggered demonstrations and strikes throughout the country. On 19 October, Bishop was freed by a crowd estimated at 15,000 to 30,000 supporters. Bishop led the crowd to army headquarters at Fort Rupert. Eventually a military force from Fort Frederick (under Coard’s direction) arrived at the headquarters and fighting broke out. Many civilians were killed. Bishop and seven others—Jacqueline Creft, education minister; Norris Bain, housing minister; Unison Whiteman, foreign minister; and close supporters Fitzroy Bain, Keith Hayling, Evelyn Bullen and Evelyn Maitland—were lined up against a Fort Rupert courtyard wall and executed by firing squad. The military transported the bodies to an isolated peninsula known as Calivigny. "Their remains were put in a pit with tires and other debris, and set on fire." The remains of Bishop and the others have never been found.

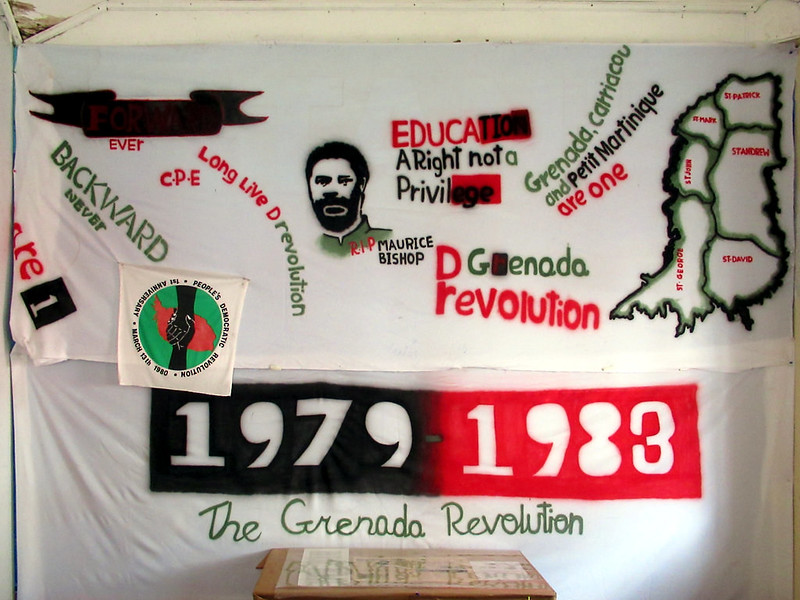
Banner of the Grenada Revolution, located in Grenada National Museum

Immediately after Bishop's execution, Hudson Austin formed a military government. He instituted a 24-hour curfew for four consecutive days under which anyone who left home without authorization would be shot on sight. Six days later, the United States invaded Grenada and overthrew the Austin government. As a consequence of the successful U.S. invasion and occupation, the NJM ceased to exist.

In 1986, eighteen people involved in the murders of Bishop and the seven others were arrested and tried. Seventeen of them (they came to be known as the Grenada 17), including Coard and Austin, were found guilty and given lengthy prison sentences.

== Election results ==
=== House of Representatives ===
Election	Leader	Votes	%	Seats	+/–	Position	Result
1976	Maurice Bishop	18,886 in alliance with GNP and UPP	46.29%	4 / 15	New	2nd	Opposition
