= Bernard Coard =

Prime Minister of Grenada in 1983

Prime Minister of Grenada
- In office 14 October 1983 – 19 October 1983
- Monarch: Elizabeth II
- Governor-General: Paul Scoon
- Deputy: Liam James "Owusu"
- Preceded by: Maurice Bishop
- Succeeded by: Hudson Austin (as Chairman of the Revolutionary Military Council)

Deputy Prime Minister of Grenada
- In office 13 March 1979 – 14 October 1983
- Governor-General: Paul Scoon
- Prime Minister: Maurice Bishop
- Preceded by: Herbert Preudhomme
- Succeeded by: Liam James "Owusu"

Personal details
- Born: Winston Bernard Coard; 10 August 1944 (age 82) Victoria, Grenada
- Party: New JEWEL Movement (1973–1983)
- Spouse: Phyllis Evans (m. 1967; died 2020)
- Education: Grenada Boys' Secondary School; Brandeis University; University of Sussex

Winston Bernard Coard (born 10 August 1944) is a Grenadian politician who served as Deputy Prime Minister in the People's Revolutionary Government (PRG) of the New JEWEL Movement. In 1983, Coard launched a coup within the PRG and briefly took power until he was himself deposed by General Hudson Austin.

== Education ==
Bernard Coard, the son of Frederick McDermott Coard (1893–1978) and Flora Fleming (1907–2004), was born in Victoria, Grenada. He is connected to Grenada's prestigious Cenac family: a first cousin of the Honorable Justice Dunbar Cenac (1939–2023) of the Eastern Caribbean High Court, and a nephew of Dennis Vivian Cenac, a former solicitor in the West Indies Associated States Supreme Court.

Coard was attending the Grenada Boys' Secondary School when he met Maurice Bishop, who was then attending Presentation Brothers' College. Coard and Bishop shared an interest in left-wing politics from an early age. They became friends and in 1962 they co-founded the Grenada Assembly of Youth After Truth. Twice per month, the two would lead political debates in St. George's Central Market Place.

Coard left Grenada for the United States, where he studied sociology and economics at Brandeis University and joined the Communist Party USA. In 1967, he moved to England and studied political economy at the University of Sussex. That year, he married his wife Phyllis while they were students in England, and Coard joined the Communist Party of Great Britain.

== Teaching career ==
He worked for two years as a schoolteacher in London and ran several youth organisations in South London. In 1971, he published a 50-page booklet How the West Indian Child Is Made Educationally Sub-normal in the British School System: The Scandal of the Black Child in Schools in Britain. It explained that British schools had a pervasive bias toward treating white children as normal, which led to black children being labeled as "educationally subnormal" (learning-disabled). Coard wrote:

The [black] children are therefore made neurotic about their race and culture. Some become behaviour problems as a result. They become resentful and bitter at being told their language is second-rate, and their history and culture is non-existent; that they hardly exist at all, except by the grace of whites.

Coard's thesis was widely cited, even long after his revolutionary career, as a summary of the role of institutional racism in the relationship between race and intelligence. In 2005, it was republished as the central article in the collection Tell it Like it is: How Our Schools Fail Black Children. A 2021 BBC One documentary entitled Subnormal: A British Scandal describes the events surrounding the racism of a leaked school report, leading to the publication of Coard's booklet. Produced/directed by Lyttanya Shannon, and executive produced by Steve McQueen, the film features interviews with people who were put into ESN schools, and activists, academics and psychologists and others who worked to expose the scandal at the time, such as Gus John and Waveney Bushell. In a 2021 article, Coard concluded that, 50 years after the ESN scandal was exposed, "the substance ... of the educational suppression of Caribbean-origin children remains".

After completing his doctorate at Sussex, Coard moved to Trinidad. From 1972 to 1974, he was a visiting lecturer at the Institute of International Relations in the University of the West Indies at St. Augustine, Trinidad and Tobago. He also lectured from 1974 to 1976 at the Mona, Jamaica campus of the University of the West Indies. During his stay in Jamaica, he joined the communist Worker's Liberation League and helped draft the League's manifesto.

== Revolution ==
In January 1974, Coard returned to Grenada, which was then in the midst of a popular uprising against the government of Prime Minister Eric Gairy. Coard became active in Grenadian politics. He joined the New Jewel Movement (NJM), the left-wing organization co-founded by his childhood friend Maurice Bishop. Coard ran for and won a parliamentary seat in St. George's in the 1976 elections.

The NJM, led by Bishop, successfully carried out a largely bloodless coup against Eric Gairy's government on 13 March 1979. The radio station, military barracks and police stations were targeted. Before long, the revolutionaries had control of the entire island. The NJM then announced the temporary suspension of the constitution and parliamentary rule.

Influenced by Marxists such as Daniel Ortega and Fidel Castro, Bishop established the People's Revolutionary Government (PRG) of Grenada with himself as Prime Minister. Aid from Cuba allowed the PRG to build Point Salines International Airport, a new international airport with a 10,000-foot (3,000 m) runway. In 1980, Coard headed a delegation to Moscow to formalize Grenada's relations with the Soviet Union.

== Removal and murder of Bishop ==
Bernard Coard served as the PRG's Minister of Finance, Trade and Industry, as well as the Deputy Prime Minister of Grenada under Bishop.

In a factional challenge to Bishop's leadership, Coard ordered Bishop to be placed under house arrest on 13 October 1983, and Coard took control of the government. As word spread of Bishop's confinement, large demonstrations broke out across the island, including one in the capital that freed Bishop from house arrest. He and the demonstrators made their way to the army headquarters at Fort Rupert (known today as Fort George). However, Bishop and seven others, including several PRG cabinet ministers, were killed soon thereafter, under unclear circumstances, by firing squad in the Fort Rupert courtyard. Coard's reign did not last long. He was quickly ousted by General Hudson Austin, who nominally ruled the country for six days.

Just after the 1983 United States invasion of Grenada, Coard, along with his wife Phyllis, Selwyn Strachan, John Ventour, Liam James and Keith Roberts, were arrested.

== Trial and prison ==
They were tried in August 1986 on charges of ordering the murder of Maurice Bishop and seven others. Coard was sentenced to death, but this was commuted to life imprisonment in 1991. He served his sentence in Richmond Hill Prison, where he was engaged in teaching and instructing fellow inmates in many subjects, including economics and sociology.

In September 2004, the prison in which he was held was damaged by Hurricane Ivan and many inmates took the opportunity to flee, but Coard said he chose not to escape, saying he would not leave until his name was cleared.

== Release ==
On 7 February 2007, the London-based Privy Council ordered a re-sentencing of Coard and the others convicted for the 1983 killing of Bishop and some of his cabinet colleagues. The re-sentencing hearing began on 18 June 2007. On 27 June, the judge gave Coard and his fellow defendants a 30-year sentence, which included the time already spent in prison. On 5 September 2009, Coard was released from prison. Upon release he said he did not want to be involved in politics again.

Bernard Coard has three children.

== Publications ==
- How the West Indian Child Is Made Educationally Sub-normal in the British School System: The Scandal of the Black Child in Schools in Britain, 1971.
- The Grenada Revolution: What Really Happened?: Volume 1, 2017.
- Forward Ever: Journey To A New Grenada: 2 (The Grenada Revolution), 2018.
- SKYRED: A Tale Of Two Revolutions: 3 (The Grenada Revolution), 2020.

== See also ==
- Reagan Doctrine
- Grenada 17
- Franklyn Harvey
- Education (film), a dramatization of the events surrounding Coard's critique of the British school system

Preceded by George Hosten	Minister of Finance of Grenada; 1979 – 1983	Succeeded by Allen Kirton
Preceded by Maurice Bishop	Prime Minister of Grenada; 14–19 October 1983	Succeeded by Hudson Austin
