= Unison Whiteman =

Grenadian politician (died 1983)

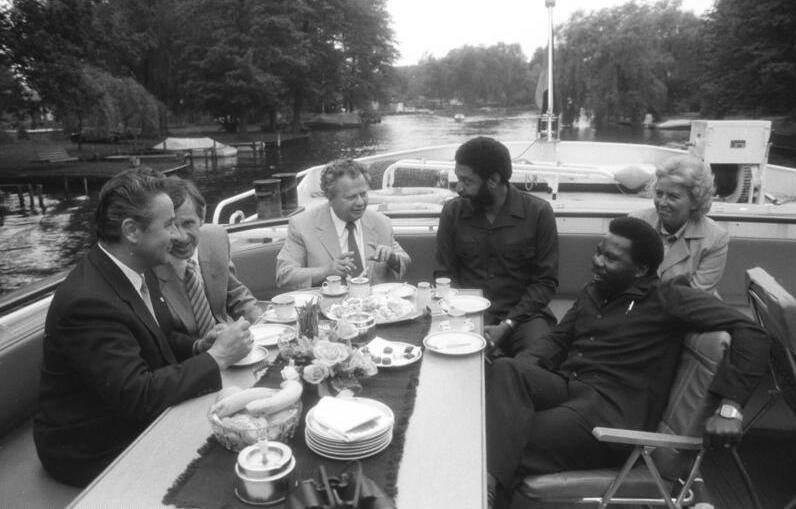
Bishop and Whiteman (right) in East Germany, 1982

Unison Whiteman (1939–19 October 1983) was a Grenadian politician. He was one of the leaders of the revolutionary New JEWEL Movement and Minister of Foreign Affairs in the People's Revolutionary Government from 1981 to 1983.

Whiteman had been educated at Howard University in Washington D.C. earning a BA in Government studies and a MA in economics.

He was executed alongside close friend Maurice Bishop on “Bloody Wednesday”.
