= Maurice Bishop =

Prime Minister of Grenada from 1979 to 1983

The Right Honourable Maurice Bishop
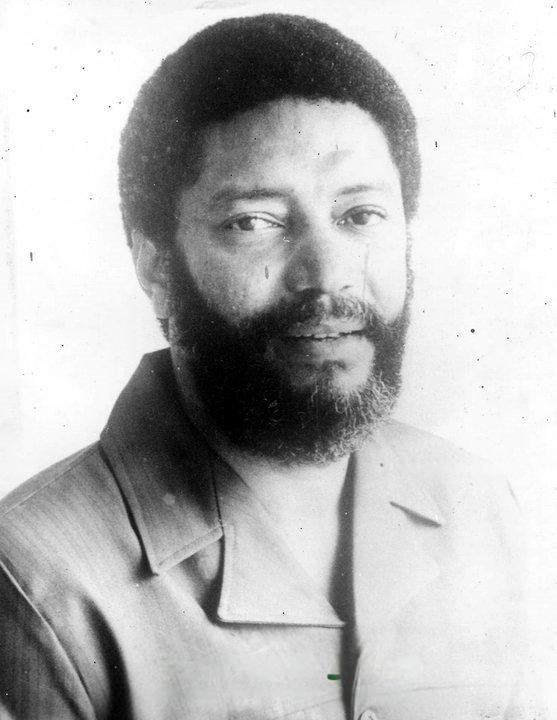

Prime Minister of Grenada (People's Revolutionary Government)
- In office 13 March 1979 – 14 October 1983
- Monarch: Elizabeth II
- Governor General: Sir Paul Scoon (powers limited)
- Deputy: Bernard Coard
- Preceded by: Sir Eric Gairy
- Succeeded by: Bernard Coard

Personal details
- Born: Maurice Rupert Bishop; 29 May 1944 Aruba, Curaçao and Dependencies
- Died: 19 October 1983 (aged 39) Fort Rupert, St. George's, Grenada
- Cause of death: Execution by firing squad
- Party: New JEWEL Movement
- Spouse: Angela Redhead (m. 1966)
- Domestic partner: Jacqueline Creft
- Children: 3
- Parent: Alimenta Bishop (mother)
- Education: London School of Economics; King's College London; Gray's Inn

Maurice Rupert Bishop (29 May 1944 – 19 October 1983) was a Grenadian revolutionary, politician and the leader of the New JEWEL Movement (NJM), a party that sought to prioritise socio-economic development, education and true black liberation. The NJM came to power on 13 March 1979 and ushered in the Grenada revolution and installed the People's Revolutionary Government which removed Prime Minister Eric Gairy from office. Bishop headed the People's Revolutionary Government of Grenada (PRG) from 1979 to 1983. In October 1983, he was deposed as Prime Minister and executed during a coup engineered internally by Deputy Prime Minister Bernard Coard. This quickly led to the demise of the PRG, culminating in the invasion of Grenada by the United States.

== Early life ==
Maurice Rupert Bishop was born on 29 May 1944 on the island of Aruba, then a colony of the Netherlands as part of the Territory of Curaçao. His parents, Rupert and Alimenta Bishop, came from the northeast of Grenada, where Rupert earned five British pence per day. At the end of 1930, to improve his financial position, Rupert moved with his wife Alimenta to Aruba so that he could work in the oil refinery.

Until the age of six, Maurice was raised in Aruba with two older sisters, Ann and Maureen. In 1950, his father took the family back to Grenada and opened a small retail shop in the capital, St. George's. Maurice was sent to study at the Wesleyan elementary school, but after a year Maurice was transferred to the Roman Catholic St George primary and high school. Maurice was already quite tall at the age of nine and was teased because his height made him look much older. As an only son, he was pushed hard by his father to excel. Rupert would demand perfect grades from Maurice. When the family purchased a car, his mother expected him to walk to school like the others.

For his secondary education, Bishop received one of the four government scholarships for study at the Roman Catholic Presentation Brothers' College. He was elected president of the Student Council, of the Discussion Club, and of the History Study Group, along with editing the newspaper Student Voice and participating in sports. As he recalled, "Here I had much interest in politics, history and sociology." He established contacts with students from the Anglican Grenada Boys' Secondary School, his own school's competitors. He was an ardent supporter of the West Indies Federation, established in 1958, and the ideas of Caribbean nationalism. He also recalled the great interest that the 1959 Cuban Revolution aroused in him: "it did not matter what we heard on the radio or read in the colonial press. For us, it comes down to the courage and legendary heroism of Fidel Castro, Che Guevara. ...Nothing could overshadow this aspect of the Cuban Revolution."

In those same years, Bishop and his colleagues became interested in reading the works of Julius Nyerere and Frantz Fanon. Shortly before graduation, in early 1962, Bishop and Bernard Coard, a youth leader from Grenada Boys' Secondary School, created the Grenada Assembly of Youth Fighting for Truth. It was intended to raise political awareness among the island's youth through lively discussions over pressing issues. Members gathered on Fridays in St. George's main square and arranged open political debates among the people. Both friends and enemies celebrated Bishop's charisma and oratory skills, including his clever use of humour when making arguments. In 1962, Bishop graduated with a Principal's Gold Medal for "outstanding academic and overall ability".

== Education in England ==
The activities of the Grenada Assembly ended the following year when Bishop and the other Assembly leaders left for universities in Europe and the US In December 1963, the 19-year-old Bishop arrived in England to study law at the University of London. Coard meanwhile travelled to the US to study economics at Brandeis University. In 1966, Bishop received a Bachelor of Law degree at Gray's Inn in London. He often worked in the city as a postman or vegetable packer. From 1963 to 1966, he was president of the Students Association of Holborn College and in 1967 headed the association of students of the Royal College. While studying Grenadian history, Bishop focused on anti-British speeches and the life of slave revolt leader Julien Fédon, the head of the 1795 uprising. In 1964, Bishop participated in the UK's West Indian Standing Conference (WISC) and Campaign Against Racial Discrimination (CARD). He visited communist Czechoslovakia and the German Democratic Republic. During this period, he studied the works of Marx, Lenin, Stalin, and Mao Zedong. Bishop was particularly impressed by Julius Nyerere's Ujamaa: Essays on Socialism (published by Oxford University Press in 1968) and the Arusha Declaration of 1967.

From 1967 to 1969, Bishop worked on his thesis, "Constitutional Development of Grenada". However, he left it unfinished because of disagreements with his thesis supervisor in assessing the 1951 disturbances and general strike in Grenada. In 1969, Bishop received a law degree and became one of the founders of the Legal Aid Office of the West Indies community in London's Notting Hill Gate. This was volunteer work; his main source of income came from his job in the civil service as a surtax examiner. During his education in England, Bishop corresponded with Grenadian friends and developed a two-year plan of action upon his return home. The plan called for temporary withdrawal from his lawyer duties in order to co-create an organisation capable of taking power on the island.

== Return to Grenada and further political career ==
Returning to Grenada in December 1970, Bishop provided legal defence for striking nurses at St. George's General Hospital, who hoped to improve conditions for patients. He was arrested along with 30 other strike supporters. All were acquitted after a seven-month trial. In 1972, Bishop helped organise a conference in Martinique that strategised actions for liberation movements. The philosophy of Julius Nyerere and his Tanzanian socialism were guiding elements for the Movement for Assemblies of the People (MAP), which Bishop helped organise after the elections of 1972. Bishop and co-founders Kenrick Radix and Jacqueline Creft were interested in steering MAP toward construction of popular institutions centered in villages, to facilitate broad participation in the country's affairs.

In January 1973, MAP merged with the Joint Endeavour for Welfare, Education and Liberation (JEWEL) and the Organization for Revolutionary Education and Liberation (OREL) to form the New JEWEL Movement (NJM). Bishop and Unison Whiteman, the founder of JEWEL, were elected NJM's Joint Coordinating Secretaries.

=== "Bloody Sunday" ===
On 18 November 1973, Bishop and other leaders of the New Jewel Movement were driving in two cars from St George's to Grenville, where they were to meet with businessmen of the city. Police officers under Assistant Chief Constable Innocent Belmar overtook Bishop's motorcade. Nine people, including Bishop, were captured, arrested and beaten "almost to the point of death" by Belmar's police aides and by the paramilitary Mongoose Gang. In prison the arrested men shaved their beards, revealing Bishop's broken jaw. 18 November 1973 became known in Grenada as "Bloody Sunday".

=== "Bloody Monday" ===
Bishop joined a mass demonstration against Prime Minister Gairy on 21 January 1974. As Bishop's group returned to Otway House, they were pelted with stones and bottles by Gairy's security forces, who also used tear gas. Maurice's father Rupert was leading several women and children away from the danger when he was shot in the back and killed at the door of Otway House. The perpetrators were members of the Mongoose Gang who took orders from Gairy and "carried out campaigns of terror ... against the New JEWEL Movement and against the Bishop family in particular." 21 January 1974 became known in Grenada as "Bloody Monday".

After this traumatising event, Bishop said, "we [the NJM] realized that we were unable to lead the working class" since the party had no influence in city workers' unions or among the rural folk loyal to Gairy. With his colleagues, Bishop developed a new strategy, shifting focus from propaganda and mobilising anti-government demonstrations toward the organisation of party groups and cells.

=== Independence Day ===
On 6 February 1974, the day before the proclamation of the independent state of Grenada, Bishop was arrested on charges of plotting an armed anti-government conspiracy. He was taken to the Fort George prison. Police said that while searching his house they found weapons, ammunition, equipment and uniforms, along with a plan to assassinate Eric Gairy in a nightclub, and a scheme for setting up guerrilla camps. Two days later, Bishop was released on $125 bail, and fled briefly to North America. On 29 March 1974, he was in Guyana participating in a meeting of the Regional Steering Committee of the Pan-African Congress. He also continued his law practice. In October 1974, he defended Desmond "Ras Kabinda" Trotter and Roy Mason who were accused of murdering an American tourist.

=== Leader of the Opposition ===
In 1976, Bishop was elected to represent St. George's South-East in Parliament. From 1976 to 1979, he held the position of Leader of the Opposition in the House of Representatives of Grenada. As such, he challenged the government of Prime Minister Gairy and his Grenada United Labour Party (GULP), which maintained power by threat and intimidation and by fraudulent elections. In May 1977, Bishop made his first visit to Cuba. He travelled there with Unison Whiteman as leaders of the NJM and guests of the Cuban Institute of Friendship with People (ICAP).

== Premiership ==
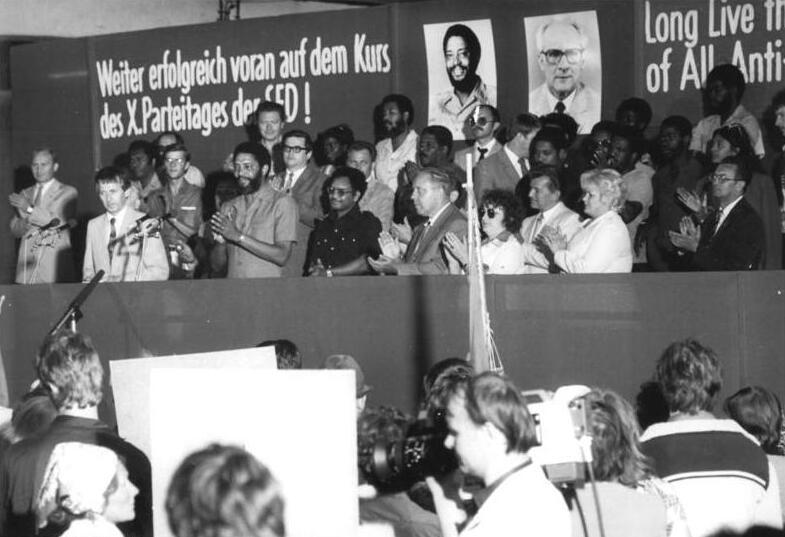
Bishop in Bautzen, East Germany, 1982

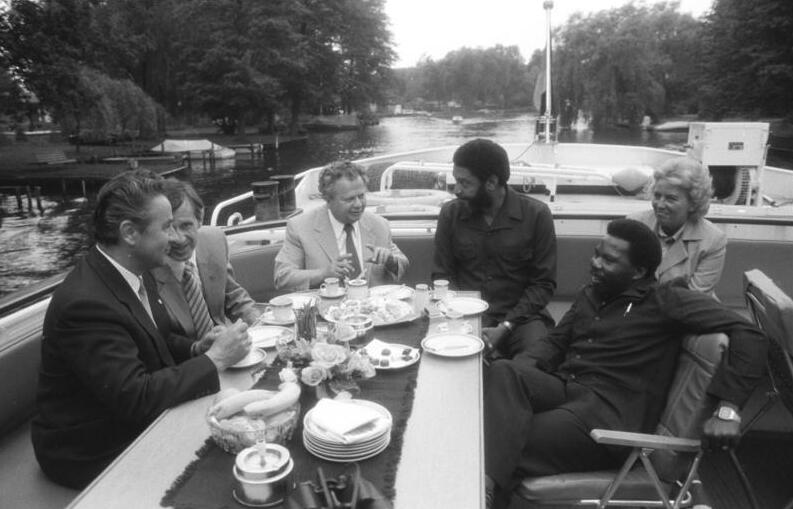
In East Berlin, 1982

In 1979, Bishop's party staged a revolution and deposed Gairy, who was out of the country addressing the United Nations. Bishop became Prime Minister of Grenada and suspended the constitution.

After taking power, Bishop established a partnership with Cuba. He initiated a number of projects in Grenada, most significantly, the building of a new international airport on the island's southern tip (renamed in his memory in May 2009). Financing and labour for the construction of the airport came from Cuba, although most of the airport's infrastructure was designed by European and North American consultants. US President Ronald Reagan accused Grenada of intending to use the new airport's long "airstrip" as a waypoint for Soviet military aircraft.

Among Bishop's core principles were workers' rights, women's rights, and the struggle against racism and apartheid. Under Bishop's leadership, the National Women's Organization was formed which participated in policy decisions along with other social groups. Women were given equal pay and paid maternity leave. Sex discrimination was made illegal. Organisations for education (Centre for Popular Education), health care, and youth affairs (National Youth Organization) were also established. Despite its achievements, Bishop's government would not hold elections and stifled the free press and the opposition.

The People's Revolutionary Army (PRA) was also formed during Bishop's administration. Critics claimed that the army was a waste of resources, and there were complaints that the PRA was used as a tool to commit human rights abuses, like detention of political dissidents.

Bishop has been quoted at length on the dynamics of democracy:

There are those ... who believe that you cannot have a democracy unless there is a situation where every five years ... people are allowed to put an "X" next to some candidate's name, and ... they return to being non-people without the right to say anything to their government, without any right to be involved in running their country. ...Elections could be important, but for us the question is one of timing. ...We would much rather see elections come when the economy is more stable, when the Revolution is more consolidated. When more people have in fact had benefits brought to them. When more people are literate ...The right of freedom of expression can really only be relevant if people are not too hungry, or too tired to be able to express themselves. It can only be relevant if appropriate grassroots mechanisms rooted in the people exist, through which the people can effectively participate. ...We talk about the human rights that the majority has never been able to enjoy, ... a job, to decent housing, to a good meal. ...These human rights have been the human rights for a small minority over the years in the Caribbean and the time has come for the majority of the people to begin to receive those human rights for the first time."

An anti-capitalist who advocated a non-capitalist path of development, Bishop believed in socialism one day replacing capitalism as the dominant mode of production, as he noted during an interview conducted in September 1983:

it took several hundred years for feudalism to be finally wiped out and capitalism to emerge as the new dominant mode of production and it will take several hundred years for capitalism to be finally wiped out before socialism becomes the new dominant mode. The struggle is the same with our neighbours. Most people who are unprepared to accept any form of change not only resent it but resist it in very open forms. I think you are going to find that there will be this difficulty amongst some of the leadership in neighbouring territories. We think that the key is to get across the message to them that we pose no threat to them and we are not interested in toppling their governments. We are not interested in imposing what we believe on them, that is the first thing. Secondly, we do really want to engage in as many areas of co-operation as we can. I think we have demonstrated that in a million different ways. Wherever we go we struggle not just for Grenada but for either the OECS territory sub-regional grouping or the wider CARICOM.

In his role as Prime Minister, Bishop travelled abroad to cultivate relations and to inform the world about the Grenada Revolution. In August 1983, after being invited to the US by the lobbying organisation TransAfrica and the Congressional Black Caucus, Bishop delivered a speech to an enthusiastic audience at Hunter College in Brooklyn, New York. It would be his last international speech. He defended Grenada's revolution, comparing it to the American Revolution and Emancipation Proclamation, and then spoke of "the continued economic subservience of the developing world, of the overthrow of Salvador Allende's government in Chile, and the brutal Contra interventions against the Sandinistas". When alluding to the adversarial stance of the Reagan administration toward Grenada, Bishop declared, "The real reason for all this hostility is because some perceive that what is happening in Grenada can lay the basis for a new socioeconomic and political path of development." According to Jacobin:

A state department report from the time summarised the Americans' concerns. The revolution in Grenada, it said, was in some ways even worse than the Cuban Revolution that had rocked the region a quarter of a century earlier: the vast majority of Grenadians were black, and therefore their struggle could resonate with thirty million black Americans; and the Grenadian revolutionary leaders spoke English, and so could communicate their message with ease to an American audience."

=== Arrest and execution ===
In September 1983, simmering tensions within PRG leadership reached a boiling point. A faction within the party, led by Deputy Prime Minister Bernard Coard, tried to make Bishop either step down or agree to a power-sharing arrangement. Bishop considered the matter for a couple of weeks, but ultimately rejected the proposal. In response, the Coard faction in conjunction with the PRA placed Bishop under house arrest on 13 October. Large public demonstrations gathered to demand Bishop's release and his return to power. The protesters numbered as high as 30,000 on an island of 100,000, and even some of Bishop's guards joined the protests. Despite the sizeable support, Bishop knew the determination of the Coard faction. He confided to a journalist: "I am a dead man."

On 19 October, a crowd of protesters managed to free Bishop from house arrest. He made his way, first by truck, then by car, to army headquarters at Fort Rupert (known today as Fort George), which he and his supporters were able to seize control of. At that point, Coard dispatched a military force from Fort Frederick to retake Fort Rupert. Bishop and seven others, including his cabinet ministers and aides, were captured. A four-man PRA firing squad executed Bishop and the others by machine-gunning them in the Fort Rupert courtyard. After Bishop was dead, a gunman slit his throat and cut off his finger to steal his ring. The bodies were transported to a military camp on the peninsula of Calivigny and partially burned in a pit. The location of their remains is still unknown.

Partly as a result of Bishop's murder, the Organization of Eastern Caribbean States (OECS) and the nations of Barbados and Jamaica appealed to the United States for assistance, as did Sir Paul Scoon, Governor-General of Grenada. Within days, President Ronald Reagan launched a US-led invasion to overthrow the PRG.

== Family ==
Maurice Bishop married nurse Angela Redhead in 1966. They had two children, John (born 1967) and Nadia (born 1969). Angela emigrated to Toronto, Canada, with both children in 1981, while Bishop was still prime minister. He also fathered a son, Vladimir Lenin Creft-Bishop (1978–1994), with his longtime partner Jacqueline Creft, who was Grenada's Minister of Education. Creft was killed alongside Bishop by the Fort Rupert firing squad on 19 October 1983. After his parents' deaths, Vladimir joined his half-siblings in Canada, but was stabbed to death in a Toronto nightclub at the age of 16.

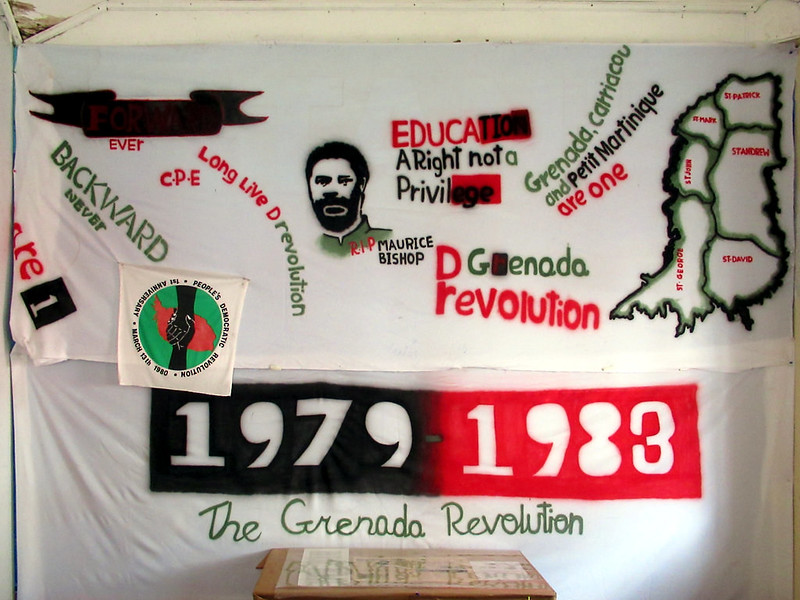
Banner of the Grenada Revolution, located in Grenada National Museum

== Legacy ==
On 29 May 2009, Grenada's international airport (formerly Point Salines International Airport) was renamed Maurice Bishop International Airport. Speaking at the ceremony, St. Vincent and the Grenadines Prime Minister Ralph Gonsalves said: "This belated honour to an outstanding Caribbean son will bring closure to a chapter of denial in Grenada's history."

== See also ==
- Grenada 17

Political offices
Preceded by Eric Gairy	Prime Minister of the People's Revolutionary Government of Grenada; 13 March 1979 – 16 October 1983	Succeeded by Bernard Coard
