= Grenada Cadet Corps =

- Cadet Corps emblem
- Active: 2009–present
- Country: Grenada
- Type: Cadet Corps
- Role: Military training
- Part of: Royal Grenada Police Force
- Mottos: Honour, Dignity, Respect

Commanders
- Governor-General: Dame Cécile La Grenade
- Minister of National Security: Dickon Mitchell
- Commandant: Nigel Noel

The Grenada Cadet Corps (GCC) is a voluntary youth organization open to students between the ages of 11 and 20 in Grenada. Though operating independently, it falls under the authority of the Royal Grenada Police Force and the Ministry of National Security. It is sponsored by the government of Grenada.

Its main objective is to provide training and personal development to youth through both military-style training and discipline and community activities. The training is geared towards inspiring young men and women to become model citizens. Emphasis during training is placed on discipline, loyalty, leadership and good citizenry. This is often acquired through a completed training course of being an active member in the Corps.

== History ==
The Grenada Cadet Corps has its roots in the British colonial period as a school youth organisation. The corps was inspected by Queen Elizabeth II during her 1966 visit to Grenada. The Cadet Corps disappeared in the mid-1980s, in the aftermath of the United States invasion of Grenada.

In 2004, the police force established a police cadet corps, which became the nucleus of the Grenada Cadet Corps when it was fully reintroduced in 2009. The corps was subsequently statutorised by Parliament with the enactment of the Grenada Cadet Corps Act in 2012.

== Structure ==
The Grenada Cadet Corps falls under the authority of the Ministry of National Security and is headed by a Commandant appointed by the Governor-General of Grenada.

The Grenada Cadet Corps Advisory Council, which consists of the Commissioner of Police, the Commandant and representatives of government ministries is tasked with advising the Commandant and Minister for National Security on the general governance of the Cadet Corps. It also advises the Governor-General on the issuing and withdrawal of officers commissions in the corps.

=== Ranks ===
==== Commissioned Officers ====
| Under Officer | Lowest rank of commission |
| Second Lieutenant | |
| Lieutenant | |
| Captain | |
| Major | |
| Lieutenant Colonel | |
| Colonel | Highest rank of commission |

==== Non-Commissioned Officers ====
| Recruit | New Students before basic training |
| Cadet Private | New Students after basic training |
| Lance Corporal | Students who are in the corps for at least a year in charge of 9 cadets |
| Corporal | Students who are in the corps for at least 2 years in charge of 2 lance corporals and 18 cadets |
| Sergeant (SGT) | Students who are in the corps for at least 3 years in charge of a platoon of 3 cpl 6 lcpl 27 cdt |
| Staff Sergeant (SSGT) | Students who are in the corps for at least 4 years typically assigned to office work or assignment concerning paper work |
| Company Sergeant major (CSM) | Students who are in the corps for at least 5 years in charge of a company or 60 cadets 3 sergeants 9 corporals and 18 lcpl |
| Regimental Sergeant major | Students who are in the corps for at least 7 years typically in charge of the most senior NCOS in the corps or force (CSM's, SSGT's, and SGT's) |
