= Fitzroy Bedeau =

Grenadian politician and police officer

Fitzroy F. A. Bedeau

Commissioner of Police
- In office 1998–2005
- Succeeded by: Winston James

Personal details
- Born: August 29, 1944 Gouyave, Saint John, Grenada
- Died: August 23, 2019 (aged 74) St. George's, Grenada
- Party: New National Party
- Occupation: Police officer, politician

Fitzroy F. A. Bedeau (29 August 1944 – 23 August 2019) was a politician and police officer from the island of Grenada, who served as commissioner of the Royal Grenada Police Force from 1998 until 2005. A native of the fishing town of Gouyave in Saint John Parish, he was also closely involved with the local fishing industry and was a supporter of sailing and boat racing.

== Police career ==
Bedeau first enlisted in the police force in April 1967 and retired as an Assistant Commissioner of Police in 1988. He returned to the Royal Grenada Police Force in 1995 as Deputy Commissioner, and was subsequently promoted to head the force.

In June 2004, the parliamentary opposition led by Tillman Thomas formally asked Bedeau to open a criminal investigation into Prime Minister Keith Mitchell over allegations that Mitchell had received a payment from indicted German financier Eric Resteiner. Bedeau told the press that the police were not bound to act on "hearsay" and that the final decision on whether to proceed would rest with the Director of Public Prosecutions.

In September 2004, Bedeau oversaw the force's response to Hurricane Ivan, a Category 5 storm that devastated Grenada, causing at least 12 deaths. The hurricane destroyed much of the country's infrastructure, including police stations and the force's headquarters at Fort George, and a number of officers – among them senior ranks – left their posts to shelter and protect their own families, contributing to widespread looting of businesses and private property. Following this breakdown of command, Prime Minister and Minister for National Security Keith Mitchell asked Bedeau to resign; he stepped down some months later, in 2005, and was succeeded as Commissioner by Winston James.

== Political career ==
In 2008, Bedeau stood for the Parliament of Grenada as a New National Party (NNP) candidate in the rural Saint John constituency, losing to Michael Church of the National Democratic Congress. According to several reports, Bedeau used to describe himself privately to colleagues as the unofficial "16th member" of the NNP-led Cabinet of Ministers under Mitchell, following the party's clean sweep of all 15 parliamentary seats in the 1999 general election.

In July 2008, Bedeau was charged with assault following an incident on 18 June 2008 in Gouyave involving a young woman, Kimlee Alexander, who had criticised his behaviour. The matter was reported to the Gouyave Police Station the following day, and Magistrate Tamara Gill issued summonses for both parties – along with seven other witnesses – to appear before the Gouyave Magistrate's Court on 15 July 2008.

== Death ==
Bedeau died on 23 August 2019, at the General Hospital in St. George's, following a period of illness. He was 75 years old. Prime Minister Keith Mitchell paid tribute to him, saying he had "dedicated a significant period of his professional life to policing and ensuring safety and security in this country", while Acting Commissioner of Police Edvin Martin described Bedeau as a stalwart who had continued to support the force after his retirement.
