= 2027 in Grenada =

- Decades: 2000s; 2010s; 2020s
- See also: Other events of 2027; Timeline of Jamaican history

Events in the year 2027 in Grenada.

== Events ==
- 23 July – 8 August – Grenada at the 2027 Pan American Games

== Holidays ==
- 1 January – New Year's Day
- 7 February – Independence Day
- 26 March – Good Friday
- 29 March – Easter Monday
- 1 May – Labour Day
- 17 May – Whit Monday
- 27 May – Corpus Christi
- 2 August – Emancipation Day
- 9–10 August – Carnival
- 19 October – National Heroes Day
- 25–26 October – Thanksgiving Day
- 25 December – Christmas Day
- 26 December – Boxing Day

== See also ==
- 2020s
- 2027 Atlantic hurricane season
- 2027 in the Caribbean
