= Special Services Unit (Grenada) =

- Emblem of the Special Services Unit Uniform patch
- Founded: 1 April 1985; 41 years ago
- Country: Grenada
- Allegiance: Charles III, King of Grenada
- Type: Paramilitary; Defence force
- Role: Light infantry
- Size: 80 men
- Part of: Royal Grenada Police Force
- Garrison/HQ: Camp Raymond
- Mottos: Dedicated to Serve and Protect with Dignity and Confidence

Commanders
- Governor-General: Dame Cécile La Grenade
- Minister of National Security: Dickon Mitchell
- Commissioner of Police: Randy Connaught
- Commander: Kenny Stanisclaus

The Special Services Unit (SSU) is the paramilitary unit of the Royal Grenada Police Force responsible for national defence. It was formed in 1985, following the United States invasion of Grenada as a replacement for the disbanded People's Revolutionary Army.

== History ==
Following the United States invasion of Grenada in 1983, the People's Revolutionary Army (PRA), Grenada's military during the 1979-1983 rule of the People's Revolutionary Government, was dissolved. With the dissolution of the military, defence became the responsibility of the police. The Special Services Unit was established as part of the police in April 1985 to replace the PRA, being provided with American training and weapons. Some ex-PRA soldiers were recruited to serve in the SSU due to lack of available manpower to form it.

In May 2024, concerns were raised on better utilising the SSU to combat crime in Grenada.

== Mission ==
The SSU has a number of roles - primarily it is responsible for maintaining the internal security of Grenada, which is linked to providing assistance to the regular police in maintaining law and order. It is also responsible for national emergency response. Other responsibilities consist of providing the Grenadian contingent to peacekeeping and support missions in the Eastern Caribbean via the Regional Security System.

The Special Services Unit also provides training for the Grenada Cadet Corps.

== Organisation ==
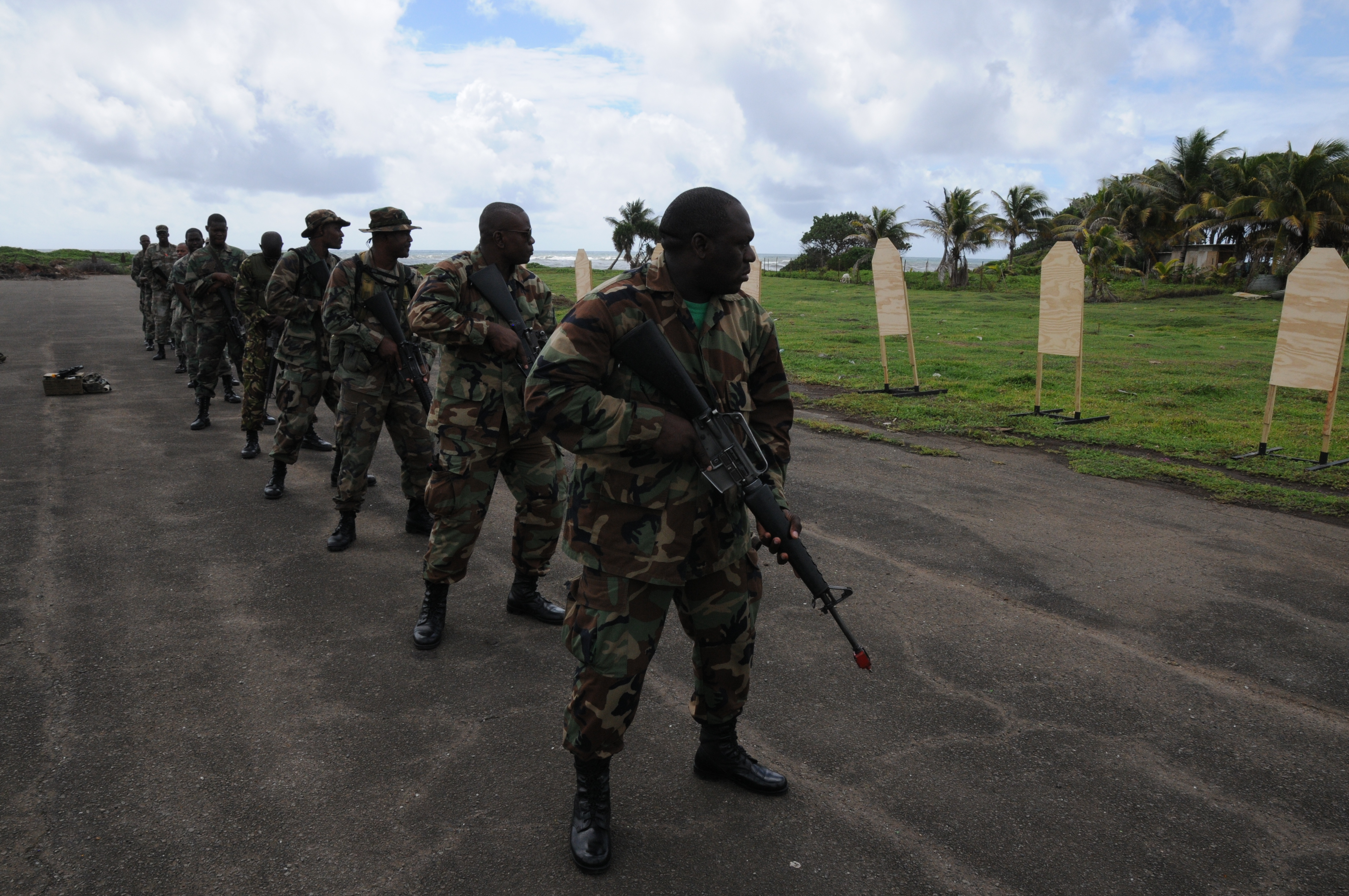
Special Services Unit officers with M16A1 rifles taking part exercise Tradewinds 2016.

The SSU is under the command of a Police Inspector, who answers to the Commissioner of Police of the Royal Grenada Police Force.

=== Equipment ===
The unit is primarily equipped with M-16 rifles and M4 carbines. SSU officers use U.S. Woodland for their uniforms.
