= 2026 in Grenada =

- Decades: 2000s; 2010s; 2020s
- See also: Other events of 2026; Timeline of Jamaican history

Events in the year 2026 in Grenada.

== Incumbents ==
- Monarch: Charles III
- Governor-General: Dame Cécile La Grenade
- Prime Minister: Dickon Mitchell

== Events ==
- 9–10 April – Acting Venezuelan president Delcy Rodríguez undertakes an official visit to Grenada.
- 5 November – 2026 Grenadian general election: The ruling National Democratic Congress wins 14 of 15 seats in the House of Representatives.

== Holidays ==
- 1 January – New Year's Day
- 7 February – Independence Day
- 3 April – Good Friday
- 6 April – Easter Monday
- 1 May – Labour Day
- 25 May – Whit Monday
- 4 June – Corpus Christi
- 3 August – Emancipation Day
- 10–11 August – Carnival
- 19 October – National Heroes Day
- 25–26 October – Thanksgiving Day
- 25 December – Christmas Day
- 26 December – Boxing Day

== See also ==
- 2020s
- 2026 Atlantic hurricane season
- 2026 in the Caribbean
