= Raymond Roberts =

Raymond Roberts may refer to:

- Jerry Roberts, British war-time codebreaker and businessman
- Raymond Roberts (Royal Navy chaplain), Welsh Anglican priest
- Raymond Roberts (politician), senator from Grenada
- Raymond Roberts, a pseudonym of the Canadian composer Ernest Seitz

== See also ==
- Ray Roberts (disambiguation)
