= Margaret Neckles =

Grenadian politician

The Honourable Margaret Allette Neckles

President of the Senate
- In office April 1990 – 1995
- Prime Minister: Nicholas Brathwaite
- Preceded by: John Watts
- Succeeded by: John Watts

Margaret Allette Neckles is a Grenadian politician. She was the first woman President of the Senate from 1990 to 1995. She has been a broadcaster and a civil servant for 20 years. She was nominated to the Senate in 1990 by Nicholas Brathwaite.
