= Jacqueline Creft =

Grenadian politician (1946–1983)

Minister of Women's Affairs of the People's Revolutionary Government
- In office 1982–1983

Minister of Education of the People's Revolutionary Government
- In office 1980–1983

Personal details
- Born: 1946
- Died: 19 October 1983 (aged 36–37) St. George's, Grenada
- Cause of death: Execution by firing squad
- Party: New JEWEL Movement
- Domestic partner: Maurice Bishop
- Children: Vladimir Creft
- Education: Carleton University
- Occupation: Politician

Jacqueline Creft (1946 – 19 October 1983) was a Grenadian politician, one of the leaders of the revolutionary New JEWEL Movement and Minister of Education in the People's Revolutionary Government from 1980 to 1983. She was executed in October 1983, along with Maurice Bishop, prime minister of the country and father of her son Vladimir (1977–1994).

== Biography ==
=== Early years of militancy of exile ===
Jacqueline Creft studied political science at Carleton University in Ottawa, Canada, and returned to Grenada at the end of 1971. She became involved in the revolutionary struggle early on, and was already participating in the New Jewel Movement from its beginning. In January 1973, she was among those who led an unprecedented protest against the British aristocrat Lord Brownlow, when he erected a gate on his estate of La Sagesse, denying the community its traditional privileges of access to the beach and use of the pastures. The protest was organized by members of JEWEL, including Maurice Bishop.

In 1976 and 1977, Creft resided in Trinidad and Tobago, where she was the regional coordinator for youth affairs within Christian Action for Development in the Eastern Caribbean (CADEC), a branch of the Caribbean Conference of Churches (CCC), until the government of Eric Williams (influenced by journalist Rickey Singh) banned her from the country. She returned to Grenada in 1977, but the government of Prime Minister Eric Gairy refused to give her work "as I was a new mother", Jacqueline complained.

On 4 December 1977, Creft's son Vladimir was born. She then travelled to Barbados with the organization Women and Development. She returned to Grenada to participate in the revolution of 13 March 1979.

=== The challenge of transforming the education system ===
In January 1980, Creft was appointed Minister of Education of the People's Revolutionary Government. She coordinated the Volunteer School Repair programmes and was in charge of Cuban scholarships. The revolution was especially committed to the construction of more schools and the eradication of illiteracy. Creft was dedicated to the transformation of the educational system inherited from colonialism, with the challenge of making it relevant to the population, and making education a right rather than a privilege.

The speeches of the People's Revolutionary Government, in the First International Conference of Solidarity with Grenada in November 1981, included "The construction of mass education in Free Grenada", by Minister of Education Jacqueline Creft.

Comrades, ever since our party was founded in March 1973, high upon our list of priorities has been the transformation of this twisted education system that we inherited from colonialism and from Gairy.

We were determined to change a system which so powerfully excluded the interests of the mass of our people, and which also wove webs of fear, alienation and irrelevance around our children's minds ... whether it was Little Miss Muffet, the Cow That Jumped Over the Moon, William the Conqueror, Wordsworth's Daffodils, or the so-called "Discoveries" By Christopher Columbus of the "New World".

The lucky few of us who went to secondary school, learned about Cromwell's Revolt but not about that of Fédon. We learned about the reforms of Wilberforce yet nothing of Marryshow. They made us read Shakespeare and Jane Austen, but kept silence about George Lamming.

Right from the beginning of our struggle we called for an education system which not only services all our people, secondary schools which would freely open the doors to all our people without the constraint of fees, but also a curriculum which would eliminate absurdity from our classrooms and focus our children's minds upon their own island, their own wealth, soil and crops, their own solution to the problems that surround them. For too long we had been brainwashed to think that only Europe and America held the answer.

In June 1982, Creft created, and was placed in charge of, the Ministry of Women's Affairs. The secretary of that ministry was Phyllis Coard, wife of Bernard Coard, who would later overthrow Bishop and execute him, along with Creft herself.

Creft left the party's leadership in November 1982, after having been active in it since its founding. In March 1983, Creft was demoted from candidate member to applicant member, though the reasons for this are not clear. According to writer David Franklyn, the situation was related to internal disputes in the movement between Bishop and Bernard Coard. The movement professed that the government would have co-leaders, but Bishop, though initially accepting and appointing Coard as vice president, changed his position and criticized Creft's support of Coard. The opposing faction, moreover, accused Bishop of sowing rumours that Coard planned to assassinate him.

=== Execution ===
In the tense days of early October 1983, Creft met in private with Maurice Bishop, being one of the few that visited him. When Bishop was placed under house arrest on 12 October 1983, at his home in Mount Wheldale, she went to visit him the next day. Security warned her that if she saw him, she would be arrested. According to reports, she accepted this.

At midday on 19 October 1983, a student from the Grenada Boys' Secondary School (GBSS), Thomas Cadore, led a group that surrounded the Mount Wheldale house where Bishop was confined and released him and Creft. Bishop was led to Fort Rupert by a crowd celebrating his release, and Creft decided to follow him. The army, under the command of General Hudson Austin, took action against Bishop's supporters. They arrested the leader and several members of his government and followers, including Creft, lined them up against a wall, and shot them.

In December 1986, 14 people (including Bernard and Phyllis Coard) were convicted of murder, and three of manslaughter – the so-called Grenada 17 – for their role in the killings. Death sentences were given for the murder charges, but these were subsequently commuted to life imprisonment. In 2008 and 2009, all of the remaining prisoners were released.

== Personal life ==
According to texts published after her death, Creft had maintained a romantic relationship with Maurice Bishop since his time as a student at Carleton University, despite the fact that he was married. It was an "open" and public relationship. They had a son, Vladimir, who was born on 4 December 1977, and died in 1994 after being stabbed at a nightclub in Toronto. In the Wilberforce cemetery, there is a bust of Maurice Bishop next to the tombstone of Vladimir Creft, whose year of death is erroneously given as 1995. Some media have indicated that Jacqueline Creft was pregnant with their second son, with that being the reason why Bishop had begged for her to be left alive. This information could not be confirmed, as Creft's body has not been found. In the 1986 trial of the Grenada 17, a witness testified that the bodies had been burned with gasoline. Jacqueline Creft was survived by her mother and father Lynn and Allan Creft and four siblings: Colleen Mahy, Michael Creft, Claudette Warner and Selwyn Creft.
