= Raymond Roberts (politician) =

Grenadian trade unionist and politician

- Education: Miami Dade College
- Organizations: Grenada Trades Union Council; Grenada Table Tennis Association

Raymond Roberts is a journalist, sports administrator, trade unionist and politician from Grenada.

== Biography ==
Roberts first trained as a journalist at the University of the West Indies and subsequently obtained an associate degree at Miami Dade College in communications. He became active in the Media Workers Association of Grenada and served as an executive member. He also served as General Secretary of the Grenada Trades Union Council (GTUC).

In March 2013, Roberts was nominated to a seat in the Senate representing the GTUC, one of three Senate seats held for specific constituencies (business and farmers being the others). In 2018, shortly before the general election, Roberts resigned from his Senate seat in order to contest the election representing the National Democratic Congress. In the Saint George South constituency, he came second with 2,679 votes to Nickolas Steele's 3,536 votes for the New National Party.

Roberts is active in the Grenada Table Tennis Association (GTTA) and presently serves as secretary of the organisation.
