= 2020 in Grenada =

- Decades: 2000s; 2010s; 2020s
- See also: Other events of 2020; Timeline of Jamaican history

Events in the year 2020 in Grenada.

== Incumbents ==
- Monarch: Elizabeth II
- Governor-General: Dame Cécile La Grenade
- Prime Minister: Keith Mitchell

== Events ==
Ongoing — COVID-19 pandemic in Grenada

- January 1 – 2021 New Year Honours
- March 22 – Grenada reports its first confirmed case of COVID-19.
- March 29 – The Government announces 24-hour curfew lasting one week.
- April 6 – The Government extends the curfew/lockdown for a further two weeks.
- April 18 – The Government extends the lockdown for another week.
- 10 May – The Government eases COVID-19 restrictions.

== Sports ==
- 2019–20 GFA Premier League
