= 2022 in Grenada =

- Decades: 2000s; 2010s; 2020s
- See also: Other events of 2022; Timeline of Jamaican history

Events in the year 2022 in Grenada.

== Incumbents ==
- Monarch: Elizabeth II (until September 8); then Charles III
- Governor-General: Dame Cécile La Grenade
- Prime Minister: Keith Mitchell (until 24 June); Dickon Mitchell onwards

== Events ==
Ongoing — COVID-19 pandemic in Grenada

- January 1 – 2022 New Year Honours
- June 23 – 2022 Grenadian general election: Citizens of Grenada vote in a general election.
- June 24 – The oppositional National Democratic Congress wins the majority of seats in Grenada's latest general election. NDC's party leader Dickon Mitchell becomes Grenada's next Prime Minister.
- September 8 – Accession of Charles III as King of Grenada following the death of Queen Elizabeth II.
- September 12 – Charles III is officially proclaimed King of Grenada by the Governor-General at Government House in St. George's.
- September 19 – The Governor-General attends the Queen's state funeral in the United Kingdom.
- September 25 – A special commemorative service takes place at the St. George's Anglican Church to mark the passing of Elizabeth II, Queen of Grenada.

== Deaths ==
- January 1 – Mighty Bomber, 93, calypsonian
- September 8 – Elizabeth II, 96, Queen of Grenada
- September 24 – Hudson Austin, 84, military officer, chairman of the Revolutionary Military Council (1983)
