= 2021 in Grenada =

- Decades: 2000s; 2010s; 2020s
- See also: Other events of 2021; Timeline of Jamaican history

Events in the year 2021 in Grenada.

== Incumbents ==
- Monarch: Elizabeth II
- Governor-General: Dame Cécile La Grenade
- Prime Minister: Keith Mitchell

== Events ==
Ongoing — COVID-19 pandemic in Grenada

- January 1 – 2021 New Year Honours
- November 19 – Argentina officially announces that it will donate 11,000 doses of the Oxford–AstraZeneca COVID-19 vaccine to Grenada.

== Sports ==
- Grenada at the 2020 Summer Olympics
- Grenada at the 2020 Summer Paralympics
