= 2023 in Grenada =

- Decades: 2000s; 2010s; 2020s
- See also: Other events of 2023; Timeline of Jamaican history

Events in the year 2023 in Grenada.

== Incumbents ==
- Monarch: Charles III
- Governor-General: Dame Cécile La Grenade
- Prime Minister: Dickon Mitchell

== Events ==
Ongoing — COVID-19 pandemic in Grenada

- January 1 – 2023 New Year Honours
- April 28 – A fire at a power station in Grenada causes a power outage for the entire island of Carriacou.
- May 6 – Coronation of Charles III as King of Grenada and the other Commonwealth realms. Governor-General Dame Cécile La Grenade and Prime Minister Dickon Mitchell attend the ceremony in London.
- August 28 - Heatwave in Grenada causes an islandwide power outage for Grenada.
