= New Parliament Building =

New Parliament Building can mean:

- Parliament House (Malta)
- New Parliament Building, Grenada
- New Zimbabwe Parliament Building
