= Guardian-class =

Guardian class may refer to:

- Guardian-class patrol boat, vessels designed and built in Australia, intended to enable smaller Pacific Ocean nations to patrol their own exclusive economic zones
- Guardian-class patrol boat (Grenada), see Grenadan patrol boat Tyrrel Bay
- Guardian-class radar picket ship, former World War II Liberty ships, retrofitted to serve as United States Navy support vessels
