= Chester Humphrey =

Chester Arlington Arthur Humphrey

President of the Senate
- In office 24 December 2014 – 31 August 2022
- Prime Minister: Keith Mitchell
- Preceded by: Lawrence Albert Joseph
- Succeeded by: Dessima Williams

Personal details
- Born: 1952 (age 73–74)

Chester Humphrey is a Grenadian trade unionist and politician, and former President of the Senate.

Humphrey was born in 1952. He has been a trade unionist for over three decades, and president general at the Grenada Technical and Allied Workers Union (GTAWU) for 26 years. He was an executive member Maurice Bishop's People's Revolutionary Government in early 1980s.

Humphrey was Deputy President of the Senate from 2008 to 2013. He was elected President of the Senate from 24 December 2014 to 31 August 2022. Humphrey was general secretary of Caribbean Congress of Labour from 2010 to 2016.

Humphrey was a member of National Democratic Congress (NDC) until 2012, when he was expelled from the party. He has since been associated with New National Party (NNP).
