= Grenada–Mexico relations =

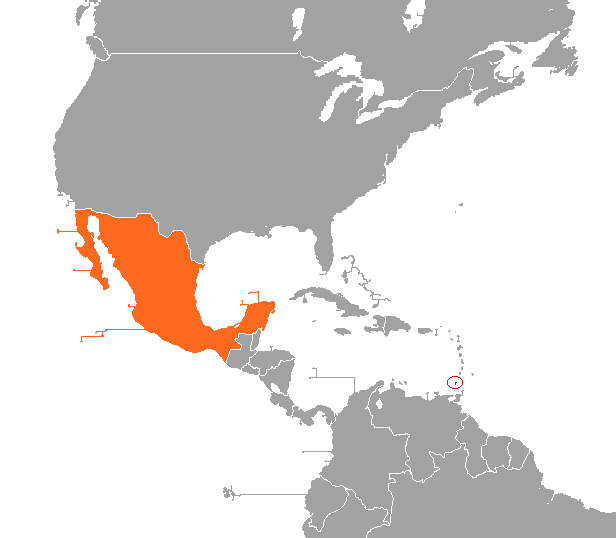

- Grenada: Mexico

The nations of Grenada and Mexico established diplomatic relations in 1975. Both nations are members of the Association of Caribbean States, Community of Latin American and Caribbean States, Organization of American States and the United Nations.

== History ==
Grenada and Mexico established diplomatic relations on 11 April 1975. Since the establishment of diplomatic relations; relations between both nations have taken place in primarily multilateral forums. In 1983, Mexico condemned the United States invasion of Grenada and demanded respect to the territorial integrity and sovereignty of Grenada. Mexico also urged international organizations to take the necessary measures for withdrawal of all foreign forces from Grenada.

In February 2010, Grenadian Prime Minister Tillman Thomas paid a visit to Cancún to attend the Mexico-Caribbean Community (CARICOM) summit. In November 2010, Grenadian Prime Minister Thomas returned to Cancún to attend the 2010 United Nations Climate Change Conference.

In 2014, Mexico opened an honorary consulate in St. George's. That same year, Grenadian Prime Minister Keith Mitchell and Foreign Minister Nickolas Steele traveled to Mexico to attend the Mexico-Caribbean Community summit in Mérida.

In 2004 Hurricane Ivan hit Grenada and destroyed the nation's Parliament building. Mexico financially contributed $13.5 million Eastern Caribbean dollars to the building of Grenada's new Parliament building. The new building was inaugurated in June 2014 and was attended by non-resident Mexican Ambassador Oscar Esparza-Vargas. In honor of Mexico's contribution, Grenada named the House of Parliament's library as Mexico Library, to commemorate the close ties between the two countries.

In March 2018, Mexican Foreign Minister Luis Videgaray Caso paid a visit to Grenada. In 2021, Mexico sent doctors to Grenada to assist with the fight against COVID-19 on the island-nation.

== High-level visits ==
High-level visits from Grenada to Mexico

- Prime Minister Tillman Thomas (February & November 2010)
- Prime Minister Keith Mitchell (2014)
- Foreign Minister Nickolas Steele (2014)
- Foreign Minister Peter David (2021)

High-level visits from Mexico to Grenada

- Foreign Minister Luis Videgaray Caso (2018)

== Bilateral agreements ==
Both nations have signed a few bilateral agreements such as an Agreement in Educational and Cultural Cooperation (1981) and an Agreement for Cooperation in Development (2014). Each year, the Mexican government offers scholarships for nationals of Grenada to study postgraduate studies at Mexican higher education institutions.

== Trade ==
In 2023, trade between Grenada and Mexico totaled US$6.1 million. Grenada's main exports to Mexico include: electrical apparatus for circuits, telephones including mobile phones and valves for pipes and vats. Mexico's main exports to Grenada include: furniture, household electronics, iron and non-alloy steel, chemical based products, alcohol and oil. Mexican multinational company Cemex operates in Grenada.

== Resident diplomatic missions ==
- Grenada is accredited to Mexico from its embassy in Washington, D.C., United States.
- Mexico is accredited to Grenada from its embassy in Castries, Saint Lucia and maintains an honorary consulate in St. George's.
