= Grenadian patrol boat Tyrrel Bay =

Former flagship of the Royal Grenada Coast Guard

History

Grenada
- Name: Tyrrel Bay
- Builder: Lantana Boatyard, Lantana, Florida
- Commissioned: November 1984
- Decommissioned: 2012
- Fate: Scuttled as diving site

General characteristics
- Class & type: Guardian-class patrol boat
- Displacement: 94 long tons (96 t) full
- Length: 32.31 m (106 ft 0 in)
- Beam: 6.25 m (20 ft 6 in)
- Draft: 2.13 m (7 ft 0 in)
- Propulsion: 3 × GM Detroit Diesel 12V71 TI diesel engines, 2,250 shp (1,678 kW), 3 props, 21 tons fuel
- Speed: 24 knots (44 km/h; 28 mph)
- Complement: 4 officers, 12 enlisted
- Sensors & processing systems: 1 × Furuno 1411 Mk II navigation radar
- Armament: 2 × single 12.7 mm machine guns; 2 × single 7.62 mm machine guns

Tyrrel Bay (PB-01) was a United States-built Guardian-class patrol boat which served as the flagship of the Royal Grenada Coast Guard. She was built for Grenada at the US's request and entered service in November 1984. The builder was Lantana Boatyard and the ship was put together at Lantana, Florida. The Tyrrel Bay had an aluminum hull construction, and was overhauled in 1995. She was scuttled and sunk as a dive site off the coast of Grenada in 2018

== Description ==
Tyrrell Bay's hull was built from aluminium and measured 32.31 m (106 ft 0 in) in length, 6.25 m (20 ft 6 in) across her beam and had a draft of 2.13 m (7 ft 0 in); her full load displacement was 94 long tons (96 t). She was equipped with three General Motors Detroit Diesel 12V71 TI 2,250 shp (1,678 kW) diesel engines and driven by three 3 propellers. Tyrrel Bay could carry 21 long tons (21 t) of fuel and was capable of making 24 knots (44 km/h; 28 mph). She was equipped with a Furuno 1411 Mk II navigation radar and a Magnavox MX4102 satellite navigation system. Tyrrel Bay carried a crew of four officers and twelve enlisted personnel.

== Service and fate ==
The Tyrrel Bay was donated to the Grenadian government by the US government in 1984. It was operated by the Royal Grenada Coast Guard branch of the Royal Grenada Police Force. She was built by Lantana Boatyard, Lantana, Florida from January 1984 and entered service on 21 November 1984. Tyrrel Bay served under the pennant number PB-01. It was hoped by the Grenadian government and US embassy staff that the presence of the vessel would help to calm tensions ahead of the December 1984 Grenadian general election, the first following the 1983 United States invasion of Grenada. Tyrrel Bay was overhauled at Saint Croix in the United States Virgin Islands in late 1995.

By 2016 the Tyrrel Bay had been out of service for some years. The Grenada Scuba Diving Association campaigned for the vessel to be decommissioned and sunk for recreational wreck diving. Agreement was reached from the US and Grenadian governments and, on 25 September 2018 Tyrrel Bay was sunk around 1 mile (1.6 km) off Grande Anse beach in Saint George Parish, Grenada. The works were funded by the Grenada Tourism Authority, the Grenada Hotel and Tourism Association and the Clarkes Court Boatyard. The wreck lies 16 metres (52 ft) deep near to Boss Reef, its upper portions lie within 15 feet (4.6 m) of the surface.
