= Commissioner of Police (Grenada) =

Head of the Royal Grenada Police Force

- Incumbent; Randy Connaught; Acting since 16 December 2024
- Royal Grenada Police Force
- Reports to: Minister of National Security
- Appointer: Governor General on the advice of the Public Service Commission
- Term length: At His Majesty's pleasure
- Inaugural holder: A. E. Cappel
- Formation: 1912
- Deputy: Jessmon Prince
- Website: https://www.rgpf.gd/index.php/about-us/executive-team

The Commissioner of Police is the professional head of the Royal Grenada Police Force. The position is currently held by Randy Connaught, who has acted in the role since December 2024. The Commissioner is appointed by the Governor-General of Grenada, and reports to the Minister of National Security.

Alongside being head of the regular police force, the Commissioner also has ultimate authority over the Royal Grenada Coast Guard and the Special Services Unit, Grenada's paramilitary defence force.

The rank insignia consist of two crossed batons within a laurel circle below a single police star surmounted by a crown.

== History ==
The Grenada Police Force was originally established in 1853 as a part-time policing service. The position of Commissioner (then titled Chief of Police) was established in 1912. The first occupant of the office was A. E. Cappel.

During the 1979-1983 Grenada Revolution the police force and the position of Commissioner were marginalised and reduced in importance in favour of the People's Revolutionary Army. Following the collapse of the revolution and the United States invasion of Grenada in 1983 however, the office of Commissioner increased in importance, as the police were granted authority over national defence with the dissolution of the army.

Historically the office of the Commissioner of Police has been situated at Fort George. In 2025 however the Commissioner's office alongside the entire Police High Command were moved out from the fort with the opening of the New Police Headquarters.
