= Kenny Lalsingh =

President of the Senate
- In office 3 March 2006 – 3 June 2008
- Prime Minister: Keith Mitchell
- Preceded by: Leslie-Ann Seon
- Succeeded by: Joan Purcell

Personal details
- Born: 2 February 1951 (age 75)
- Party: NNP --> DLC --> NDC --> PLM --> NNP

Kenny Lalsingh is a Grenadian businessman and politician, and former President of the Senate and cabinet minister. He was an elected MP of both of Grenadian main parties, the New National Party (NNP) and the National Democratic Congress (NDC).

Lalsingh was 71 years old in 2022, so he was born in 1951.

Lalsingh was elected to the House of Representatives for NNP in the 1984 elections for the rural Saint Patrick West constituency. He was a member of NNP until 1986. He was removed as the junior minister in Keith Mitchell's Ministry of Works and Public Utilities amidst a scandal over the sale of cement. After a fallout, he formed a new party Democratic Labour Congress (DLC).

Lalsingh helped to establish the National Democratic Congress in 1987 with George Brizan, Francis Alexis and Tillman Thomas who resigned from the NNP due to differences with Herbert Blaize and his economic policies. He was a successfully elected candidate of NDC in the 1990 and 1995 elections. In the cabinet of Nicholas Brathwaite, he was Minister of Health in 1990, and then minister of communications and works until he was forced to resign in February 1991. Lalsingh was a failed candidate of NDC in the 1999 elections. He was a failed candidate of People's Labour Movement in the 2003 elections.

Lalsingh was the President of the Senate from March 2006 to June 2008 during the administration of Keith Mitchell. He was back with Keith Mitchell's NNP for the 2013 elections when NNP won all seats. He was appointed of Minister for Implementation and Leader of Government Business in the Senate of Grenada. However, he was removed from these positions after some months.
