= Leslie-Ann Seon =

Grenadian lawyer and politician

President of the Senate
- In office 9 January 2004 – 27 February 2006
- Prime Minister: Keith Mitchell
- Preceded by: John Watts
- Succeeded by: Kenny Lalsingh

Personal details
- Born: ca. 1962-1964

Leslie-Ann Seon is a Grenadian lawyer and politician.

Seon was 54 years old in 2017, so she was born about 1962-1964. Seon has a law degree from University of the West Indies and legal education certificate from Hugh Wooding Law School. She has been admitted to bars in Grenada, Barbados and British Virgin Islands.

She was appointed the President of the Senate from 2004 to 2006 during the administration of Keith Mitchell. She is the founder and principal attorney at Grenada law firm Seon & Associates and an executive at Grenada-based Republic Bank.

She is a former deputy chairman of Grenada Airports Authority.
