= Joan Purcell =

DBE Joan Millicent Purcell

President of the Senate
- In office 20 August 2008 – 9 January 2013
- Prime Minister: Tillman Thomas
- Preceded by: Kenny Lalsingh
- Succeeded by: Lawrence Albert Joseph

Personal details
- Born: 23 September 1942 (age 83) Carriacou
- Party: National Democratic Congress

Dame Joan Millicent Purcell (DBE) is a Grenadian politician, community activist and educator.

Purcell was born on 23 September 1942 on Carriacou. She has a bachelor's degree in social studies from University of the West Indies and University of Toronto.

In 1983 after United States invasion to Grenada, Purcell was invited to the interim government by Sir Paul Scoon. She was a member of the cabinet from 1983 to 1984.

Purcell was elected to the House of Representatives of Grenada in the 1990 elections from the St George constituency. She was re-elected to the house in the 1995 elections from Carriacou constituency. She was appointed minister of communications, works, public utilities, information and women's affairs from 1993 to 1995. She was also acting Prime Minister. In 1996 she was elected as deputy political leader of the National Democratic Congress (NDC), and acting political leader of the party from 1998 to 1999. In 1999 she led NDC into the 1999 elections, and after the elections became the political leader of NDC.

Purcell was appointed President of the Senate from 2008 to 2013. She has since retired from frontline politics. In June 2024, she was made Dame Commander by King Charles III in the 2024 Birthday Honours.
