= John Watts (Grenadian politician) =

Grenadian politician (died 2015)

The Right Honourable John Watts

President of the Senate
- In office 1988–1990
- Prime Minister: Herbert Blaize; Ben Jones
- Preceded by: Lawrence Albert Joseph
- Succeeded by: Margaret Neckles

President of the Senate
- In office 1995–2004
- Prime Minister: Keith Mitchell
- Preceded by: Margaret Neckles
- Succeeded by: Leslie-Ann Seon

Personal details
- Born: John Augustus Fitzroy Watts; 1921 or 1922 St. Patrick, Grenada
- Died: 11 May 2015 (aged 93) St George's, Grenada
- Party: Grenada National Party; New National Party; National Party

Sir John Augustus Fitzroy Watts KCMG CBE (1921 or 1922 – 11 May 2015) was a Grenadian dentist, politician and co-founder of the Grenada National Party.

== Early years ==
Watts was born in the parish of Saint Patrick's on the Caribbean island of Grenada. He went to Michigan State University and studied to become a dentist at New York University, he was registered as a dentist of St. George's on 21 November 1955. He and his friend, the barrister and civil servant from Carriacou, Herbert Blaize, started the Grenada National Party (GNP). He chaired the Grenada Tourist Board for 10 years and was president of the Caribbean Tourism Association (CTA) for two years. He was awarded the Order of the British Empire (CBE) on 31 December 1987.

== Grenada National Party ==
In 1953, John Watts formed and led the Grenada National Party as a rival party to Eric Gairy's Grenada United Labour Party started two years earlier — a party that would become its main rival for the next 25 years. In an early GNP manifesto Watts declared that the party was "democratic socialist", but disavowed trade union connections and shaped the party to have a multi-class appeal — a philosophy inherited by Blaize when he became leader two years later. The first General election with several political parties was held in 1957 (although it was the third held on the basis of universal adult suffrage). 1960 saw the GNP in a coalition with another political party and the following year it lost the election. However Gairy was soon banned from political activities, losing his seat (1957–61), and the Constitution was suspended by Britain (following an enquiry into Gairy's government). The GNP then won the 1962 elections, on an unfulfilled promise of a "unitary state" with Trinidad and Tobago, and Blaize remained chief minister until the party lost the elections to Gairy in August 1967.

== Rotary ==
In 1974, Sir John became the first Rotary District Governor for District 404 which includes all the French, Dutch, and English speaking islands in the Caribbean. He was later appointed member of the 1976 Convention Committee of Rotary International and helped the charter of the Rotaract Club of Grenada (on 21 January 1978).

== President of the Senate ==
Whilst he was vice chairman of the New National Party (NNP) and head of the Grenada tourist board, Dr. Watts was first appointed a senator on 27 April 1998 (at that time replacing Alphonsus Antoine). He was President of the Senate from 1988 to 1990 and secondly from 1995 to 2004. In June 2004, he was appointed a consultant to parliament as a senior figure in the then-ruling party.

== Recognition ==
On 31 December 1999, he was awarded the Order of St Michael and St George (KCMG).

He was praised in December 2012 by the Grenada Hotel and Tourism Association, as part of its 50th anniversary celebrations sponsored by Spice Island Beach Resort to honour him as the main stimulus behind the formation of the association in 1961.

Dr Keith Mitchell mentioned his own successful bid for leadership of the party in 1989, noting that Sir John, unlike many of his peers, was the one person who stated, “let democracy prevail” when he wrested leadership from Mr Blaize, which led to formation of the New National Party.

A year later, at the Independence Day Awards, he was among four people rewarded for their contribution to the growth of the nation.

== Death ==
He died on 11 May 2015 near St. George's, Grenada.
