= Ray Roberts =

Ray Roberts may refer to:

- Ray Roberts (politician) (1913–1992), congressman from Texas
- Ray Roberts (American football) (born 1969), American football player
- Ray Roberts (baseball) (1895–1962), baseball pitcher

== See also ==
- Raymond Roberts (disambiguation)
