= Lawrence Albert Joseph =

Sir Lawrence Joseph KCNG, CBE

President of the Senate of Grenada
- In office 27 March 2013 – 24 December 2014
- Prime Minister: Keith Mitchell
- Preceded by: Joan Purcell
- Succeeded by: Chester Humphrey
- In office 1984–1988
- Prime Minister: Herbert Blaize
- Succeeded by: John Watts

Speaker of the House of Representatives of Grenada
- In office 9 January 2004 – 3 June 2008
- Prime Minister: Keith Mitchell
- Preceded by: George McGuire
- Succeeded by: George McGuire

Personal details
- Born: Lawrence Albert Joseph; 1944 (age 81–82) Saint Andrew Parish, Grenada
- Party: New National Party
- Education: University of London; University of the West Indies

Sir Lawrence Joseph is an attorney and a politician from Grenada.

He was born in Saint Andrew's in 1944. He has a degree from University of London, master of laws from University of London, barrister at law from Lincoln’s Inn, bachelor of sciences in economics from University of the West Indies. He first worked as an economist until start practising law in 1977.

He was also former party chairman on New National Party in 1984. He served as President of the Senate from 1984 to 1988.

Joseph also served as the leader of government business, and before 2003 as minister of education and minister of labour. He was also appointed Speaker of the House of Representatives in 2003, and served from January 2004 to June 2008.

Joseph served again as President of the Senate from March 2013 to December 2014. He was appointed acting Attorney General of Grenada in 2017.
