= Politics of Grenada =

The politics of Grenada takes place in a framework of a parliamentary representative democracy, whereby the prime minister is the head of government. Grenada is an independent Commonwealth realm. It is governed under a multi-party parliamentary system whose political and legal traditions closely follow those of the United Kingdom; it has a prime minister and a cabinet, and a bicameral Parliament with an elected House of Representatives and an appointed Senate. Executive power is exercised by the government. Legislative power is vested in both the government and parliament. Constitutional safeguards include freedom of speech, press, worship, motion, and association. Grenada is a member of the eastern Caribbean court system. The Judiciary is independent of the executive and the legislature. Jurisprudence is based on English common law.

Citizens enjoy a wide range of civil and political rights guaranteed by the constitution. Grenada's constitution provides citizens with the right to change their government peacefully. Citizens exercise this right through periodic, free, and fair elections held on the basis of universal suffrage.

Grenada has two significant political parties, both moderate: the National Democratic Congress (liberal) and the New National Party (conservative). Minor parties include the up-and-coming Progress Party, which is led by Kerry Velon Simmons – one of the youngest active political leaders, the left-of-center Maurice Bishop Patriotic Movement (MBPM, organized by the pro-Bishop survivors of the October 1983 anti-Bishop coup) and the populist GULP of former Prime Minister Eric Gairy.

At the July 2008, election the NDC won a comfortable seven-seat majority over the government of former Prime Minister Keith Mitchell. New Prime Minister Tillman Thomas formed a government after narrowly losing by one seat to Mitchell's NNP in the November 2003 election. In elections held on February 19, 2013, Keith Mitchell's NNP swept all fifteen parliamentary seats. This historic victory was a repeat of the 1999 elections in which the NNP also swept all 15 seats. Prime Minister Mitchell has the distinction as being the only Caribbean politician to sweep all seats on two occasions. Constitutionally, this development means that there is no official opposition in Parliament. As such, Governor General Carlye Glean, who is the titular head of state, will appoint 5 Senators to the Upper House, who will serve as the de facto opposition.

Security in Grenada is maintained by the 650 members of the Royal Grenada Police Force (RGPF), which includes an 80-member paramilitary Special Services Unit (SSU) and the 30-member Royal Grenada Coast Guard. The U.S. Army and the U.S. Coast Guard provide periodic training and material support for the SSU and the coast guard.

== Executive branch ==
As head of state, King Charles III is represented in Grenada by a governor general who acts on the advice of the prime minister and the cabinet. The leader of the majority party serves as Prime Minister and head of government. The cabinet consists of members, including the prime minister and ministers of executive departments. They answer politically to the House of Assembly. The Governor General appoints the Chief Justice of the Supreme Court on the advice of the Prime Minister and the Leader of the Opposition. The Governor General appoints the other justices with the advice of a judicial commission. The Privy Council of the United Kingdom serves as the highest appellate court.

Main office-holders

The King of Grenada:
Charles III
since
8 September 2022

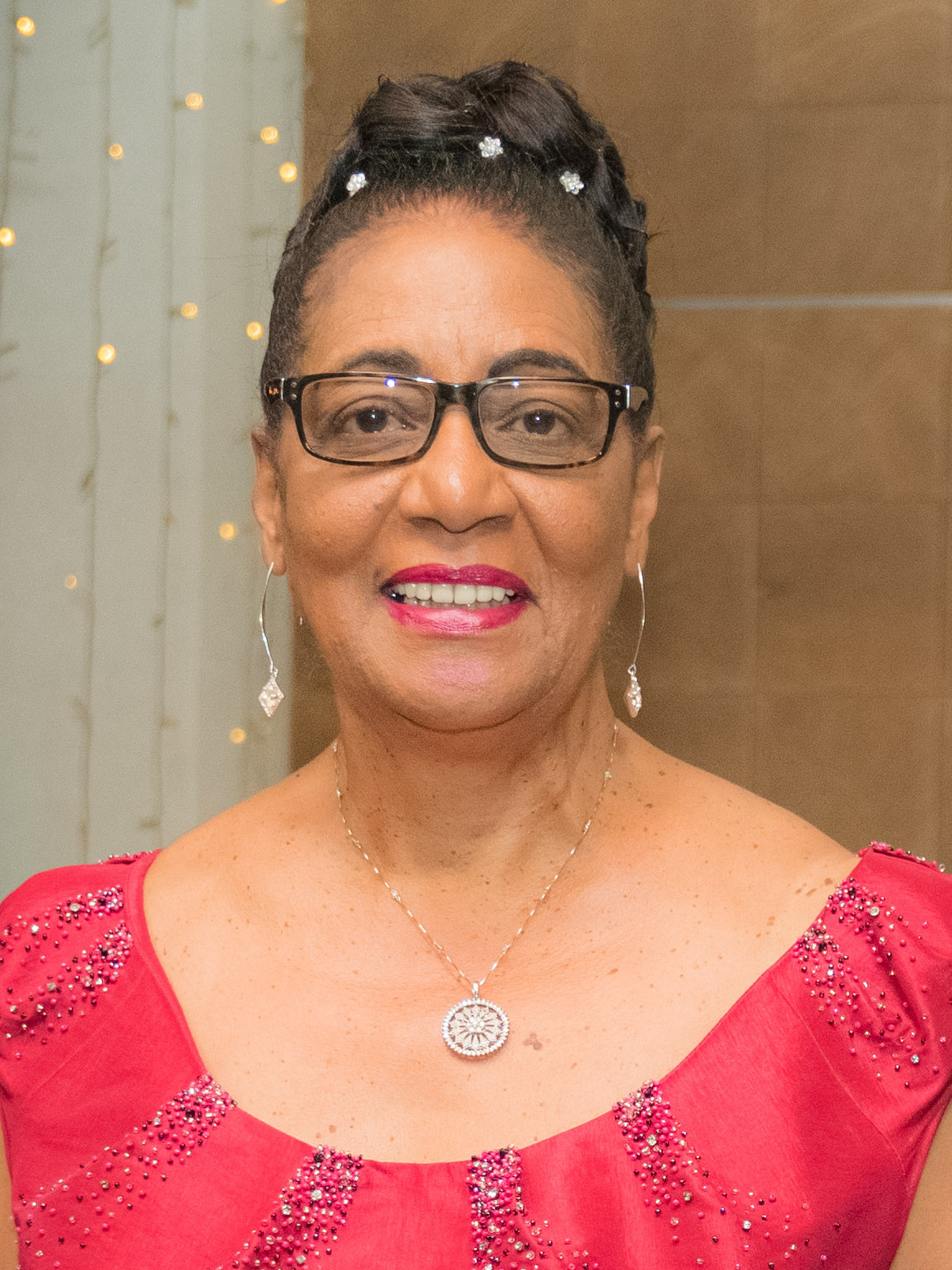
The Governor-General of Grenada:
Dame Cécile La Grenade
since
7 May 2013

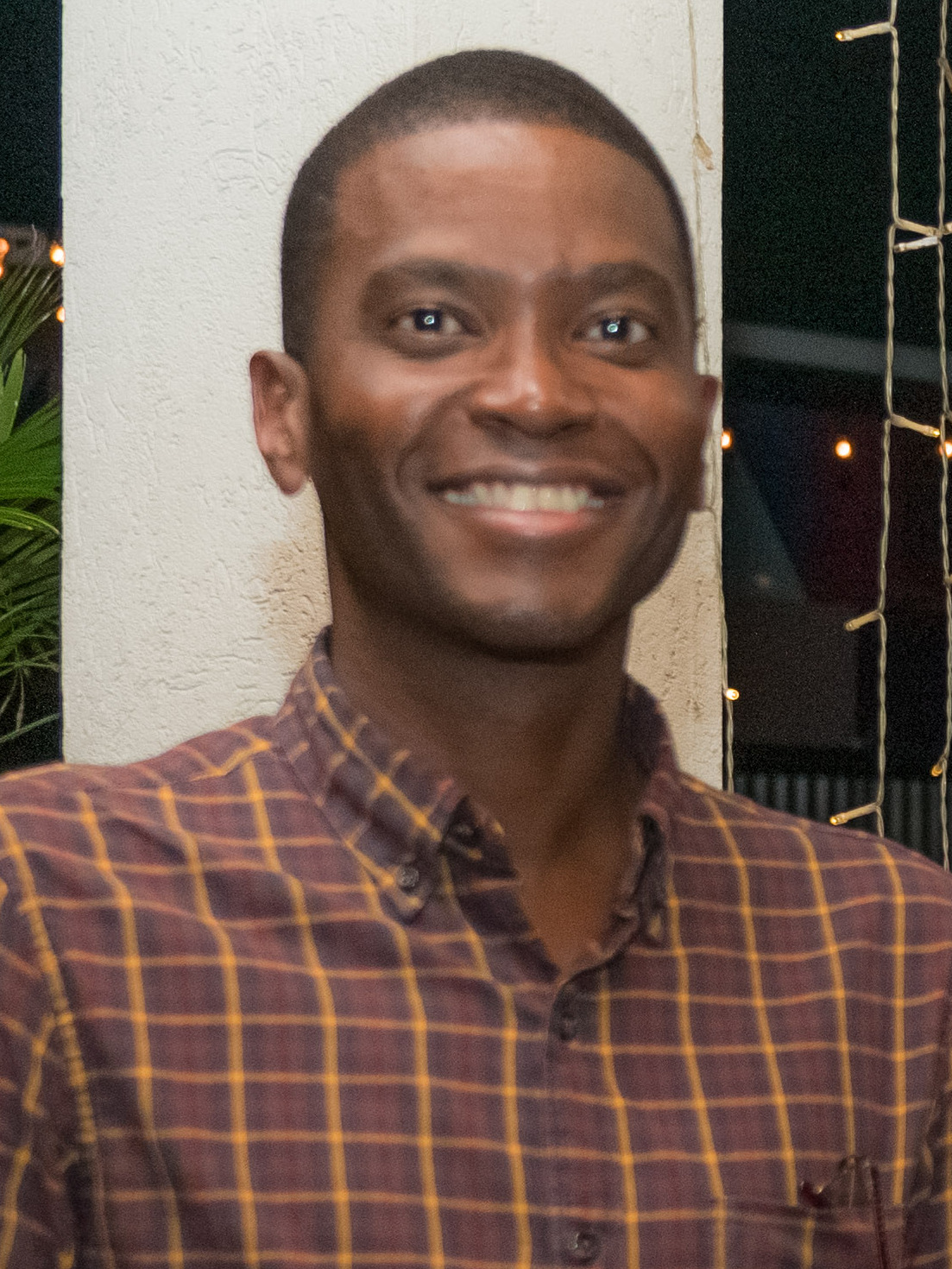
The Prime Minister of Grenada:
Dickon Mitchell
since
24 June 2022

== Legislative branch ==
The Parliament has two chambers. The House of Representatives has 15 members, elected for a five-year term in single-seat constituencies. The Senate has 13 appointed members, 10 appointed by the government and three by the parliamentary opposition).

== Political parties and elections ==
Party	Votes	%	Seats	+/–
National Democratic Congress	31,430	51.84	9	+9
New National Party	28,959	47.76	6	–9
Grenada United Labour Party	64	0.11	0	New
Independent Freedom Party	60	0.10	0	New
Grenada Renaissance Party	31	0.05	0	0
Independents	86	0.14	0	0
Total	60,630	100.00	15	0
Valid votes	60,630	99.49		
Invalid/blank votes	311	0.51		
Total votes	60,941	100.00		
Registered voters/turnout	86,658	70.32		
Source: Grenada Elections 2022

== Judicial branch ==
The Judicial Committee of the Privy Council was the highest court until 1979, when People's Law No. 84 was passed terminating appeals from the Grenadian courts. Appeals to the J.C.P.C. was restored in 1991.

West Indies Associated States Supreme Court or Eastern Caribbean States Supreme Court is the judiciary of Grenada from 1967 to 1979 and since 1991. An associate judge resides in Grenada.

From 1979 to 1991 the court system comprises the High Court and the Court of Appeals, which replaced the Eastern Caribbean States Supreme Court established under the West Indies Act of 1967. Grenada was readmitted into the Eastern Caribbean States Supreme Court in 1991.

== Administrative divisions ==
6 parishes and 1 dependency*; Carriacou and Petit Martinique*, Saint Andrew, Saint David, Saint George, Saint John, Saint Mark, Saint Patrick

== International organization participation ==
ACP, C, Caricom, CDB, ECLAC, FAO, G-77, IBRD, ICAO, ICFTU, ICRM, IDA, IFAD, IFC, IFRCS, ILO, IMF, IMO, Interpol, IOC, ISO (subscriber), ITU, LAES, NAM, OAS, OECS, OPANAL, OPCW, UN, UNCTAD, UNESCO, UNIDO, UPU, WCL, WHO, WIPO, WToO, WTrO, frat
