= Grenadian patrol boat Levera =

History

Grenada
- Name: Levera
- Builder: SeaArk, Monticello, Arkansas
- Commissioned: September 1995
- Status: in active service

General characteristics
- Class & type: Dauntless-class patrol boat
- Displacement: 11 long tons (11 t) full
- Length: 12.19 m (40 ft 0 in)
- Beam: 3.86 m (12 ft 8 in)
- Draft: 0.69 m (2 ft 3 in)
- Propulsion: 2 × Caterpillar 3208TA diesel engines, 850 bhp (634 kW), 2 props, 250 gallons fuel
- Speed: 28 knots (52 km/h; 32 mph)
- Range: 200 nmi (370 km) at 30 kn (56 km/h; 35 mph); 400 nmi (740 km) at 22 kn (41 km/h; 25 mph)
- Complement: 5
- Sensors & processing systems: 1 × Raytheon R40X navigation radar
- Armament: 2 × single 12.7 mm machine guns; 2 × single 7.62 mm machine guns

Levera (PB-02) is a United States-built Dauntless-class patrol boat serving with the Royal Grenada Coast Guard. She was in service by September 1995 and was donated to Grenada in a foreign aid package. The builder was SeaArk, and the construction was completed at Monticello, Arkansas in the US.
