= Senate (Grenada) =

Upper house of the Parliament of Grenada

- 11th Parliament

Type
- Type: Upper house of the Parliament of Grenada

History
- Founded: 1967

Leadership
- President: Dessima Williams, NDC
- Deputy President: Norland Cox, NNP

Structure
- Seats: 13
- Political groups: His Majesty’s Government: National Democratic Congress (7); His Majesty’s Opposition: New National Party (3); Crossbench: Independent (3)
- Length of term: 5 years (Note: The general term lasts out the lifetime of the parliament, however Senators may at any time be dismissed by the Governor-General on the advice of the authority which advised their appointment.)

Elections
- Voting system: Appointment by the Governor-General

Meeting place
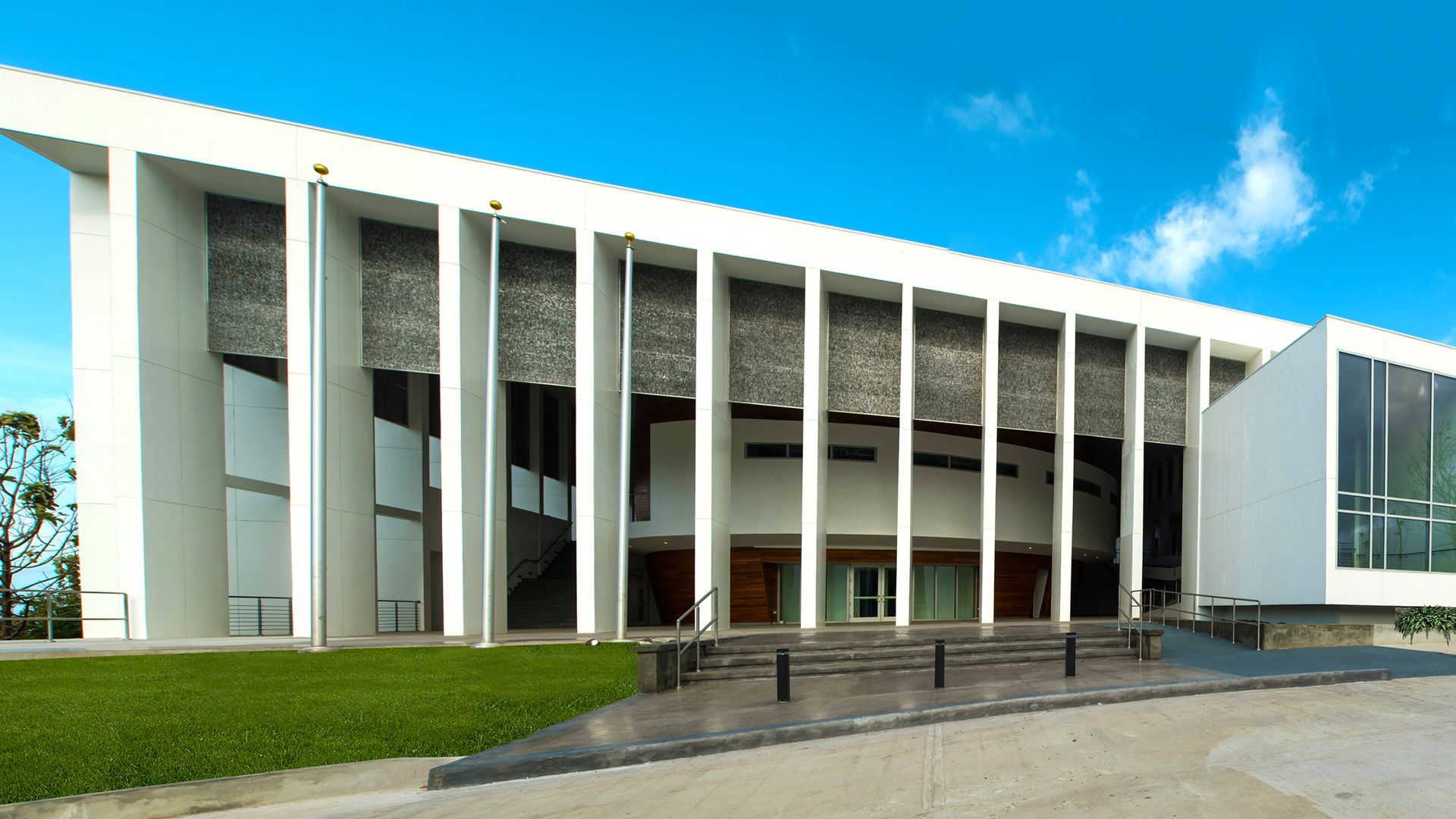
- New Houses of Parliament; Parliament Hill - Mt. Wheldale; St. George's; Grenada

Website
- grenadaparliament.gd

The Senate is the Upper chamber of the bicameral Parliament of Grenada. Together with the lower chamber, the House of Representatives, it meets in the New Houses of Parliament in the capital St. George's.

The current President of the Senate is Senator the Hon. Dessima Williams, with Senator the Hon. Norland Cox serving as Deputy President.

== Powers ==
Both the Senate and the lower House of Representatives constitutionally share most of the same powers, however, much as in other Westminster System Parliaments, the lower house is dominant. The Government of Grenada is for instance responsible only to the House of Representatives.

All legislation can be introduced and amended in either house with the exception of money bills, which must always originate in the House of Representatives. The Senate is further limited in the amendments it can make to them. If the budget is approved by the House of Representatives, but it is not approved un-amended by the Senate within one month, it can be directly submitted to the Governor-General for royal assent.

If regular legislation is approved by the House of Representatives twice in two consecutive sessions, but is not approved of by the Senate either time, it can also be submitted directly to the Governor-General.

== Composition ==
The Senate consists of 13 members appointed by the Governor-General. 7 members are appointed on the advice of the Prime Minister, three on the advice of the Leader of the Opposition, and three on the advice of the Prime Minister after they have consulted with societal interest groups. The current Senate convened on 31 August 2022, following the general election of 23 June.

In instances where there is no Leader of the Opposition, the Governor-General is empowered to, in their own discretion, appoint the 3 senators otherwise appointed on the advice of the opposition leader. A convention has, following the elections of 1999, 2013 and 2018 developed whereby the Governor-General will generally appoint members representing the defeated opposition party to the Senate in such circumstances.

=== Members of the Senate ===
The following are the current members of the Grenadian Senate.

Position	Senator
President of the Senate	Senator the Hon. Dr. Dessima Williams
Leader of Government Business	Senator the Hon. Adrian Thomas
Government Senator	Senator the Hon. Claudette Joseph
Government Senator	Senator the Hon. Seville M. C. Francis
Government Senator	Senator the Hon. Quinc Britton
Government Senator	Senator the Hon. David E. Andrew
Government Senator	Senator the Hon. Gloria Thomas
Deputy President of the Senate	Senator the Hon. Norland Cox
Opposition Senator	Senator the Hon. Dwight D. Horsford
Opposition Senator	Senator the Hon. Dr. Myanna Charles
Independent Senator (Fishers and Farmers Representative)	Senator the Hon. Roderick St Claire
Independent Senator (Labour Representative)	Senator the Hon. Andre Lewis
Independent Senator (Business Representative)	Senator the Hon. Salim F. Rahaman

== See also ==
- List of presidents of the Senate of Grenada
- Parliament of Grenada
- Politics of Grenada
- House of Representatives of Grenada
- List of legislatures by country
