= Trade unions in Grenada =

- National organization(s): Grenada Trades Union Council
- Density: 52% (2009)

International Labour Organization
- Grenada is a member of the ILO

Convention ratification
- Freedom of Association: 25 October 1994
- Right to Organise: 9 July 1979

Trade unions in Grenada first emerged in 1913 with the formation of the Grenada Union of Teachers. In 1920, the Grenada Association (GA) was formed in response to growing unemployment due to the return to the island of demobilised soldiers from World War One and the completion of the Panama Canal. However, the GA proved ineffective and was renamed the Grenada Workers' Association (GWA) in 1921. In 1931, the GWA was able to successfully mobilise against the introduction of price rises on milk and tobacco, basic goods essential to workers, and following further demands, in 1933 trade unions were made legal. However, following legalisation the GWA split in two; in 1933, the Grenada Workers Union and the Grenada General Workers Union were registered.

In 1955 the GWA and the GGWU formed the Grenada Trades Union Council (GTUC).

As of 2017, the following unions operated in Grenada:

| Union | Established | Sector |
|---|---|---|
| Bank and General Workers Union (BGWU) | 1977 | Finance / General |
| Commercial and Industrial Workers Union (CIWU) | 1956 | Commerce |
| Grenada Maritime Manual and Intellectual Workers Union (GMMIWU) | 1950 | General |
| Grenada Trades Union Council (GTUC) | 1955 | National centre |
| Grenada Union of Teachers (GUT) | 1913 | Education |
| Public Workers Union (PWU) | 1951 | Public services |
| Seamen and Waterfront Workers Trade Union (SWWU) | 1953 | Ports / Shipping |
| Taxi Owners and Drivers Association (TODA) | 1955 | Transport |
| Technical and Allied Workers Union (TAWU) | 1958 | Professional |

The TODA is the only union not affiliated to the GTUC.
