= Royal Grenada Coast Guard =

Military branch in Grenada

- Coast Guard emblem
- Active: 1984–present (current form)
- Country: Grenada
- Allegiance: Charles III, King of Grenada
- Type: Coast guard
- Role: Coastal defence, maritime law enforcement
- Part of: Royal Grenada Police Force
- Garrison/HQ: True Blue
- Motto: We Serve to Save

Commanders
- Governor-General: Dame Cécile La Grenade
- Minister of National Security: Dickon Mitchell
- Commissioner of Police: Randy Connaught
- Commander: Assistant Superintendent Watson Edwards

Insignia
- Coast Guard ensign

The Royal Grenada Coast Guard is the naval force of Grenada. It is a unit under the command of the Royal Grenada Police Force.

The Coast Guard's role is search and rescue as well as drug interdiction. The Coast Guard falls under the command of the Commissioner of Police and has a total of 60 personnel in service operating 7 craft. The branches headquarters is located at True Blue, south of Saint George's.

== Fleet ==
=== Patrol Boats ===
- 1 x U.S. Dauntless class
  - Patrol Boat Levera (PB02)
- 2 x U.S. Boston Whaler Series
  - PB03 and PB04
- 3 x Defender-class patrol boats
  - PB05, PB06 and PB07
- 1 x U.S. Utility boat
  - PB08
