= Parliament of Grenada =

Legislative body of Grenada

Coordinates: 12.05384°N 61.74536°W

- 11th Grenadian Parliament

Type
- Type: Bicameral
- Houses: Senate; House of Representatives

History
- Founded: 1967
- Preceded by: Legislative Council

Leadership
- Monarch: Charles III since 8 September 2022
- Governor-General: Cécile La Grenade since 7 May 2013
- President of the Senate: Dessima Williams, NDC since 31 August 2022
- Speaker of the House: Leo Cato since 31 August 2022
- Prime Minister: Dickon Mitchell, NDC since 24 June 2022
- Leader of His Majesty's Opposition: Adrian Joseph, NNP since 17 November 2026

Structure
- Seats: 28; 13 senators; 15 members of Parliament
- Senate political groups: HM Government: National Democratic Congress (7); HM Opposition: New National Party (3); Crossbench: Independent (3)
- House of Representatives political groups: HM Government: National Democratic Congress (14); HM Opposition: New National Party (1); Presiding officer: Speaker (1)

Elections
- Senate voting system: Appointed by the Governor-General on advice of the Prime Minister (10) and Opposition Leader (3)
- House of Representatives voting system: First-past-the-post
- Last House of Representatives election: 5 November 2026

Meeting place
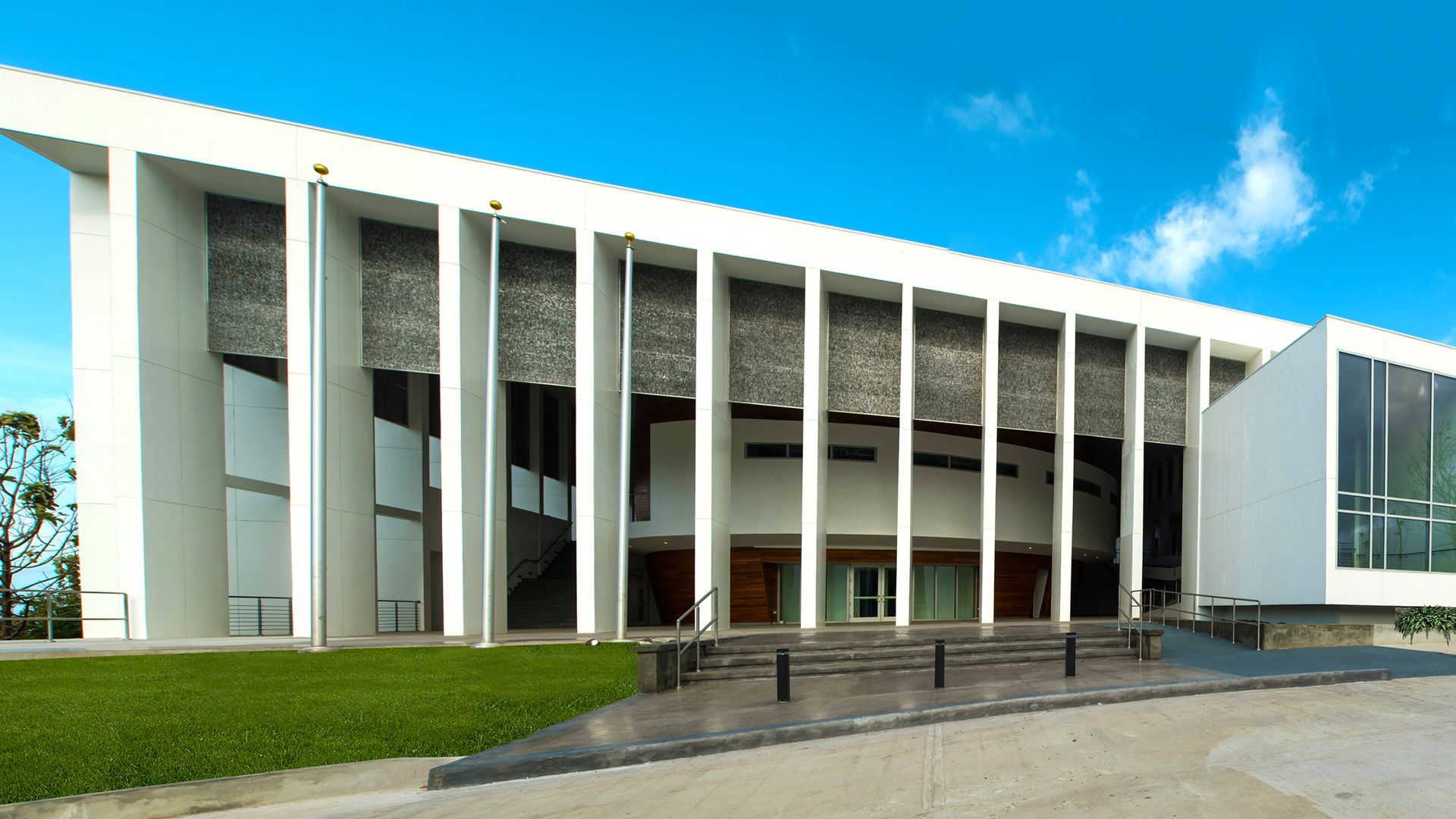
- New Houses of Parliament; St. George's; Grenada

Website
- grenadaparliament.gd

The Parliament of Grenada is the bicameral legislative body of Grenada. It is composed of the monarch and two chambers: the Senate and the House of Representatives. It operates from the New Houses of Parliament in St. George's.

Operating according to the British Westminster system, ministers of the government of Grenada are selected from the two houses, and responsible to the lower house of Parliament.

== Structure ==
Parliament consists of the King, represented by the Governor-General, the Senate and the House of Representatives. The Governor-General summons Parliament, brings its session to an end by prorogation, and formally assents to every bill before it can become law. In practice, they exercise all these powers on the advice of the Prime Minister and the Cabinet.

The passage of legislation depends on the participation of all three component parts of Parliament. A bill must be agreed to by both Houses and receive the Royal Assent before it can become an Act of Parliament. Of the two houses, the House of Representatives is dominant. Though legislation can be introduced in both houses, the Senate can ultimately only delay, not veto, legislation passed by the House. Furthermore, financial legislation may not be introduced in the Senate.

All Senators are appointed by the Governor-General on the advice of the Prime Minister of Grenada and the Leader of the Opposition.

The House of Representatives is directly elected by the people, and although by tradition the Senate is the Upper House and the House of Representatives is the Lower House, it is the House of Representatives which plays the predominant part in the parliamentary system.

=== Monarch ===
The King personifies the State. In law, he is the head of the Executive and an integral part of the legislature. In practice, all the King’s functions are exercised by the Governor-General, who in turn exercises all these powers on the advice of the Prime Minister and the Cabinet.

=== Senate ===
The Senate has 13 appointed members. Ten are appointed on the advice of the Prime Minister, with three of them being appointed "after he has consulted the organizations or interests which he considers the Senators should be selected to represent," and three are appointed on advice of the Leader of the Opposition. The National Democratic Congress has 7 seats in the senate, while the New National Party has 3. The remaining 3 seats are held by independents representing the labour movement, farmers and fishers, and the business community.

The main responsibilities of the Senate are:

- To act as a house of review with responsibility for expressing second opinion in relation to legislative and other proposals initiated in the House of Representatives.
- To ensure proper consideration of all legislation.
- To provide adequate scrutiny of financial measures.
- To initiate non-financial legislation as the Senate sees fit: the Senate’s capacity to initiate proposed legislation effectively means that Parliament is not confined in its opportunities for considering public issues in a legislative context to those matters covered by bills brought forward by the executive.
- To probe and check the administration of laws and to keep itself informed, and to insist on ministerial accountability for the administration of the Government.
- To provide effective scrutiny of Government and enable adequate expression of debate about policy and government programs. As a parliamentary forum, the Senate is one place where a government can be, of right, questioned and obliged to answer.

All bills must be passed by the Senate before they can become law, and it has the constitutional right to reject any bill and keep on rejecting it for up to 6 months. If the House of Representatives passes a bill after the Senate had rejected it for 6 months, it will be presented to the governor-general for assent without having been enacted by the Senate. It can also amend any bill, although it cannot initiate or increase the amount of any bill dealing with taxation or expenditure.

=== House of Representatives ===
The House of Representatives has 16 members: 15 elected for a five-year term in single-seat constituencies, and a speaker. The elections are by the first-past-the-post system. The National Democratic Congress currently holds a majority with 10 seats, while the opposition New National Party holds 4 seats in the House, with 1 seat being held by the Democratic People's Movement, having been elected for the NNP. The NDC’s majority of 9 from the 2022 election was increased following the defection of one NNP member of parliament in May 2023.

The House of Representatives is the focal point of parliamentary activity and public attention. Major national and international issues are debated there, and the Prime Minister and the Leader of the Opposition may be seen in regular confrontation. Cabinet Ministers defend the policies and conduct of their departments in open sessions that are publicly recorded.

Parliament makes the laws and the House of Representatives plays the predominant part in making them. Any member can introduce bills, except bills involving expenditure or taxation, which can only be introduced by the government. Since the responsibilities of government now extend into almost every sphere of activity, and since most government action involves spending money (and raising it by taxes, fees, loans, and so forth), most of the time of the House is spent on Government Bills.

Every bill must pass both Houses and receive the Royal Assent before it becomes law. Assent is signified by the Governor-General.

By law a general election must be held at least once every five years. However, Parliament may be dissolved and an election called before the statutory period has elapsed, and this is what normally happens. The power to dissolve Parliament is a royal prerogative exercised by the Governor-General, normally on the advice of the Prime Minister.

The House of Representatives was modeled on the British House of Commons, and even now, in any matter of procedure not provided for by its own rules and practices, the rules and practices of the House of Commons are followed.

== History ==
The Parliament of Grenada has its origin in the colonial General Assembly, established in 1766 after the annexation of Grenada by Great Britain following the 1763 Treaty of Paris. The General Assembly was bicameral, consisting of the elected House of Assembly and His Majesty’s Council, which was appointed by the colonial governor. Though elected, the franchise for the House of Assembly was extremely restrictive, leaving the majority of the population without the right to vote or stand for election.

Representative government was abolished in 1876, when the General Assembly passed a resolution asking for its own dissolution and the implementation of Crown colony government. This resulted in the assembly’s replacement with a wholly-appointed Legislative Council, responsible to the governor.

In 1925, reforms introduced 5 elected members onto the 16 member council, with the first election since the 1870s held in February 1925. Further reforms steadily increased the number and influence of elected members, until the Grenada Constitution Order of 1959 introduced responsible government, with an Executive Council headed by a Chief Minister responsible to the elected members of the Legislative Council.

The current structure of Parliament, following the Westminster system closely modelled upon the British Parliament with an elected House of Representatives and an appointed Senate, was introduced in 1967 when Grenada was granted complete internal self-government, becoming an associated state of the United Kingdom. This structure was carried over after independence in 1974.

== Symbols ==
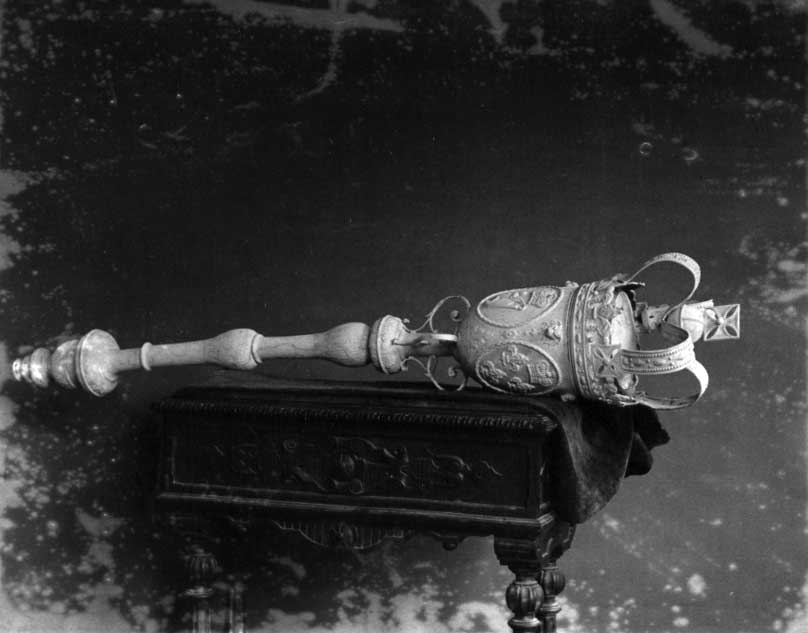
Mace of the House of Representatives

The coat of arms of the Grenadian parliament consists of the coat of arms of Grenada above two crossed ceremonial maces, representing the maces of the House of Representatives and the Senate. The maces represent the authority of the Crown in Parliament, and proceedings may not take place unless they are present in the chamber.

The Mace of the House of Representatives was created in the 1780s for the House of Assembly, and is made of gilded silver. The top of the mace bears images of Grenada’s 1783 badge, the Royal arms of Great Britain, English roses, Scottish thistles, the Irish harp and three Fleur de lys. It is surmounted by a Crown.

The mace of the Senate was created in 1967. Much smaller in size, the Senate mace is likewise surmounted by a Crown and bears images of Grenada’s 1903-1974 badge as well as the Royal cypher of Elizabeth II.

== Ceremony ==
The start of each new session of Parliament is marked by the Ceremonial State Opening of Parliament. During the Ceremonial State Opening the monarch, or in their absence the governor-general, reads the Speech from the Throne. The speech, which is written by the prime minister, lays out the priorities of the government for the coming year.

Each sitting of either house is traditionally preceded by prayer.

== Meeting place ==
Parliament meets at the New Houses of Parliament in St. George's. Prior to the building’s opening in 2018 it had met in the Grenada Trade Centre since 2004, following the destruction of York House by Hurricane Ivan. York House had previously housed Parliament and the preceding Legislative Council and General Assembly since 1801.

Despite being a bicameral legislature, the parliament building has only one chamber. Both the House and the Senate utilise the same chamber for sittings on different days.

== See also ==
- Politics of Grenada
- List of legislatures by country
- House of Representatives of Grenada
- Senate of Grenada
- List of speakers of the House of Representatives of Grenada
- List of presidents of the Senate of Grenada
- Leader of the Opposition (Grenada)
