= List of presidents of the Senate of Grenada =

Below is a complete list of presidents of the Senate of Grenada.

Name	Took office	Left office	Notes
Hon. Dr. John Watts	1966	1967	
Hon. Thomas Joseph Gibbs	1967	1968	
Hon. Greaves Beresford James, OBE	1968	1979	
In abeyance	1979	1984	
Hon. Lawrence Albert Joseph	1984	1988	
Hon. Dr. John Watts, KCMG, CBE	1988	1990	
Hon. Margaret Neckles	April 1990	1995	
Hon. Dr. John Watts, KCMG CBE	1995	2004	
Hon. Leslie-Ann Seon	9 January 2004	27 February 2006	
Hon. Kenny Lalsingh	3 March 2006	3 June 2008	
Hon. Joan Purcell	20 August 2008	9 January 2013	
Hon. Lawrence Albert Joseph	27 March 2013	24 December 2014	
Hon. Chester Humphrey	24 December 2014	31 August 2022	
Hon. Dessima Williams	31 August 2022	Present	
