= Grenada Trades Union Council =

GTUC
- Grenada Trades Union Council
- Founded: 1955
- Headquarters: St. George's, Grenada
- Location: Grenada
- Key people: Andre Lewis, President
- Affiliations: ITUC

The Grenada Trades Union Council (GTUC) is the national trade union center for Grenada. It was formed in 1955, and is affiliated with the International Trade Union Confederation.

== See also ==
- Trade unions in Grenada
- List of federations of trade unions
