= 2025 in Grenada =

- Decades: 2000s; 2010s; 2020s
- See also: Other events of 2025; Timeline of Jamaican history

Events in the year 2025 in Grenada.

== Incumbents ==
- Monarch: Charles III
- Governor-General: Dame Cécile La Grenade
- Prime Minister: Dickon Mitchell

== Events ==
- 19 March – A small plane with 4 passengers crashes near Maurice Bishop International Airport.
- 30 July – Three escaped prisoners are convicted and sentenced to life imprisonment for hijacking a catamaran and killing its two American occupants in 2024.

== Holidays ==
- 1 January - New Year's Day
- 7 February – Independence Day
- 18 April – Good Friday
- 21 April – Easter Monday
- 1 May – Labour Day
- 9 June – Whit Monday
- 19 June – Corpus Christi
- 4 August – Emancipation Day
- 11–12 August – Carnival
- 19 October – National Heroes Day
- 25 October – Thanksgiving Day
- 25 December – Christmas Day
- 26 December – Boxing Day

== See also ==
- 2020s
- 2025 Atlantic hurricane season
- 2025 in the Caribbean
