= Dessima Williams =

Grenadian diplomat

Dessima D. Williams
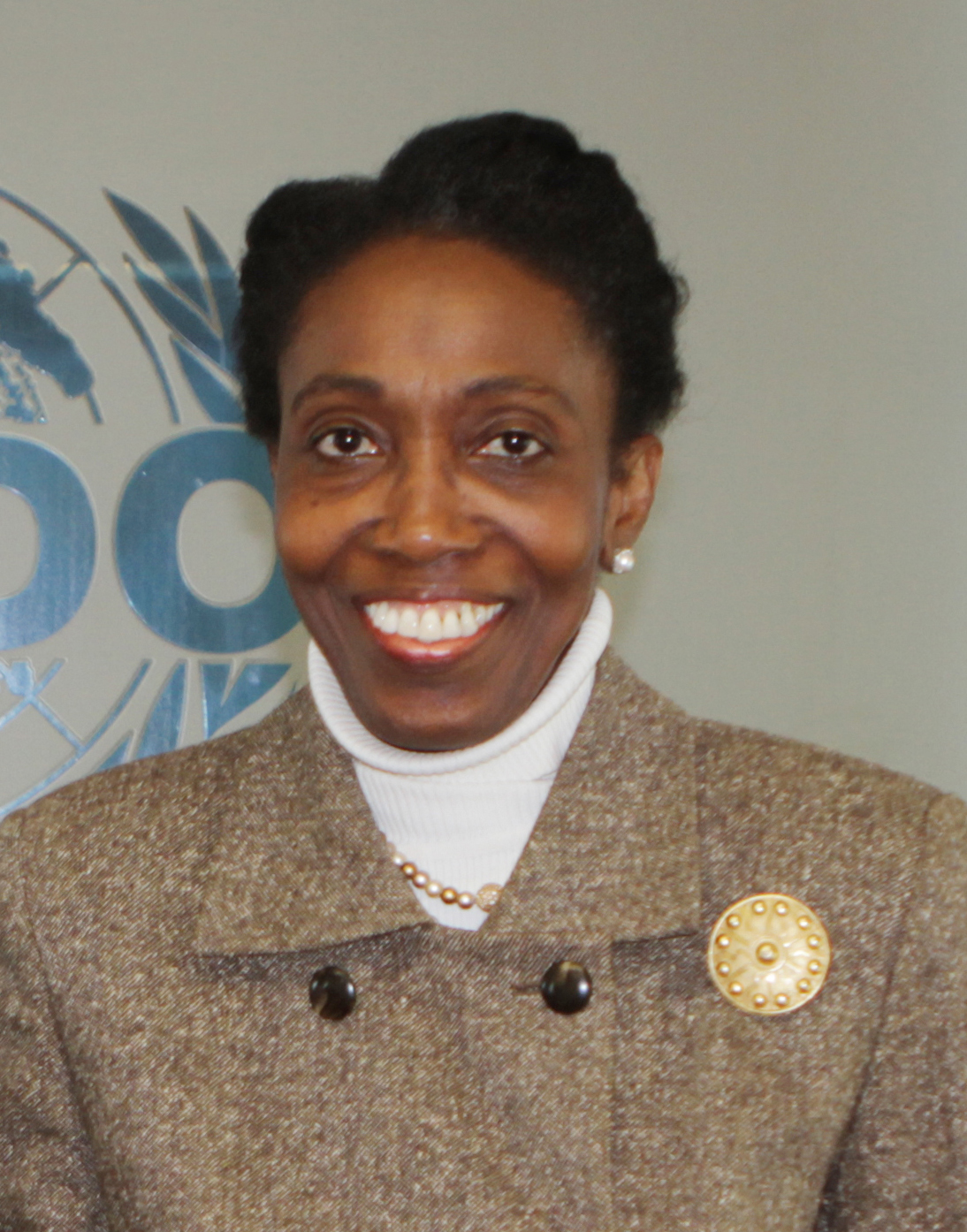
- Williams in 2014

President of the Senate
- Incumbent
- Assumed office 31 August 2022
- Prime Minister: Dickon Mitchell
- Preceded by: Chester Humphrey

Personal details
- Born: 20 December 1950 (age 75)
- Education: American University; University of Minnesota
- Occupation: Diplomat and former Ambassador to the United Nations

Dessima D. Williams is a Grenadian diplomat and former Ambassador to the United Nations from Grenada who was reappointed to the ambassadorship in 2008. Since 2022 she has been President of the Senate. She was a professor of sociology, development and gender at Brandeis University in Waltham, Massachusetts, US, as well as serving as the Alliance of Small Island States (AOSIS) chair during COP15 in Copenhagen (2009–2011). She is currently a Strategic Adviser to Oxfam on climate change. She is also the founder and Director of the Grenada Education and Development Programme (GRENED).

== Personal life ==
Williams was born on 20 December 1950. She works in her own country to highlight the challenges of Small Islands Developing States (SIDS) for the education of rural boys and girls. She is an organic farmer and an exponent of a non-toxic lifestyle, especially to reduce the use of plastics. She promotes a sustainable lifestyle through diet, walking rather than driving where possible, and letting others know about the SDGs.

== Education ==
Williams holds a Ph.D. and a master's degree in International Relations from American University. She has a bachelor's degree in International Relations from the University of Minnesota.

== Career ==
Williams served in the leadership of Grenada's short-lived New Jewel Movement, then as Grenada's ambassador to the Organization of American States during People's Revolutionary Government from 1979 to 1983. She was Deputy Governor to the World Bank and Deputy Permanent Representative to the Inter-American Commission of Women. At the Organization of American States, she shepherded resolutions such as the Caribbean as a Zone of Peace, Development and Independence and promotion of small island states.

At 32 years of age, she was named ambassador to the United States by Grenada's Prime Minister Maurice Bishop, whose murder Aug. 12, 1983, set off a bloody power struggle on the island nation that led to the US invasion of Grenada. The Reagan administration refused to accept her credentials as ambassador. On October 25, 1984, Dessima Williams was arrested by INS agents in Washington while Ronald Reagan was in the White House celebrating the first anniversary of his invasion of the tiny island. The agents of the U.S. Immigration and Naturalization Service apprehended her as she was leaving a forum on "Peace in the Americas" at Howard University. Of the arrest, Willams said: "I had just made the keynote address at a conference on Peace in the Caribbean at Howard University. As I left, about six men suddenly approached me. They indicated I was under arrest and that I should get into the car. I had already been pushed against the open door. I was standing there, baffled: "Why have I been arrested and what is this all about?" The men—they were armed—tried to keep people away from me. Then one fellow grabbed me by the neck from behind and the other one pushed his hand in my pelvic area and the other hand on my head, and they crumpled me into the car. All I knew was that there were these aggressive, hostile white males speeding off with me in a civilian car. We eventually arrived at a jail, and a woman matron began to search me. She found some little buttons that said, "Maurice Bishop's Spirit Lives." She said, "They're weapons. They have sharp points." I had a lot of foreign currency from years of travelling. "These are very important documents." I was put in a tiny cell and released on bail in the morning. The charge was that I was living here illegally. In fact, I'd been going back and forth from Grenada for eleven or twelve years."

Dessima has taught at secondary, college and university levels and is an advocate for the rights of women and girls, for farmers and for rural development. She founded the Grenada Education and Development Programme, which supports Grenada's students as emerging leaders. She has also owned the Rainbow Inn in St Andrew, Grenada.

Williams taught political science at Williams College in Massachusetts before joining the faculty of Brandeis University in 1992.

In 2009, Williams returned to diplomacy as Ambassador Extraordinary and Plenipotentiary of Grenada to the United Nations, serving for over four years, three of those concurrently as Chair of the Alliance of Small Island Developing States. In this capacity, she led a 40-island global climate change effort that recorded the high ambition of keeping average global temperatures to 1.5 degrees in the Copenhagen Accord of 2009, which was later included in the 2015 Paris Agreement.

In 2016 Williams was appointed as Special Adviser for Implementation of the Sustainable Development Goals (SDGs) at the United Nations (UN). Williams was in charge of the team for the implementation of the SDGs in the office of the President of the General Assembly for the 71st session. Her leadership secured early investment for the island renewable energy organization, SIDS-DOCK, and Williams participated in numerous sustainable development and political meetings, including Rio+20 and the first and third United Nations Conferences on Small Island Developing States.

In 2022, Williams was appointed President of the Grenada Senate by the newly elected National Democratic Congress (NDC) government, replacing Chester Humphrey.
