= 2024 in Grenada =

- Decades: 2000s; 2010s; 2020s
- See also: Other events of 2024; Timeline of Jamaican history

Events in the year 2024 in Grenada.

== Incumbents ==
- Monarch: Charles III
- Governor-General: Dame Cécile La Grenade
- Prime Minister: Dickon Mitchell

== Events ==
- July 1 – Hurricane Beryl makes landfall on the island of Carriacou as a category 4 hurricane, leaving three people dead across the country.
- July 26–August 11 – Grenada at the 2024 Summer Olympics

== Holidays ==
- 1 January - New Year's Day
- 7 February – Independence Day
- 29 March – Good Friday
- 1 April - Easter Monday
- 1 May - Labour Day
- 20 May - Whit Monday
- 30 May - Corpus Christi
- 5 August - Emancipation Day
- 12–13 August - Carnival
- 19 October – National Heroes Day
- 25 October – Thanksgiving Day
- 25 December – Christmas Day
- 26 December – Boxing Day

== Deaths ==
- 7 February: Anthony C. George, 86, artist, designer of the flag of Grenada.
- 2 October: Daniel Williams, 88, Governor-General of Grenada (1996-2008).

== See also ==
- 2020s
- 2024 Atlantic hurricane season
- 2024 in the Caribbean
