= Fort George, Grenada =

Military fort in St. George's, Grenada

Coordinates: 12°02′57″N 61°45′14″W

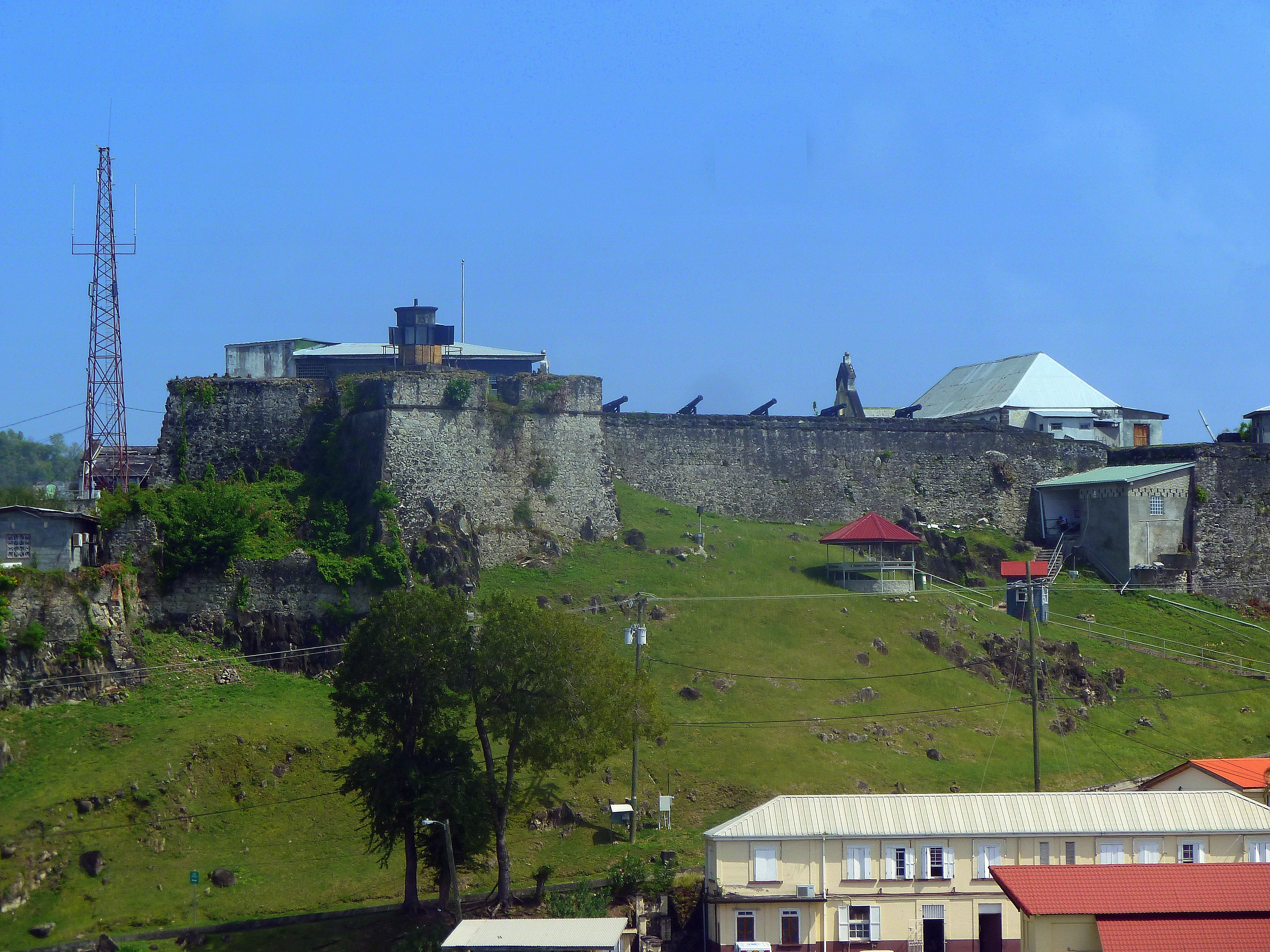
Fort walls, 2012

Fort George is a former military fortification in Grenada. The fort overlooks the harbour of the capital St. George's and was built by the French between 1706 and 1710, as Fort Royal. The island passed into British hands in 1763 and the fort was renamed Fort George after the reigning monarch George III. The fort surrendered to a French force during the Anglo-French War (1778–1783) but passed back to Britain after the end of that war. The fort was given to the government of Grenada when independence was granted in 1974. Following a communist revolution in 1979 it was renamed Fort Rupert after the father of Maurice Bishop, leader of the People's Revolutionary Government. Bishop was executed in the fort's courtyard during a factional coup in 1983. Democracy was restored after the October 1983 US invasion and the name of Fort George was reinstated. The fort was home to the headquarters of the Royal Grenada Police Force until 2024 and is now a tourist attraction.

== History ==
=== French and British use ===
A colony of the French West India Company was established on the island in 1650 but was relatively unsuccessful. The colony began to grow after the French government assumed control of it in 1674, coming into conflict with the indigenous Kalinago (Island Carib) people. An artillery battery was established at what is now the fort in the 17th century, a location overlooking the harbour at St. George's.

The fort was constructed by the French authorities between 1706 and 1710 and named Fort Royal. Its polygonal layout and projecting bastions reflect the style of defensive architecture advocated by French military engineer Sébastien Le Prestre, Marquis of Vauban.

In 1763 the island passed to Great Britain under the Treaty of Paris that ended the Seven Years' War. The British renamed the fortification Fort George, after George III, who was then king. In 1779, during the Anglo-French War (1778–1783) a French force landed on the island and approached Fort George from the landward side. The position of the fort, while excellent for controlling the harbour, meant it was overlooked by higher ground. The British defenders surrendered shortly after French artillery opened fire on the fort from the superior position. British control was reinstated at the end of the war and work began on the St. George Fortified System around the capital, which included Fort George and seven other defensive positions. These were designed to resist an invading European army and also internal slave revolts or attacks by the Kalinago.

=== Post-independence ===
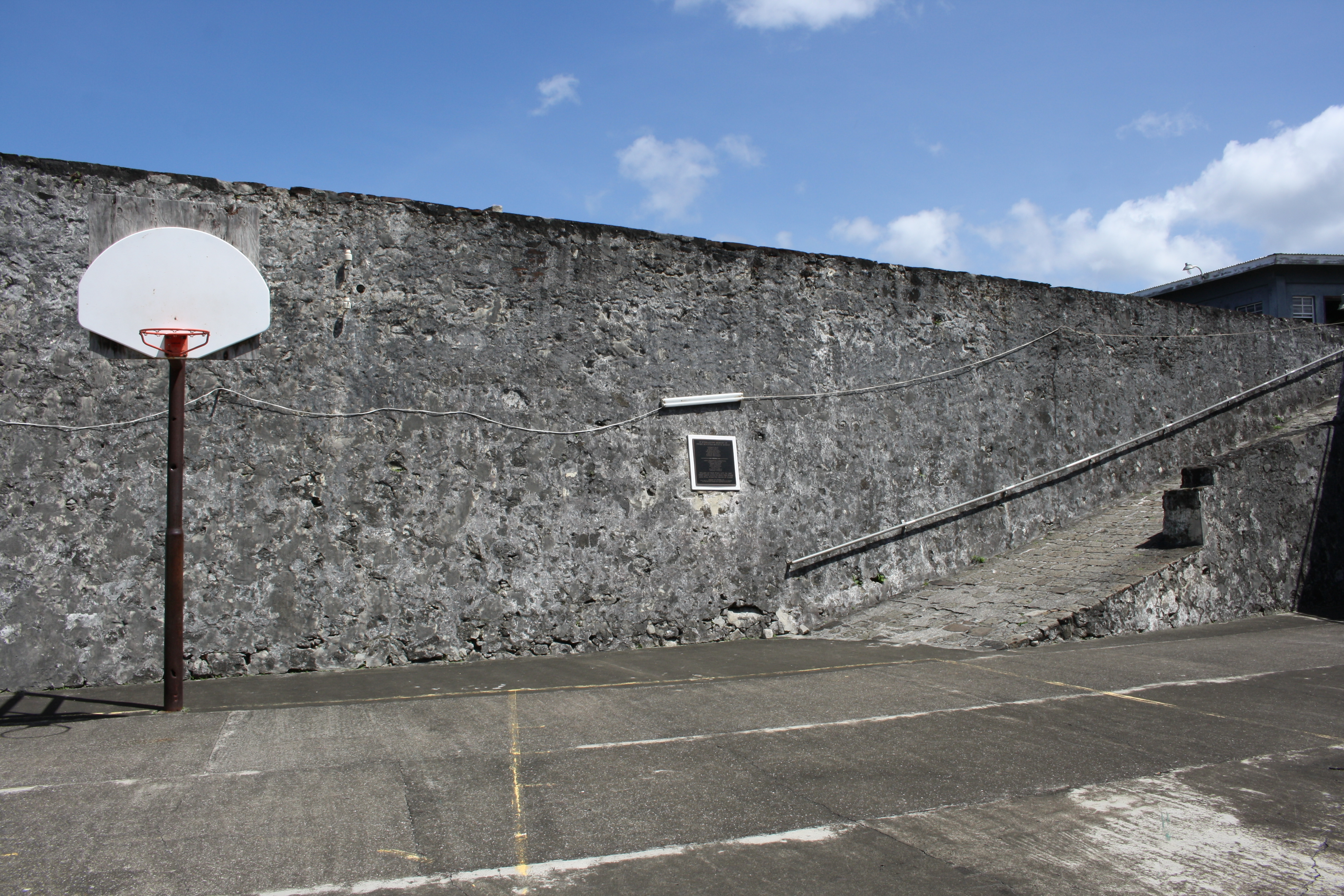
Site of the execution of Maurice Bishop and plaque, 2016

Following independence from Britain in 1974 the fort has entered the ownership of the government of Grenada. Of the eight defensive forts in the system only Fort George, Fort Mathew and Fort Frederick remain standing.

Following the 1979 overthrow of Sir Eric Gairy's government and the establishment of the communist People's Revolutionary Government, the fort was renamed Fort Rupert after the father of the country's new leader Maurice Bishop. The fort served as the headquarters of the new government's People's Revolutionary Army from 1979 to 1983. In October 1983 Bishop was overthrown by the Organization for Revolutionary Education and Liberation faction and was executed by firing squad in the courtyard of the fort, alongside seven others, on 19 October.

Democracy was restored to Grenada following the late October 1983 US invasion and the fort returned to the Fort George name. The headquarters and training school of the Royal Grenada Police Force were established in the fort. In October 1993 a plaque was installed in the courtyard to mark the site of the 1983 killings; in 2024 the government committed to installing a permanent shrine on the site. The reconstruction of the adjacent hospital, following a fire, has had an adverse effect on views to and from the fort.

By 1999, Fort George was being promoted by the Grenada Tourist Board. Still, public access was limited, and no facilities were in place to accommodate the approximately 3,000 visitors per year. By 2013, there was little of historic interest to view apart from the walls, and some underground rooms, but some colonial-era artillery pieces remain in place on the walls. By 2018, some of the fort was in disrepair due to hurricane damage. In 2023 Economic Development Minister Lennox Andrews announced plans to develop Fort George into a major tourist destination, to include renovation of a historic tunnel and creation of a museum and restaurant. As part of the redevelopment, the police headquarters were moved out of the fort and into an office in the city by 2024.

== Heritage status ==
The system of surviving forts that includes Fort George has been placed onto UNESCO's World Heritage Tentative List for consideration to become a World Heritage Site.
