= COVID-19 pandemic in Grenada =

- Disease: COVID-19
- Pathogen: SARS-CoV-2
- Location: Grenada
- Arrival date: 16 March 2020 (6 years, 5 months and 2 days)
- Confirmed cases: 5888 (as of 26 Nov 2021)
- Active cases: 66
- Recovered: 5622
- Deaths: 200

The COVID-19 pandemic in Grenada was part of the viral pandemic of coronavirus disease 2019 (COVID-19), which was confirmed to have reached Grenada on March 22, 2020. Despite lockdowns and social distancing protocols, it appeared to have reached the level of community spread within one month. However, cases continued to decline through May, and by June 18, 2020, the Ministry of Health declared zero active cases — indicating Grenada's efforts were successful in ridding the country of the virus. This situation continued until December 2020, when a small outbreak occurred (including the island's first Covid-related death), associated with the Sandals Resort and a "travel corridor" that did not require guests to be tested for COVID-19. However, this incident notwithstanding, the vast majority of cases in Grenada through August 2021 were those caught during quarantine confinement of incoming travelers. In August 2021, an outbreak of the delta variant resulted in substantial community spread and nearly 200 deaths. By mid-October 2021, however, the outbreak was largely contained and life returned to normal, although a small amount of community spread continued through the rest of 2021.

== Background ==
On 12 January 2020, the World Health Organization (WHO) confirmed that a novel coronavirus was the cause of a respiratory illness in a cluster of people in Wuhan City, Hubei Province, China, which was reported to the WHO on 31 December 2019.

The case fatality ratio for COVID-19 has been much lower than SARS of 2003, but the transmission has been significantly greater, with a significant total death toll. Like most countries, Grenada had increased screening at the airport in early February and begun sending test samples to CARPHA. At 12am on March 23, the airport was closed to commercial passenger traffic indefinitely, and on June 28 it was announced to remain closed until at least the end of July.

== Timeline ==
Cases

Deaths

Active Cases Since March 2020

Total Deaths Since March 2020 (officially confirmed as COVID-19)

Active Cases Prior to August 2021

Mid-2021 Surge In Detail (Active Cases)

Mid-2021 Surge In Detail (Daily Deaths)

=== March to April 2020 ===
- March 22—The country's first case ("Patient Zero") was announced, a 50-year-old female patient who returned from the United Kingdom on March 16 and subsequently became sick on March 17, and was officially diagnosed on March 21. At 11:59pm, the airport was shut-down, indefinitely.
- March 25—Six more cases announced (5 female, 1 male, ages 50–80), all from Patient Zero's household. The government institutes policy of restricted movement and nightly curfew.
- March 28—Two more cases announced (2 female, ages 50–80), one sat nearby Patient Zero on the March 16 flight; another had relatives visiting from New York City, arrived March 17. The one who sat near Patient Zero on the March 16 flight was a 50-year-old male who became symptomatic on March 26, was tested in Grenada and told to self-quarantine while awaiting the results. Instead, he fled with his family via an Air Canada flight en route back to the UK before the test results were returned (which were a positive diagnosis).
- March 29—Government announces 24-hour curfew for one week
- April 1— One new case announced—a 58-year-old male who arrived on a flight from New York City on March 19
- April 3— Two new cases announced. One was a 73-year-old male whose spouse had been diagnosed and announced on March 28 (sat near Patient Zero on the March 16 flight from the UK); the other patient was a taxi driver who had interacted with a previously diagnosed patient
- April 5— The Queen of Grenada addressed the Commonwealth in a televised broadcast, in which she asked people to "take comfort that while we may have more still to endure, better days will return". She added, "we will be with our friends again; we will be with our families again; we will meet again".
- April 6— Government renews curfew/lockdown for another two weeks (through April 20). Tests are now being done at St. George's University.
- April 10— Two cases announced, all from households of previous cases (total= 14 positive, 92 tests in total).
- April 18— Government extended the 24-hour curfew for an additional week (through April 27), although with increased exceptions during designated "shopping" days and expectation of relaxing the curfew after this final curfew period.
- April 20— Case #15: First potential case of community spread announced by Minister Nickolas Steele, in which an individual had been admitted to the General Hospital and tested positive on the rapid (antibody) test (confirmed via PCR on 22-April as Case #15). The 45 year-old-man initially tested negative via the rapid test, then positive in a subsequent test later on. Several samples were then tested via PCR on island (at St. George's University) and via CARPHA, the results of which were indeed positive.
- April 25— Three new cases were announced, two from the workplace of Case #15 and one unrelated. The two workers (male, ages 62 an 59) were found through contact-tracing. The third case was a 50-year-old female that had arrived on-island on March 16, subsequently self-quarantined, and then requested a test on her own initiative, despite not exhibiting any symptoms. This 18th case has raised suspicion as to whether it was actually import-related (38 days after having arrived) or whether she acquired it in Grenada. Two of her roommates also tested positive for antibodies, suggesting they had the virus previously and since recovered. These additional cases were not added to the official case tally.
- April 28— One new case announced (another workplace colleague of Case #15); additionally, 3 new cases recovered (totaling 10 recovered now, 8 active, 1 off-island).
- April 29— 20th case announced (a 54-year-old female relative of one of the previous workplace cases), along with 3 recoveries of previous cases. This marks five workers testing positive from the Caribbean Agro flour factory in Tempe, St. George's.

=== May to August 2020 ===
- May 2— Case #21 announced, another one from the Tempe factory (related to Case #15), this time a male in his early 20s—the youngest patient yet, and one who was asymptomatic and initially tested negative (two rapid tests are typically given over a few days and this individual tested positive on the second time and then positive with a subsequent PCR test).
- May 10— with no additional cases, government announced a relaxation of the curfew and semi-regular business operations starting Monday, May 11.
- May 15— Grenada recorded its 22nd positive COVID-19 patient - an asymptomatic 8-year-old female (the youngest case yet), also related to case #15.
- May 25— A returned cruise-ship worker who had been quarantined upon repatriation on May 24 tested positive. Since the case had been quarantined upon arrival, it did not change current reopening efforts, but Minister Steele warned that cases like this will continue as the country opens up, so the main focus is on identifying and containing it each time.
- June 17— Eight repatriated cruise ship workers tested positive on the antibody test but not PCR. Nonetheless, as with May 25 case, the government appears unwilling to include positive repatriated cases in the country's official tally.
- June 18— With no new (local) cases reported in June, those previously diagnosed continued to recover, eventually testing negative on two PCR tests, spaced one week apart. On June 18, the Ministry of Health declared there were no active cases remaining in Grenada, as indicated by their continued testing regime.
- June 28— It was announced that the airport will remain closed until at least the end of July.

=== September to December 2020 ===
- As on 19 September, Grenada was Covid free. Total number of cases was 24, all of them recovered.
- As on 4 October, Grenada was Covid free. Total number of cases was 24, all of them recovered.
- As on 14 October, total number of cases was 25, with 1 active case and the rest recovered.
- As on 20 October, total number of cases was 27, with 3 active cases and the rest recovered.
- As on 28 October, total number of cases was 28, with 4 active cases and 24 have recovered.
- As on 8 November, total number of cases in Grenada was 32, with 5 active cases and 27 recoveries.
- As on 16 November, total number of cases in Grenada was 33, with 4 active cases and 29 cures.
- As on 23 November, total number of cases was 41, with 11 active cases and 30 cures.
- As on 5 December, total number of cases in Grenada was 41, with 2 active cases and 39 recoveries.
- As on 8 December, total number of cases in Grenada was 43, with 2 active cases and 41 cures.
- As on 13 December, total number of cases in Grenada was 69, with 28 active cases and 41 have recovered.
- As on 14 December, total number of cases in Grenada was 85, with 41 active cases and 44 recoveries.
- As on 15 December, total number of cases was 94, with 41 active cases and 53 cures. The surge in cases appeared to originate from guests staying at the Sandals Grenada resort that infected workers, who then spread the virus throughout the south of the island. Sandals was apparently part of a special "corridor" program that did not require guests to be tested for COVID-19, so long as they stayed on the resort grounds.
- As on 20 December, total number of cases was 103, with 49 active cases and 54 cures.
- As on 21 December, total number of cases was 105, with 49 active cases and 56 cures.
- As on 27 December, total number of cases was 124, with 46 active cases and 78 cures.
- As on 30 December, total number of cases was 127, with 20 active cases and 107 cures.

=== January to April 2021 ===
- As on 6 January, total number of cases in Grenada was 127, with 19 active cases, 107 recoveries. 1 person died from the virus.
- As on 12 January, total number of cases was 132, with 8 active cases, 123 recoveries and 1 person died from the virus.
- As on 18 January, total number of cases was 139, with 9 active cases, 129 recoveries and 1 death.
- As on 25 January, total number of cases was 148, with 12 active cases, 135 recoveries and 1 death.
- As on 28 January, total number of cases was 148, with 11 active cases, 136 cures and 1 death.
- As on 1 February, total number of cases was 148, with 5 active cases, 142 cures and 1 death.
- As on 7 February, total number of cases was 148, with 1 active cases, 146 recoveries and 1 death.
- As on 23 February, total number of cases was 148. There isn't any active case, 1 person died and rest 147 have recovered.
- As on 6 March, total number of cases remains 148. There isn't any active case, 1 person died and rest 147 have recovered.
- As on 22 March, total number of cases was 154, including 1 active cases, 151 recoveries and 2 deaths.
- As on 29 March, total number of cases was 155, including 1 active cases, 152 recoveries and 2 deaths.
- No new case was reported in Grenada for more than 2 weeks now. As on 11 April, total number of cases was 155, including 1 active cases, 152 recoveries and 2 deaths.

=== May to August 2021 ===
- As of 1 May, total number of cases in Grenada was 160, with 1 active case, 158 recoveries and 1 death.
- As of 12 May, total number of cases in Grenada was 161, with no active case, 160 recoveries and 1 death.
- As of 30 June, total number of cases in Grenada was 162, with 1 active case, 161 recoveries and 1 death.
- As of 13 July, total number of cases in Grenada was 162, with no active case, 161 recoveries and 1 death.
- As of 30 August, total number of cases in Grenada was 357, with 164 active case, 192 recoveries and 1 death.

=== September to October 2021 (major outbreak) ===
- As of 2 September, total confirmed cases in Grenada were 817, with 124 imported cases, 599 active cases, 214 recovered cases and 4 deaths. Out of 599 active cases, 9 were active imported cases and 590 were active local cases.
- As of 3 September, total confirmed cases in Grenada were 1098, with 124 imported cases, 868 active cases, 225 recovered cases and 5 deaths. Out of 868 active cases, 9 were active imported cases and 859 were active local cases.
- As of 9 September, total number of cases in Grenada was 1947, with 1576 active case, 352 recoveries and 19 deaths.
- As of 22 September, total number of cases in Grenada was 4552, with 2194 active case, 2273 cures and 85 deaths.
- As of 28 September, total number of cases in Grenada was 5039, with 1543 active case, 3361 recoveries and 135 fatalities.
- As of 9 October, total number of cases was 5619, with 364 active case, 5078 recoveries and 177 fatalities.

=== November to December 2021 ===
- In October, active cases continued to fall, bottoming out at 53 active cases on November 18, and only two additional deaths in October. On November 19, however, cases began to slowly climb upwards again.
- As of 19 November, total number of cases was 5866, with 54 active case, 5612 cures and 200 deaths.
- As of 29 December, total number of cases was 6009, with 124 active case, 5685 cures and 200 deaths.

=== January to March 2022 ===
- As of 4 January, total number of cases in Grenada was 6787, with 873 active case, 5714 cures and 200 deaths.
- As of 8 January, total number of cases was 7669, with 1736 active case, 5733 cures and 200 deaths.
- As of 22 January, total number of cases was 11190, with 2609 active case, 8376 cures and 205 fatalities.
- As of 25 January, total number of cases was 11816, with 2142 active case, 9467 recoveries and 207 fatal cases.
- As of 4 February, total number of cases was 12774, with 851 active case, 11712 recoveries and 211 deaths.
- As of 11 February, total number of cases was 13172, with 456 active cases, 12503 recoveries and 213 deaths.
- As of 21 February, total number of cases was 13532, with 204 active cases, 13114 cures and 214 deaths.
- As of 25 February, total number of cases was 13661, with 229 active cases, 13218 cures and 214 fatalities.
- As of 27 February, total number of cases was 13679, with 209 active cases, 13258 cures and 216 deaths.
- As of 3 March, total number of cases was 13690, with 138 active cases, 13336 recoveries and 216 deaths.
- As of 18 March, total number of cases was 13936, with 217 active cases, 13659 cures and 217 deaths.

=== April to June 2022 ===
- As of 8 April, total number of cases in Grenada was 14024, with 58 active cases, 13748 cures and 218 deaths.
- As of 13 April, total number of cases was 14092, with 66 active cases, 13807 recoveries and 219 deaths.
- As of 25 April, total number of cases was 14428, with 263 active cases, 13945 cures and 220 fatal cases.
- As of 1 May, total number of cases was 14743, with 412 active cases, 14111 cures and 220 deaths.
- As of 11 May, total number of cases was 16014, with 1181 active cases, 14612 cures and 221 fatalities.
- As of 26 May, total number of cases was 17482, with 891 active cases, 16366 have recovered and 225 deaths.
- As of 13 June, total number of cases was 18035, with 281 active cases, 17523 have recovered and 231 deaths.
- As of 23 June, total number of cases was 18205, with 126 active cases, 17849 have cured and 232 deaths.

=== July to December 2022 ===
- As of 8 July, total number of cases in Grenada was 18531, with 178 active cases, 18120 have cured and 233 deaths.
- As of 19 July, total number of cases was 18655, with 156 active cases, 18266 have cured and 233 deaths.
- As of 26 August, total number of cases was 19268, with 261 active cases, 18266 recoveries and 236 deaths.
- As of 7 September, total number of cases was 19403, with 109 active cases, 19058 have cured and 236 fatal cases.

=== January 2023 onwards ===
- As of 30 January 2023, total number of cases in Grenada was 19680, with 84 active cases, 19354 have cured and 238 fatal cases.

== Prevention ==
=== Emergency powers ===
The government of Prime minister Keith Mitchell instituted a series of increasingly tightening social distancing and quarantine policies that eventually led to a full country lockdown. Prior to the island's first case (but in anticipation of it occurring), schools and public gatherings were banned and social distancing encouraged on March 14. It was known that at least three persons who later tested positive to COVID-19 elsewhere had traveled through Grenada. Following the first confirmed case on March 22, the airport was closed to commercial traffic and remained closed indefinitely.

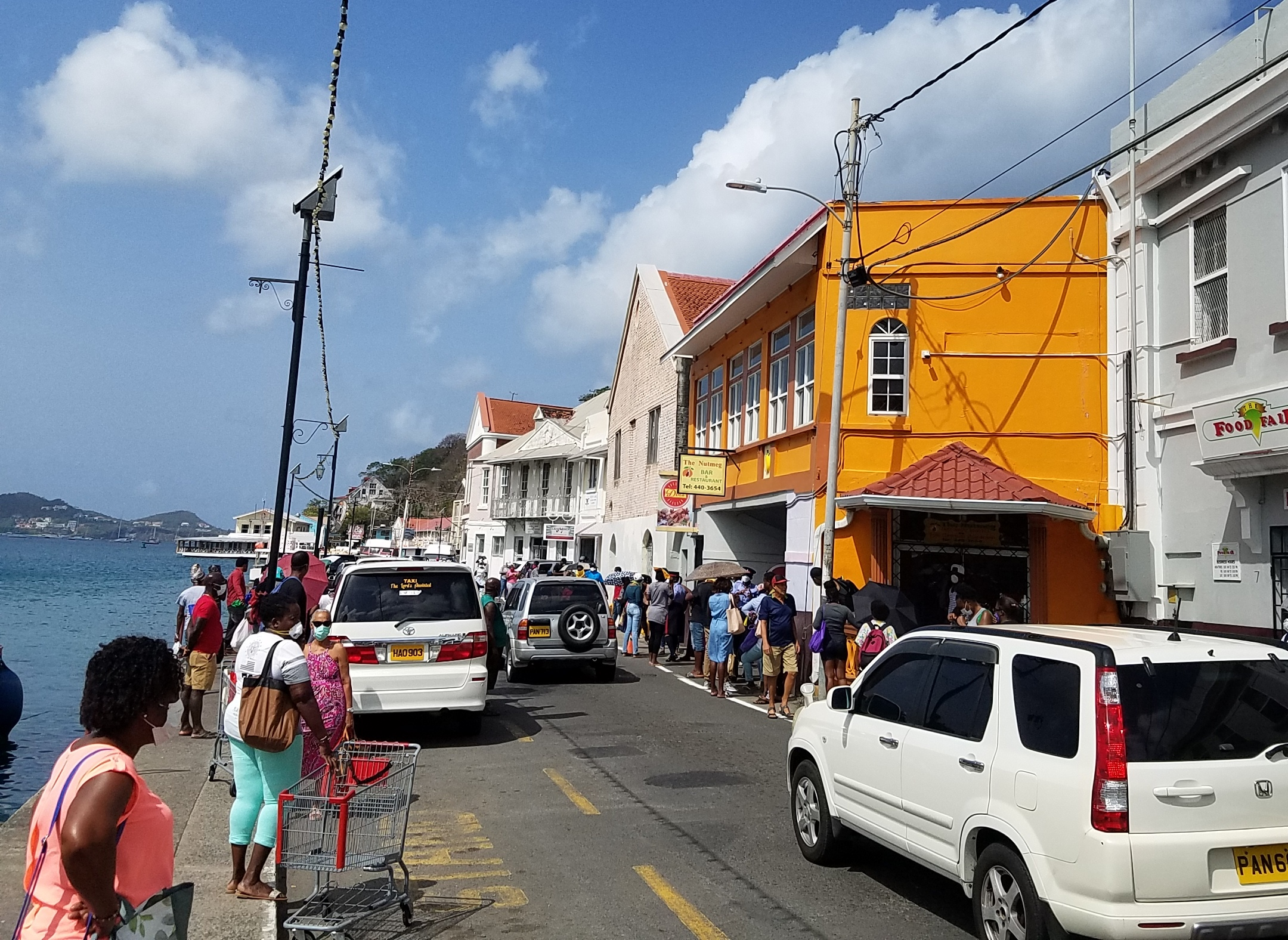
Shopping Lines in St. George's, Grenada during the COVID-19 pandemic

On March 25, emergency powers were implemented to restrict movement and nightly curfews. Businesses unable to enforce social distancing were ordered to be closed (e.g., many restaurants and bars became take-out only). These were quickly revised into a full, 24-hour lockdown on March 30, where all citizens were to remain in their homes and all business were closed except essential services described in the act. Specific grocery days were permitted under control of the RGPF, and various changes were experimented with how to effectively handle shopping days (e.g., surname days, times for senior citizens, etc.). The first 24-hour period was to last one week, but following continued exposure of new cases, it was expanded for two additional weeks (thru April 20), then another week (now with relaxed protocols), and again for a fifth week (thru May 5). (Note: It is worth mentioning that the word "curfew" has a heavy meaning for those that lived through the shoot-on-site curfew imposed at end of the Grenada Revolution.) On April 18, Emergency Powers were officially extended an additional six months, solely as a precaution should new cases arise (rather than have them expire every few weeks).

With no new cases in the first week of May, Prime Minister Keith Mitchell announced a relaxation of the 24-hour curfew rules, with pre-approved businesses (e.g., grocery stores, banks, etc.) allowed to open every day again, beginning May 11, albeit with continued maintenance of a curfew from 7pm to 5pm. Among other things, construction projects and landscaping could also restart, as could travel between the sister islands, although international borders would remain closed until early June. Nonetheless, the ban on public buses remained in effect, limiting access to those who owned private vehicles, and restaurants remained take-out only.

These easements continued into the week of May 25, with the reopening of retail stores and beautification shops (e.g., hair salons and barbers), as well as public ferry service between Grenada and Carriacou. No date was given for opening the airport, but Minister Steele ensured the public that a two-week notice would precipitate the airport opening and that it would not happen until at least a "three month supply" of rapid tests had been acquired on island (see Economic Effects below). Similarly, public buses were not yet allowed to recommence service, and negotiations with the bus association were frayed by government's refusal to allow a $0.50 price increase in return for the spatially-distanced, reduced passenger loads required (bus transport restarted on June 8 despite lack of agreement) (see Economic Effects below).

As cases continued to decline throughout June 2020, Emergency Powers were continued, but with incremental loosening. On June 16, the daily curfew was loosened from 5am to 9pm (previously from 6am to 7pm) and in-dining restaurants were allowed, so long as they were approved by the Ministry of Health beforehand. On June 28, the curfew was again relaxed to 5am-11pm, remaining so until September 2021, when community spread occurred.

=== Testing and tracing ===
As faster testing (e.g., antibody tests) became available through the help of St. George's University and Venezuela, the government became increasingly confidant in very low (if any) community spread. While the PM has mentioned June as an anticipated full internal opening (still keeping borders closed), the low spread of the disease has encouraged the RGPF to offer increasing exceptions to the lockdown rules. By April 18, government relayed their expectation to relax the 24-hour curfew period after April 27, since they had then tested 116 PCR and 82 "rapid" (antibody) tests, with no new cases discovered (although widespread testing will continue). Indeed, they also announced that 7 of the infected persons had now recovered.

However, this attitude of victory soon changed on April 20. At the start of the relaxed-curfew week (April 20–24), the RGPF made a morning press conference clarifying the businesses allowed to open and general protocols for the next week, which included opening parish boundaries for the first time in four weeks. Many people rightly treated this as the start of a reopening period. But at noon, Minister Nickolas Steele made an emergency announcement that a new patient (Case #15) had been admitted to the General Hospital on April 19, exhibiting symptoms of COVID-19 and tested positive for the rapid (antibody) test. After two days of waiting, the patient was confirmed positive via multiple PCR tests. Since the individual—as far as is known—had not traveled, nor been in contact with anyone who had traveled, nor been in contact with any positive cases, it appeared to be the first case of community spread, likely acquired from an undiagnosed, asymptomatic case. On April 25, the third such asymptomatic case was confirmed (like the others, considered "import-related"), along with two colleagues of Case #15. It was also announced that 175 PCR and 1000 rapid tests had been conducted to date (April 25), including 69 employees from the workplace of Case #15 and 57 tests in Carriacou and Petite Martinique. By April 29, it was announced that 1200 rapid tests and 206 PCR tests had been conducted, although the number of positive rapid tests was not released, as the official count is based solely on active cases confirmed via PCR.

By May 5, 2020, 309 PCR and 1472 Rapid tests had been conducted, which were then expanded for several rounds of testing of the factory in Tempe (related to Case #15). These tests came back negative, confirming that community spread (if it occurred at all) had now abated. On May 12, the Ministry of Health reported they had conducted 412 PCR tests and 2007 rapid tests in total. On May 15, upon announcing the 22nd positive case, Ministry of Health recorded 2459 rapid tests conducted and 454 PCR. By May 25, contact-tracing investigations into Case #15 were said to be closed, with no further individuals having tested positive. It remains unclear, however, whether Case #15 was indeed a case of community spread or someone at the factory had acquired the virus through interactions on the port. The entire crew of at least one cargo vessel with whom Case #15 interacted with was tracked down and tested, but all were negative.

== Regional cooperation ==
In instituting its response to the pandemic, the government of Grenada has worked in concert with PAHO, CARPHA, and regional governments. However, the closing of borders led to tension with St. Vincent's, where the government of Ralph Gonsalves was much more lax. On April 11, Gonsalves criticized Mitchell's treatment of Grenada's Grenadine Islands, stating "I want to say to the people of Carriacou & Petite Martinique that if you have difficulty in getting food, we can help"—to which Mitchell, when asked in a press briefing, called "grossly irresponsible." The spat was a reminder of the historical tensions regarding ownership of the Grenadine islands. (Note: All of the Grenadines had once been part of Grenada's political unit under both French and British colonial administrations. In 1783 (partly influenced by the temporary French re-capture of Grenada in 1779), the British decided to annex most of the Grenadines to St. Vincent's oversight (from Bequia to Union). After independence in 1979, the country included them in its official name, "St. Vincent and the Grenadines" (SVG). A referendum in 2016 that included (among many constitutional reforms) changing Grenada's official name to "Grenada, Carriacou, and Petite Martinique," failed despite the ruling party's total majority in parliament.) Following a deadly fire on May 19, 2020, at Union Island's only petrol station, Grenada announced efforts were underway to offer daily refueling assistance.

== Economic effects ==
=== General economy ===
As with the rest of the world, the COVID-19 pandemic wreaked havoc on Grenada's economy, least not the ripple effects of a collapsed tourism industry. On March 20, 2020, the government announced a stimulus package to provide income support to small businesses, suspension of various taxes, and unemployment benefits to eligible citizens, which took about a month to fully roll out. Seven sub-committees have also been set up to focus on the needs of tourism & citizen by investment, construction, education, small businesses, agriculture and fisheries, manufacturing, and e-commerce. To help meet the short-falls, Grenada a received rapid loan of US$22.4 million from the IMF, in a package aimed at the Eastern Caribbean countries of Dominica, Grenada, and St. Lucia, more than doubling the previous US$14.38 million Grenada owed to the lender. Another loan of $5.9 million was secured through the Caribbean Development Bank.

=== Airports ===
On March 22, Grenada's international airport and Carriacou's regional airport were closed to all commercial passenger traffic, and remained so through the 2020 summer. With the stoppage of passenger flights, courier mail services (such as the USPS and Royal Mail) were halted, with only private courier flights like Fed-Ex and DHL allowed. On May 29, it was announced that June 30 was the anticipated opening of the borders (and thus, airports), with the expectation that all incoming passengers would receive a temperature check, rapid antibody test, and would self-quarantine for 14 days after arrival. A mobile app will be employed to monitor symptoms and movements of individuals during their quarantine period. On June 26, Clarice Modeste-Curwen, Minister for Tourism and Civil Aviation, announced that the airports were prepared to reopen. However, in a speech to the nation two days later (June 28), Prime Minister Keith Mitchell stated international travel would likely not commence until early August, citing the resurgence of the virus in the United States (a major source country for Grenada's tourism) and the refusal of international airlines to require passenger testing prior to boarding.

=== Public transport ===
Public bus transport was allowed to recommence on June 1, but with reduced passenger loads (12 people max, including driver and conductor—later increased to 15). On June 10, 2020, the government claimed to have paid $360k in stimulus to bus drivers, equating $800/month per bus. The bus association has thanked government for this stimulus, but (noting the stimulus will end once bus operations restart) they requested a price increase of $0.50/passenger going forward to offset losses of enforced protocols, emergency power curfews, and suppressed passenger traffic in general. No agreement was reached, so buses restarted operation without further government support.

== Vaccination ==
Grenada received its first doses of the AstraZeneca vaccine in February 2021, but its vaccination rate remained low amongst other Caricom nations.

On 19 August 2021, the United States confirmed the delivery of 29,250 doses of the Pfizer–BioNTech vaccine to the Government of Grenada.

As of 2 September 2021, number of persons vaccinated (1st dose)- 26,088 and number of persons vaccinated (2nd dose)- 19,372.

As of 3 September 2021, number of persons vaccinated (1st dose)- 26,545 and number of persons vaccinated (2nd dose)- 19,450.

During the wave of new cases, vaccinations increased dramatically, with over 5000 first doses administered between August 18 and September 7.

On 19 November 2021, Argentina formalized its donation of 11,000 doses of the Oxford-AstraZeneca vaccine to Grenada, which amounts to about 10% of Grenada's target population for vaccination.

== See also ==
- Caribbean Public Health Agency
- COVID-19 pandemic in North America
- COVID-19 pandemic in South America
- COVID-19 pandemic in Barbados
- COVID-19 pandemic in Trinidad and Tobago
- COVID-19 pandemic by country and territory
