= Ministry of National Security (Grenada) =

Ministry of the government of Grenada

The Ministry of National Security (MONS), officially titled the Ministry of National Security, Public Administration, Home Affairs, Information & Communications Technology, is the interior ministry of the government of Grenada. Its headquarters are in St. George's, the capital city of Grenada.

As of 2021, the Minister for National Security, Public Administration, Home Affairs, Information & Communications Technology is Keith Mitchell, the Prime Minister of Grenada.
