= Royal Grenada Police Force =

Main law enforcement agency in Grenada

- Logo for the RGPF
- Abbreviation: RGPF
- Motto: To Protect and to Serve

Agency overview
- Formed: 1853

Jurisdictional structure
- National agency: Grenada
- Operations jurisdiction: Grenada
- Area: 348.5 square kilometres (134.6 mi^{2})
- Population: 124,610
- General nature: Civilian police

Operational structure
- Headquarters: New Police Headquarters, St. George's, Grenada
- Sworn members: 940 (out of 1025 permitted by statute)
- Agency executives: Randy Connaught*, Acting Commissioner of Police; Jessmon Prince, Deputy Commissioner of Police; Vannie Curwen, Assistant Commissioner of Police

Facilities
- Police stations: 14

Website
- Official website

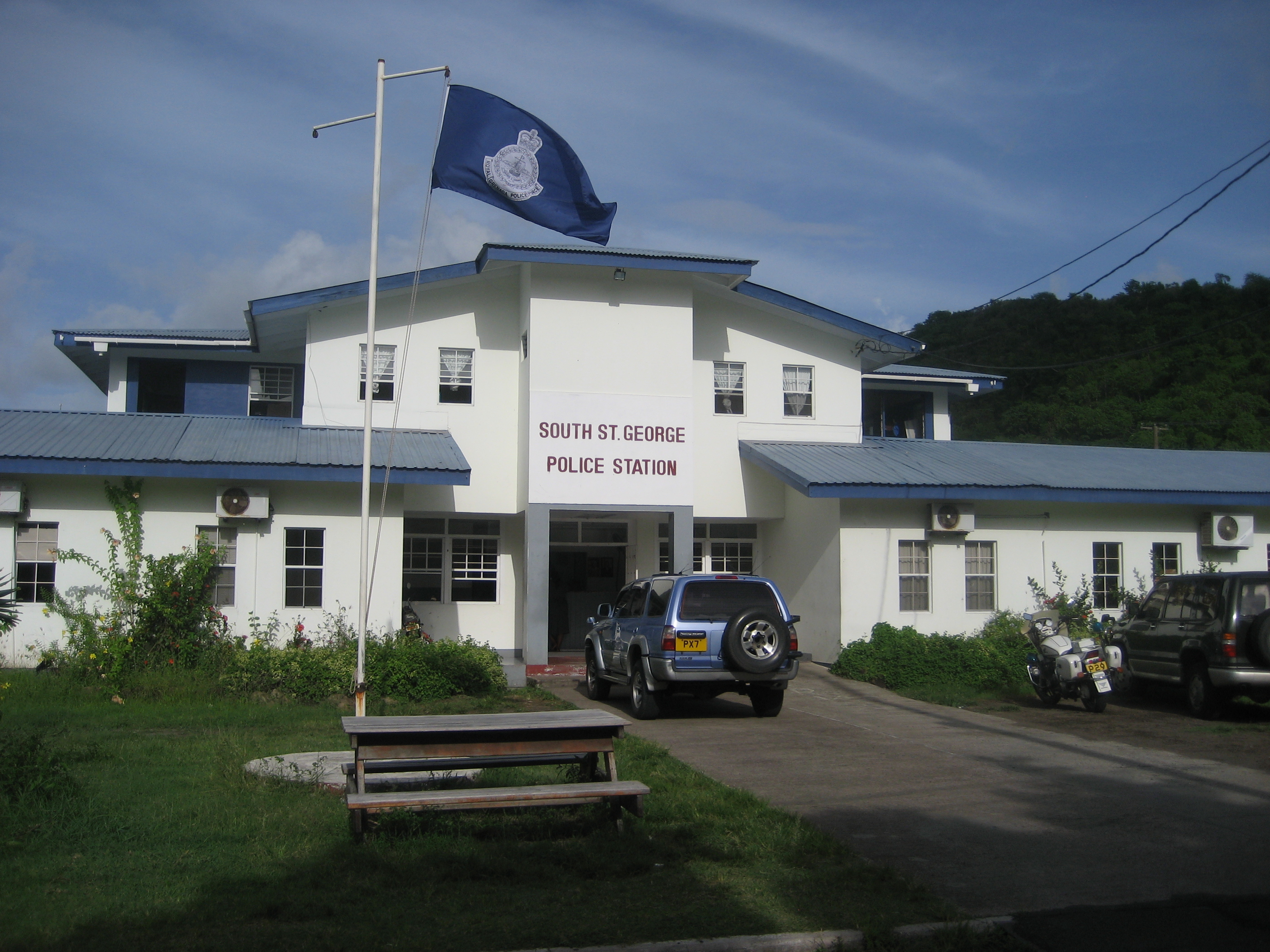
Royal Grenadian Police station, Grand Anse, St. George's, Grenada

The Royal Grenada Police Force (RGPF) is responsible for law enforcement in Grenada. The RGPF enforces criminal, immigration, and maritime laws. It is also held responsible for seaport security and fire services. With 14 police stations and over 940 staff members, the force responds to over 15,000 crimes and incidents per year. Its activities are mandated by the Police Act.

The Royal Grenada Police Force also has a paramilitary force, the Special Services Unit, for national defence as well as a maritime security wing, the Royal Grenada Coast Guard.

== History ==
The RGPF dates back to 1853 as simply the Grenada Police Force. In 1854, the RGPF was based at Fort George, Grenada and supported by the Colonial Government of Grenada. The force grew slowly and by 1923, the police force had 92 soldiers.

During the People's Revolutionary Government's brief revolutionary era in the early 80s, the RGPF was known as the Grenada Police Service. During this period, the police lost virtually all of its authority and was forced to delegate many of its powers with the newly formed People's Revolutionary Army. The GPS at the time was tasked with traffic and crime management. Its headquarters under the leadership of Prime Minister Maurice Bishop was moved from Fort George (renamed by that time to Fort Rupert) to Melville Street on 24 May 1979.

The name was reverted and the police headquarters returned to Fort George following in October 1983 following the military coup that was led by General Hudson Austin with the United States invasion of Grenada.

When the RGPF was retrained after the restoration of democracy in Grenada, its initial officers were former People's Revolutionary Army and People's Revolutionary Militia soldiers. US Special Forces operators stayed behind to assist in training alongside the United Kingdom, Jamaica and Barbados.

The RGPF is permitted up to 1,025 sworn members, however, currently only has 940 members. Approximately 14% of the force is female.

== Organisation ==
=== Departments ===
The RGPF is divided into 4 divisions, each headed by a Superintendent, which each has responsibility for a certain geographic area within the country.

The force consists of 18 distinct departments with different purposes. These departments include a fire department, the police headquarters, a prosecution department, immigration department, drug squad, police band, training academy, traffic and transport department, criminal records office, criminal investigation department, community relations department, port police department, information technology unit, and a special victims unit.

Additionally, there is a department dedicated to providing security for the workplace and residence of the Governor-General of Grenada and a Special Branch for diplomatic and other governmental security.

Between 1905–1907, the National Band of Grenada was established in the RGPF as a drum and bugle corps. It was then called the Government Band, which comprised volunteers including tradesmen. On 1 August 1967, the band was renamed RGPF band having Mr. Switch De Couteau as its first Inspector of Police as bandmaster.

The Royal Grenada Coast Guard forms the marine arm of the police force. It is responsible for patrolling and protecting Grenada’s territorial waters, conducting drug interdiction missions, and ocean rescue operations.

The Special Services Unit is the force's paramilitary arm for national defence and high profile cases. The SSU was formed in the aftermath of the US invasion of Grenada in 1983 to replace the People's Revolutionary Army as Grenada's military force.

=== Education ===
Prior to 1984, officers recruited into the force were trained at the Regional Police Training Centre in Barbados.

=== Commissioners ===
- Stephen Bascombe (1969-1970)
- R. King (1970-1971)
- Rugent David (1971)
- R.L. Barrow (1971-1973)
- Nugent David (1973-1974)
- Osbert James (1974-1975)
- J. Usen (1975-1976)
- Osbert James (1976)
- Adonis Francis (1976)
- Osbert James (1976-1978)
- Anthony Bernard (1978)
- Osbert James (1978-1979)
- Raphael Stanislaus (1979)
- James Clarkson (1979-1981)
- A. B. Bernar (1981)
- Major Ian St. Bernard (1981)
- Major Patrick McLeish (1981-1983)
- Fitzroy Bedeau (1995-2005)
- Winston James (2015-2018)
- Edvin Martin (2018-2022)
- Don McKenzie (2022-Present)

=== Ranks ===
The following ranks are used in the RGPF:

- Commissioner of Police
- Deputy Commissioner of Police
- Assistant Commissioner of Police
- Superintendent of Police
- Assistant Superintendent of Police
- Inspector
- Cadet Officer
- Police Sergeant
- Police Corporal
- Police Constable

== See also ==
- Mongoose Gang, a quasi-independent branch which operated from 1967 to 1979 under the control of Sir Eric Gairy.

== Bibliography ==
- Badri-Maharaj, Sanjay (2022). Urgent Fury: Grenada 1983. Helion & Company. ISBN 978-1915070739.
