= New Parliament Building, Grenada =

Home of the Parliament of Grenada

Coordinates: 12.05384°N 61.74536°W

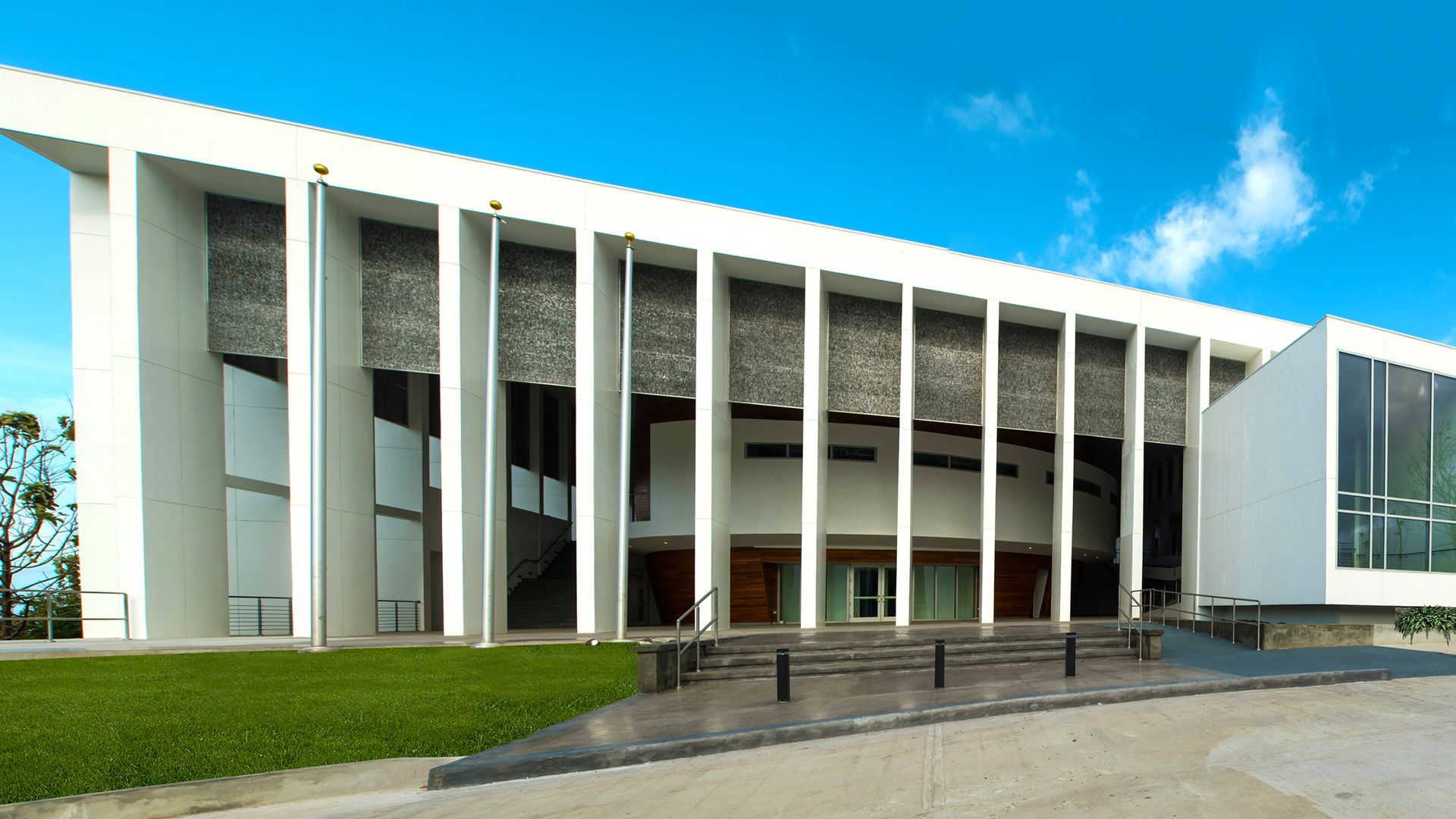
Outside of the House

The New Parliament Building in St. George's, Grenada, is the home of the Parliament of Grenada. It was built to replace York House, the previous Parliament building, which was destroyed by Hurricane Ivan in 2004. The new building is situated on Mount Wheldale, overlooking the city of St. George's and its bay.

The new building cost U.S.$ 12.2m, including funding provided by Mexico and the United Arab Emirates, and was designed by the Grenadian company COCOA Architecture. The building was officially opened in June 2018.
