= Eva Sylvester =

Grenadian politician

Member of the Legislative Council
- In office 1952–1954
- Preceded by: Cyril Sylvester
- Succeeded by: Frederick B. Paterson
- Constituency: Carriacou and Petite Martinique

Personal details
- Born: Petite Martinique, Grenada

Eva Mary Louisa Ollivierre-Sylvester JP was a Grenadian politician. She was elected to the Legislative Council in 1952, becoming its first female member.

== Biography ==
Eva Mary Louisa Ollivierre was born in Petite Martinique and attended St Joseph's Convent school. In 1921 she married Cyril Sylvester, with whom she had twelve children. Cyril was elected to the Legislative Council from the Carriacou and Petite Martinique constituency in 1951, but died the following year. Eva was nominated as a candidate for the Grenada United Labour Party and won the resulting by-election, becoming the first woman to sit in the Legislative Council. She ran for re-election in 1954, but lost to Frederick B. Paterson. In 1972 she was appointed as a justice of the peace.

Her granddaughter Cécile La Grenade later served as Governor-General.
