= 1961 Grenadian general election =

General elections in Grenada held on 27 March 1961

- 27 March 1961

All 10 seats in the Legislative Council 6 seats needed for a majority
- Registered: 41,082
- Turnout: 55.49% (▼12.91pp)
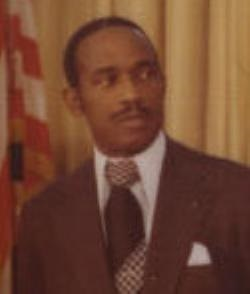

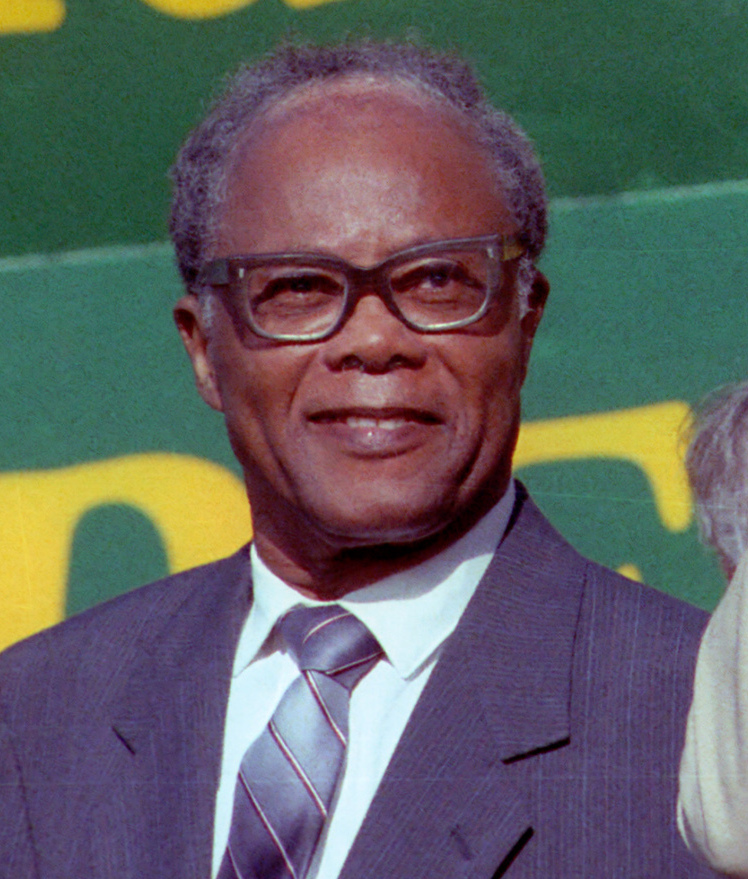
	First party	Second party
Leader	Eric Gairy	Herbert Blaize
Party	GULP	GNP
Last election	44.37%, 2 seats	24.36%, 2 seats
Seats won	8	2
Seat change	▲6	Steady
Popular vote	11,606	5,802
Percentage	53.35%	26.67%
Swing	▲8.98pp	▲2.31pp
- Results by constituency
Chief Minister before election
Herbert Blaize
GNP
Elected Chief Minister
George E. D. Clyne
GULP

General elections were held in Grenada on 27 March 1961. Eric Gairy's Grenada United Labour Party won eight of the ten seats, his wife Cynthia Gairy becoming the first woman to be elected to the legislature. George E.D. Clyne of GULP became Chief Minister and served from March to August 1961 when, following the direct intervention of the British government, Gairy's political ban was lifted early, and Clyne resigned allowing Gairy to return in a by-election and become Chief Minister. Voter turnout was 55.5%.

== Background ==
Following the introduction of the new Constitution on 21 December 1959 real authority for governing the country was given to a Chief Minister and those from the majority party in the Legislative Council. Herbert Blaize was appointed the first Chief Minister from 1 January 1960 when the Legislative Council provisions took effect. The Constitution stipulated that at the next election the Legislature would consist of ten elected members and two nominated members. The Queen was represented by an Administrator with reduced powers. Grenada's Administrator at this time was James Lloyd, a Jamaican.

Gairy, the leader of GULP, had been banned from political activity for five years for disrupting an opponent's political meeting on 28 October 1957, by leading a steel band through it. He was not eligible to be a candidate in 1961. Administrator James Lloyd would not raise the ban early.

== Results ==
Party	Votes	%	Seats	+/–
Grenada United Labour Party	11,606	53.35	8	+6
Grenada National Party	5,802	26.67	2	0
People's Democratic Movement	3,371	15.50	0	–2
Independents	975	4.48	0	–2
Total	21,754	100.00	10	+2
Valid votes	21,754	95.43		
Invalid/blank votes	1,041	4.57		
Total votes	22,795	100.00		
Registered voters/turnout	41,082	55.49		
Source: Caribbean Elections
