= 1962 Grenadian general election =

- 13 September 1962

10 of the 13 seats in the Legislative Council 6 seats needed for a majority
- Registered: 31,766
- Turnout: 72.59% (▲17.10pp)
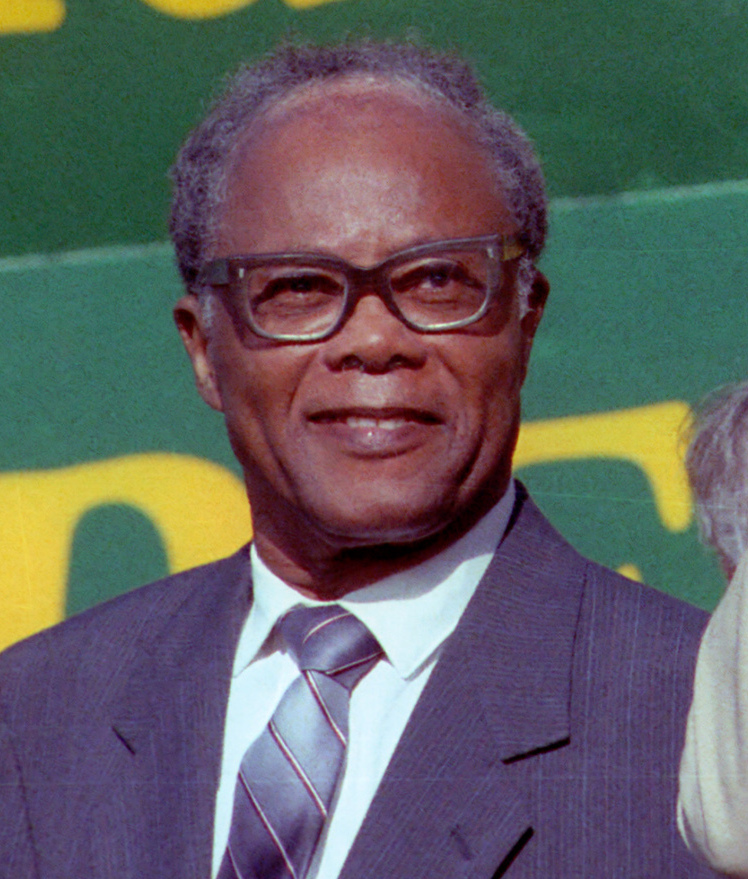

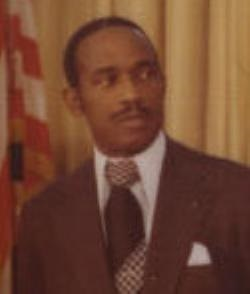
	First party	Second party
Leader	Herbert Blaize	Eric Gairy
Party	GNP	GULP
Last election	26.67%, 2 seats	53.35%, 8 seats
Seats won	6	4
Seat change	▲4	▼4
Popular vote	11,341	9,705
Percentage	53.73%	45.98%
Swing	▲27.06pp	▼7.37pp
- Results by constituency
Chief Minister before election
James Lloyd
(Administrator)
Elected Chief Minister
Herbert Blaize
GNP

General elections were held in Grenada on 13 September 1962. Herbert Blaize's Grenada National Party won six of the ten elected seats and Blaize was appointed Chief Minister for the second time. Blaize served as Head of Government until the next general election in August 1967, initially as Chief Minister until March 1967, and subsequently when Grenada became a fully internally autonomous Associated State, as Grenada's first Premier. Voter turnout was 73%.

== Background ==
Grenada's Administrator, the Queens representative on the island, James Lloyd suspended the constitution, dissolved the Legislative Council, and removed Eric Gairy as Chief Minister in April 1962 following allegations concerning the Gairy's financial impropriety. Gairy had been Chief Minister for 10 months since August 1961 and his party the Grenada United Labour Party held a majority in the Legislative Council following the 1961 elections. The negative publicity surrounding the removal of Gairy led to a significant fall in support for GULP.

== Campaign ==
The GNP campaigned in favour of a "political and economic alliance" with the newly independent state of Trinidad and Tobago, with Blaize proposing that Grenada enjoy a similar constitutional status to the island of Tobago, with proportional representation in the Legislative Council of Trinidad and Tobago and possibly guaranteed cabinet representation. Gairy instead supported the federation of the "Little Eight" group of British colonies in the Lesser Antilles, to replace the West Indies Federation which had dissolved earlier in 1962.

== Electoral system ==
The Legislative Council consisted of ten elected members, the principal law officer (ex officio) and two nominated members.

== Results ==
Party	Votes	%	Seats	+/–
Grenada National Party	11,341	53.73	6	+4
Grenada United Labour Party	9,705	45.98	4	–4
Independents	61	0.29	0	0
Total	21,107	100.00	10	0
Valid votes	21,107	91.53		
Invalid/blank votes	1,953	8.47		
Total votes	23,060	100.00		
Registered voters/turnout	31,766	72.59		
Source: Nohlen
