= Mongoose Gang =

1967 to 1979 Grenada paramilitary group

The Mongoose Gang was a private army or militia which operated from 1967 to 1979 under the control of Sir Eric Gairy, the Premier and later Prime Minister of Grenada, and head of the Grenada United Labour Party. Officially, Mongoose Gang members were called Special Reserve Police (S.R.P.) or Volunteer Constables.

A news report from 1974 states that the "Mongoose squad" sometimes carried rifles, but generally carried "thick pieces of wood". Mongoose Gang members also tended not to dress in any distinctive way.

The Mongoose Gang was responsible for silencing critics, breaking up demonstrations and murdering opponents of the Gairy regime, including Rupert Bishop, the father of Maurice Bishop, in January 1974. Maurice Bishop himself was beaten by members of the Mongoose Gang two months previously, in November 1973, and jailed. The violence of the Mongoose Gang and the Grenadian police became a more important factor than the state of the economy in generating unrest. MI5 intelligence reports at the time referred to the gang as being "ruthless", and "an un-uniformed and undisciplined body ... many of them have criminal records".

In November 1974, 10 months after Grenada's independence from Great Britain, Bishop's New JEWEL Movement issued a People's Indictment calling for "power to the people" and declaring that "the Gairy Government was born in blood, baptized in fire, christened with bullets, is married to foreigners, and is resulting in death to the people".

In the 1976 Grenadian general election, the Grenada United Labour Party won nine of the 15 seats, whilst the opposition People's Alliance (a coalition of the New JEWEL Movement, the Grenada National Party and the United People's Party) won the remainder. However, the elections were marred by fraud (and branded fraudulent by international observers), as the Mongoose Gang had been threatening the opposition.

The Mongoose Gang was used against protesters during the 1977 General Assembly of the Organization of American States hosted by Grenada.

In 1979, a rumour circulated that Gairy would use the gang to eliminate leaders of the New JEWEL Movement while he was out of the country. In response, Bishop overthrew Gairy in March of that year while the latter was visiting the United States. The Mongoose Gang then ceased to operate; the Gang's leader, Mosyln Bishop, a taxi driver, was subsequently sentenced later that year to fourteen years in prison for attempting to murder three people in November 1973.

The name 'Mongoose Gang' originated in the 1950s, when the local health officials sought to eliminate the mongoose as a pest, and paid people who brought in mongoose tails as proof of killing the animals. The men who were employed in such work became known as the 'mongoose-gang'. Later, the name shifted to refer to gangs of political thugs on Grenada. In fact, it was Gairy himself who got jobs for a number of men and women on the mongoose-eradication project in the 1950s when he was a representative of the Colony of Grenada's Legislative Council. For Gairy's part, in a 1984 interview with New York magazine, he denied employing thugs or any kind of secret police.

The Mongoose Gang has often been compared to the Tonton Macoute of Haiti.
