= 1972 Grenadian general election =

General elections in Grenada held on 28 February 1972

- 28 February 1972

All 15 seats in the House of Representatives 8 seats needed for a majority
- Registered: 41,538
- Turnout: 83.49% (▲6.37pp)
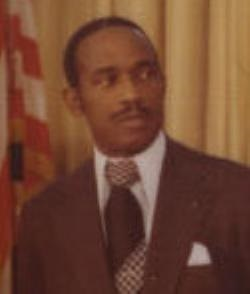

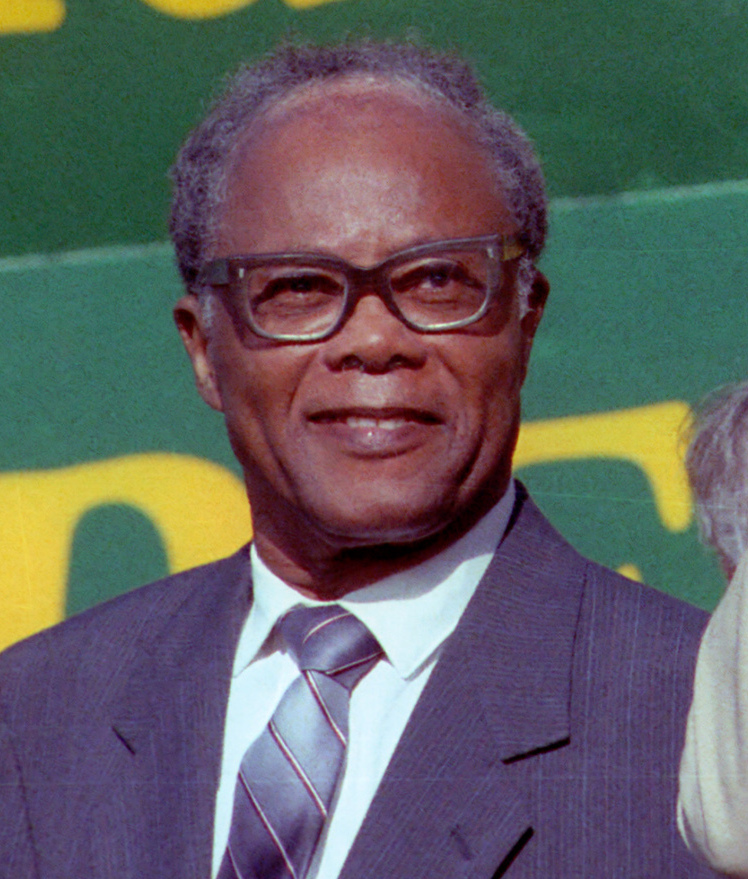
	First party	Second party
Leader	Eric Gairy	Herbert Blaize
Party	GULP	GNP
Last election	54.59%, 7 seats	45.41%, 3 seats
Seats won	13	2
Seat change	▲6	▼1
Popular vote	20,158	14,086
Percentage	58.87%	41.13%
Swing	▲4.28pp	▼4.28pp
- Results by constituency
Premier before election
Eric Gairy
GULP
Elected Premier
Eric Gairy
GULP

General elections were held in Grenada on 28 February 1972. The result was a victory for the Grenada United Labour Party, which won 13 of the 15 seats. Voter turnout was 83.5%.

== Results ==
Party	Votes	%	Seats	+/–
Grenada United Labour Party	20,158	58.87	13	+6
Grenada National Party	14,086	41.13	2	–1
Total	34,244	100.00	15	+5
Valid votes	34,244	98.75		
Invalid/blank votes	435	1.25		
Total votes	34,679	100.00		
Registered voters/turnout	41,538	83.49		
Source: Caribbean Elections
