= Gloria Payne-Banfield =

Grenadian politician and diplomat

Dame Gloria Payne-Banfield

Permanent Representative of Grenada to the United Nations

Member of the Senate of Grenada
- In office October 2003 – November 2003

Personal details
- Party: Grenada United Labour Party
- Awards: Dame Commander of the Order of the Nation (DCNG)

Dame Gloria Payne-Banfield, DCNG is a Grenada politician and diplomat who served as Grenada's Permanent Representative to the United Nations in the 1980s. She was Minister Counselor for the Grenada Mission in New York and Washington and currently serves as the President of Grenada National Organization of Women (GNOW) Inc. She was leader of the Grenada United Labour Party (GULP) and ran for an election on the ticket of the party in 2003.

== Career ==
Payne-Banfield served in the government of Sir Eric Gairy as chair of the Public Service Commission and Secretary to Cabinet in the government of Sir Nicholas Brathwaite. She was President of the Grenada Netball Association of Extended Care through Hope and Optimism (ECHO) and President of Soroptimist International of Grenada. She was an appointed member of the Senate of Grenada from October to November 2003.

== Honours ==
Payne-Banfield was knighted in 2025 to mark Grenada’s 51st anniversary of independence, being made a Dame Commander of the Order of the Nation.
