= 1957 Grenadian general election =

General elections in Grenada held on 24 September 1957

General elections were held in Grenada on 24 September 1957. Following the introduction of the new Constitution on 21 December 1959 real authority for governing the country was given to a Chief Minister and those from the majority party in the Legislative Council based on the 1957 elections. Herbert Blaize was appointed the first Chief Minister from 1 January 1960 when the Legislative Council provisions took effect, with the cooperation of the independents who chose to support the Grenada National Party.

== Background ==
This was the third election in Grenada's history held on the basis of universal adult suffrage. It was the first to have several competing political parties and for the first time Eric Gairy's Grenada United Labour Party had competition from other political parties, including the Grenada National Party led by John Watts and Herbert Blaize.

== Results ==
Party	Votes	%	Seats	+/–
Grenada United Labour Party	10,952	44.37	2	–4
Grenada National Party	6,012	24.36	2	New
People's Democratic Movement	5,327	21.58	2	New
West Indian Federal Labour Party	246	1.00	0	New
Independents	2,145	8.69	2	0
Total	24,682	100.00	8	0
Valid votes	24,682	95.63		
Invalid/blank votes	1,129	4.37		
Total votes	25,811	100.00		
Registered voters/turnout	37,738	68.40		
Source: Caribbean Elections
