= 1954 Grenadian general election =

General elections in Grenada held on 20 September 1954

General elections were held in Grenada on 20 September 1954. Although independent candidates received the most votes, Eric Gairy's Grenada United Labour Party (the only political party in existence at the time) won six of the eight seats, as it had done in the 1951 elections. At this time the Legislative Council had few powers. The role of head of government remained with the Administrator.

== Results ==
Party	Votes	%	Seats	+/–
Grenada United Labour Party	10,937	48.66	6	0
Independents	11,539	51.34	2	+2
Total	22,476	100.00	8	0
Valid votes	22,476	90.52		
Invalid/blank votes	2,353	9.48		
Total votes	24,829	100.00		
Registered voters/turnout	36,846	67.39		
Source: Caribbean Elections
