= 1999 Grenadian general election =

- 18 January 1999

All 15 seats in the House of Representatives 8 seats needed for a majority
- Registered: 73,673
- Turnout: 56.54% (▼5.20pp)
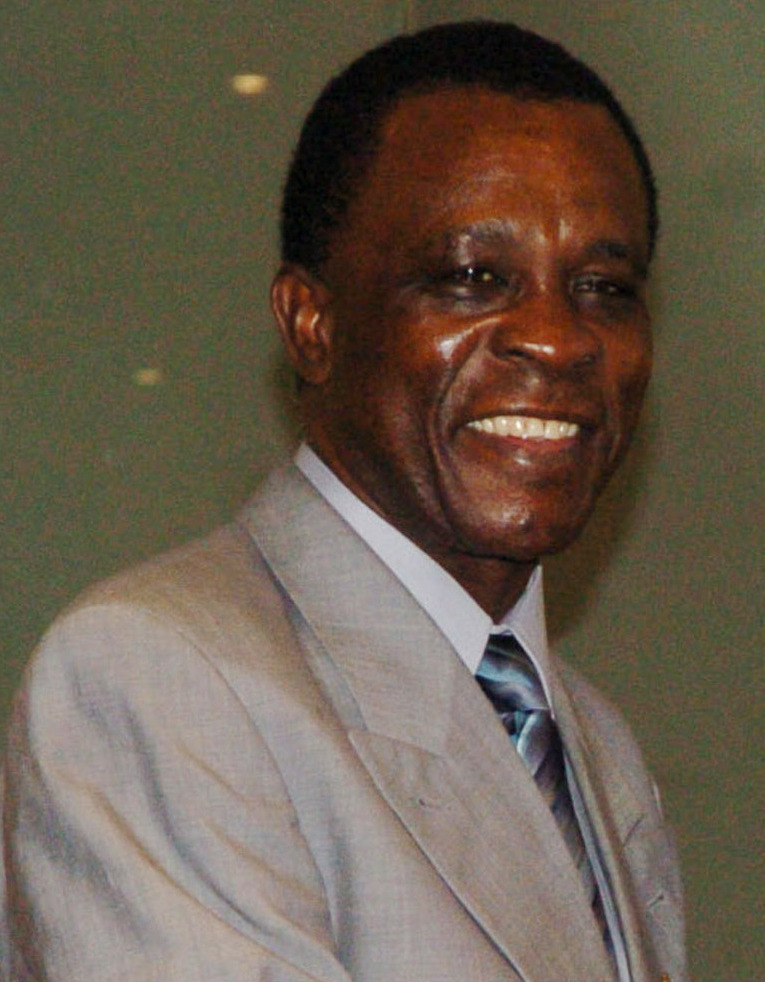

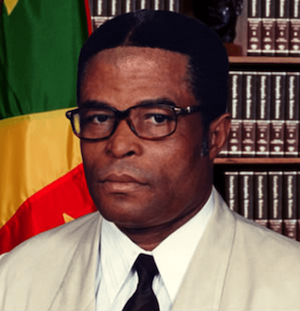
	First party	Second party
Leader	Keith Mitchell	George Brizan
Party	NNP	NDC
Last election	32.37%, 8 seats	30.59%, 5 seats
Seats won	15	0
Seat change	▲7	▼5
Popular vote	25,896	10,396
Percentage	62.47%	25.08%
Swing	▲30.10pp	▼5.51pp
- Winning party by constituency
Prime Minister before election
Keith Mitchell
NNP
Elected Prime Minister
Keith Mitchell
NNP

General elections were held in Grenada on 18 January 1999. The governing New National Party of Prime Minister Keith Mitchell was re-elected after winning all 15 seats. Voter turnout was 56.5%.

== Background ==
The last election in 1995 saw the then-governing National Democratic Congress defeated by the New National Party, which won 8 of the 15 seats. However, the New National Party lost their majority in late 1998, after the Foreign Minister Raphael Fletcher and minister Grace Duncan quit the party accusing the government of corruption. As a result, Parliament was dissolved 18 months before the end of its term on 2 December 1998, and on 14 December the election date of 18 January was announced.

48 candidates stood in the election, including 2 independents, for the 15 seats which were elected by first-past-the-post. Candidates included a full 15 candidates from the New National Party, 12 from the National Democratic Congress and 9 from the Grenada United Labour Party.

== Campaign ==
The governing New National Party of Prime Minister Keith Mitchell campaigned on pledges to preserve stability and bring about economic growth. Mitchell said that his government would create jobs by increased spending on infrastructure and by attracting foreign investment.

Meanwhile, the opposition, comprising a loose alliance between the National Democratic Congress and the Grenada United Labour Party, attacked the government for corruption. They alleged that there had been issues with the awarding of contracts and that the Prime Minister had been involved with foreign investors with shady backgrounds. The opposition also said the government was not doing enough for health care, and they in particular attacked a decision to build a stadium instead of a hospital. However, the opposition suffered divisions, with disagreement between the two opposition parties over who should become Prime Minister if they won the election.

== Results ==
The results saw the governing New National Party re-elected after winning all 15 seats contested. Among the victorious candidates for the governing party was the Prime Minister Keith Mitchell, who won his own seat of St George's Northwest with 89% of the vote. This was only the second time since independence a government had been re-elected in Grenada, and the first since 1976.

The government's record in attracting investment and increasing economic growth was seen as having gained support for the New National Party, while the opposition said that the six-week campaign had been too short for them to prepare for the election. Election monitors from the Organisation of American States observed the election and said that it had been "free and fair".

Party	Votes	%	Seats	+/–
New National Party	25,896	62.47	15	+7
National Democratic Congress	10,396	25.08	0	–5
GULP–United Labour	4,853	11.71	0	–2
Maurice Bishop Patriotic Movement	260	0.63	0	0
Good Old Democratic Party	12	0.03	0	0
Independents	38	0.09	0	0
Total	41,455	100.00	15	0
Valid votes	41,455	99.51		
Invalid/blank votes	203	0.49		
Total votes	41,658	100.00		
Registered voters/turnout	73,673	56.54		
Source: Nohlen
