= Sir Eric Matthew Gairy Botanical Gardens =

Botanical garden in St. George's, Grenada

Coordinates: 12.0469°N 61.7445°W

The Sir Eric Matthew Gairy Botanical Gardens is a botanical garden in St. George's, the capital city of Grenada. It is the home of the main ministerial complex of the government of Grenada.

It is named for Eric Gairy, Grenada's independence leader and first Prime Minister.
