= 1967 Grenadian general election =

General elections in Grenada held on 24 August 1967

- 24 August 1967

All 10 seats in the House of Representatives 6 seats needed for a majority
- Registered: 38,880
- Turnout: 77.12% (▲4.53pp)
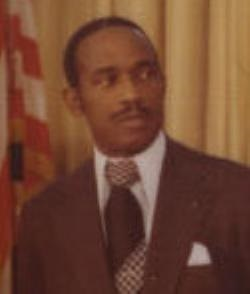

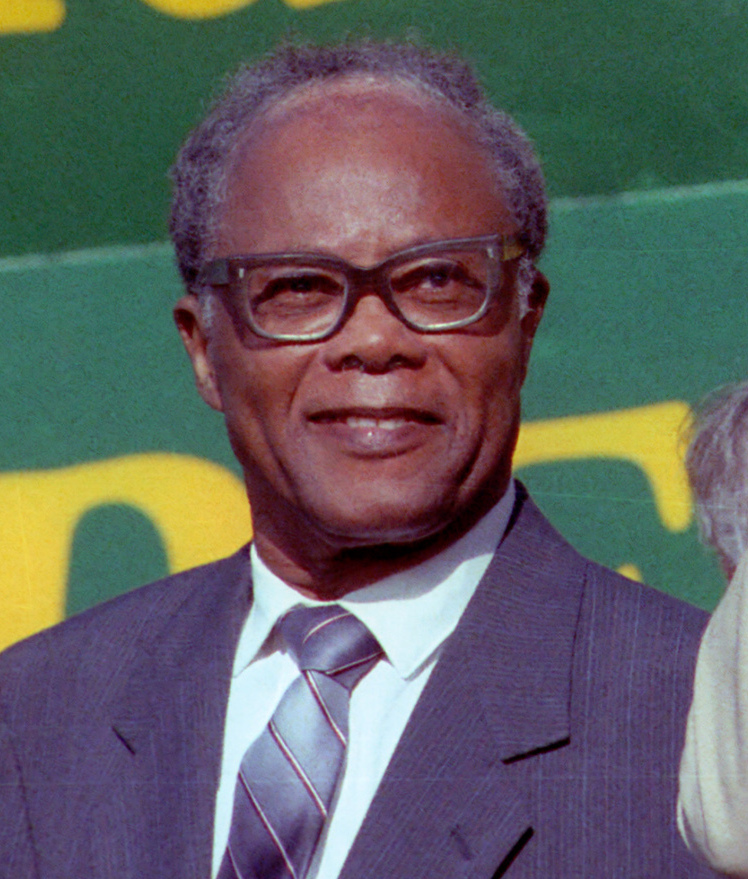
	First party	Second party
Leader	Eric Gairy	Herbert Blaize
Party	GULP	GNP
Last election	45.98%, 4 seats	53.73%, 6 seats
Seats won	7	3
Seat change	▲3	▼3
Popular vote	15,827	13,172
Percentage	54.58%	45.42%
Swing	▲8.60pp	▼8.31pp
- Results by constituency
Premier before election
Herbert Blaize
GNP
Elected Premier
Eric Gairy
GULP

General elections were held in Grenada on 24 August 1967. The result was a victory for the Grenada United Labour Party, which won seven of the ten seats. Voter turnout was 77.1%.

== Results ==
Party	Votes	%	Seats	+/–
Grenada United Labour Party	15,827	54.58	7	+3
Grenada National Party	13,172	45.42	3	–3
Total	28,999	100.00	10	0
Valid votes	28,999	96.71		
Invalid/blank votes	985	3.29		
Total votes	29,984	100.00		
Registered voters/turnout	38,880	77.12		
Source: Nohlen
