= List of heads of government of Grenada =

Prime Minister of Grenada
- Coat of arms of Grenada

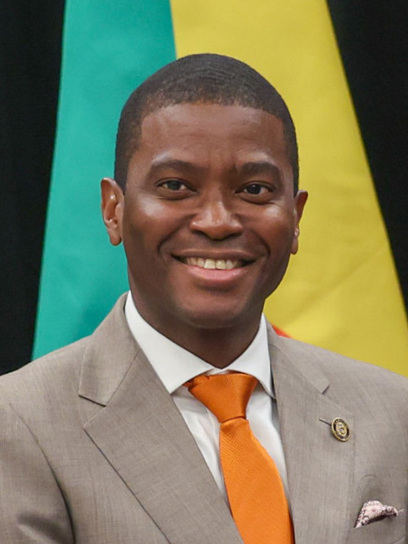
- Incumbent; Dickon Mitchell since 24 June 2022
- Style: The Honourable
- Appointer: Governor-General
- Term length: At His Majesty's pleasure
- Precursor: Premier of Grenada
- Inaugural holder: Eric Gairy
- Formation: 7 February 1974; 52 years ago
- Deputy: Deputy Prime Minister of Grenada
- Salary: EC$80,619 / US$29,859 annually
- Website: www.gov.gd

This is a list of heads of government of Grenada, from the establishment of the office of the chief minister in 1960 to the present day.

== List of officeholders ==
Political parties

Grenada National Party (GNP)
Grenada United Labour Party (GULP)
New JEWEL Movement (NJM)
New National Party (NNP)
The National Party (TNP)
National Democratic Congress (NDC)

Other affiliations

Independent

Symbols

^{†} Died in office

=== Chief ministers of Grenada (1960–1967) ===
No.	Portrait	Name (Birth–Death)	Election	Term of office			Political party
No.	Portrait	Name (Birth–Death)	Election	Took office	Left office	Time in office	Political party
1		Herbert Blaize (1918–1989)	1957	January 1960	March 1961	1 year, 2 months	GNP
2		George E. D. Clyne (?–1984)	1961	March 1961	August 1961	5 months	GULP
3		Eric Gairy (1922–1997)	—	August 1961	19 June 1962	10 months	GULP
(1)		Herbert Blaize (1918–1989)	1962	September 1962	March 1967	4 years, 6 months	GNP

=== Premiers of the Associated State of Grenada (1967–1974) ===
No.	Portrait	Name (Birth–Death)	Election	Term of office			Political party
No.	Portrait	Name (Birth–Death)	Election	Took office	Left office	Time in office	Political party
1		Herbert Blaize (1918–1989)	—	March 1967	August 1967	5 months	GNP
2		Sir Eric Gairy (1922–1997)	1967; 1972	August 1967	6 February 1974	6 years, 6 months	GULP

=== Prime Minister of Grenada (1974–present) ===
No.	Portrait	Name (Birth–Death)	Election	Term of office			Political party
No.	Portrait	Name (Birth–Death)	Election	Took office	Left office	Time in office	Political party
Prime Minister of Grenada (1974–1979)
1		Sir Eric Gairy (1922–1997)	1976	7 February 1974	13 March 1979 (Deposed in a coup)	5 years, 34 days	GULP
Prime ministers of the People's Revolutionary Government of Grenada (1979–1983)
2		Maurice Bishop (1944–1983)	—	13 March 1979	14 October 1983 (Deposed in a coup)	4 years, 215 days	NJM
—		Bernard Coard (born 1944)	—	14 October 1983	19 October 1983 (Deposed in a coup)	5 days	NJM
Head of the Revolutionary Military Council of Grenada (1983)
—		General Hudson Austin (1938–2022)	—	19 October 1983	30 October 1983 (Deposed by US invasion)	11 days	Military / NJM
Governor-General of Grenada (1983)
—		Sir Paul Scoon (1935–2013)	—	31 October 1983	9 December 1983	39 days	None
Chairman of the Interim Advisory Council (1983–1984) (Note: Scoon became interim head of government and appointed an advisory council, which in turn named Nicholas Brathwaite as chairman and interim prime minister.)
3		Nicholas Brathwaite (1925–2016)	—	9 December 1983	4 December 1984	361 days	Independent
Prime ministers of Grenada (1984–present)
4		Herbert Blaize (1918–1989)	1984	4 December 1984	19 December 1989^{[†]}	5 years, 15 days	NNP
		Herbert Blaize (1918–1989)	1984	4 December 1984	19 December 1989^{[†]}	5 years, 15 days	TNP
5		Ben Jones (1924–2005)	—	20 December 1989	16 March 1990	86 days	TNP
(3)		Nicholas Brathwaite (1925–2016)	1990	16 March 1990	1 February 1995	4 years, 322 days	NDC
6		George Brizan (1942–2012)	—	1 February 1995	22 June 1995	141 days	NDC
7		Keith Mitchell (born 1946)	1995; 1999; 2003	22 June 1995	9 July 2008	13 years, 17 days	NNP
8		Tillman Thomas (born 1947)	2008	9 July 2008	20 February 2013	4 years, 226 days	NDC
(7)		Keith Mitchell (born 1946)	2013; 2018	20 February 2013	24 June 2022	9 years, 124 days	NNP
9		Dickon Mitchell (born 1978)	2022; 2026	24 June 2022	Incumbent	4 years, 149 days	NDC

== Timeline ==
This is a graphical lifespan timeline of the prime ministers of Grenada. They are listed in order of first assuming office.

The following chart lists prime ministers by lifespan (living prime ministers on the green line), with the years outside of their tenure in beige.

== See also ==
- Prime Ministers of Queen Elizabeth II
- Prime Ministers of King Charles III
- List of Commonwealth Heads of Government
- Politics of Grenada
- Prime Minister of the West Indies Federation
- Governor-General of Grenada
- List of heads of state of Grenada
- List of Privy Counsellors (1952–2022)
- Leader of the Opposition (Grenada)
