= George E. D. Clyne =

Grenadian politician

George Elliot Dunbar Clyne was Chief Minister of Grenada from March 1961 to August 1961. He became the chief minister following GULP election victory and stepped down when the political ban of Eric Gairy was lifted.

Clyne was a lawyer by profession. He was Speaker of the House of Representatives of Grenada from 1967 to 1973. He retired from politics in 1974 and died in November 1984.

== See also ==
- List of heads of government of Grenada

Political offices
Preceded by Herbert Blaize	Chief Minister of Grenada; March 1961 – August 1961	Succeeded by Eric Gairy
Preceded by Herbert Blaize	Minister of Finance of Grenada; 1961	Succeeded by Eric Gairy
