= United Republican Party =

The United Republican Party may refer to:

- United Republican Party (Grenada)
- United Republican Party (Guyana)
- United Republican Party (Kenya)
