= West Indian Federal Labour Party =

Defunct Grenadian political party

The West Indian Federal Labour Party was a political party in Grenada. It contested the 1957 general elections, but received only 246 votes and failed to win a seat. It did not run in any further elections.
