= Cynthia Gairy =

Grenadan politician

- Born: March 25, 1923; Saint David Parish
- Died: January 29, 2018 (aged 94)
- Occupation: Politician
- Spouse(s): Eric Gairy

Cynthia Gairy (née Clyne; 25 March 1923 – 29 January 2018) was a Grenadan politician. She was the first woman to serve in the Parliament of Grenada and the Cabinet of Grenada. She was the wife of the first Prime Minister of Grenada, Eric Gairy.

Cynthia Gairy was born on 25 March 1923 in Saint David Parish, Grenada, the daughter of Francis Clyne and Felicity Francis Clyne. She married Eric Gairy in 1949 and they had two daughters.

In 1961, Gairy became the first woman elected to the legislature in Grenada. In 1972, her husband appointed her to his cabinet as Minister of Minister of Social Affairs, Community Development, and Cooperatives. After the 1979 coup ousting Eric Gairy, Cynthia Gairy was one of the government officials who publicly urged cooperation with the new government.

Cynthia Gairy died on 29 January 2018 in the United States.
