= Herbert Preudhomme =

Deputy Prime Minister of Grenada
- In office February 1974 – March 1979
- Prime Minister: Eric Gairy
- Succeeded by: Bernard Coard

Personal details
- Born: 6 January 1931
- Died: 2 January 2020 (aged 88) Florida
- Party: Grenada United Labour Party

Herbert Preudhomme was Grenadian politician and former Deputy Prime Minister of Grenada.

Preudhomme was born on 6 January 1931. He worked in late 1950s in tourist board and housing and planning authority.

Preudhomme was elected to the Legislative Council of Grenada in the elections of 1961 under Eric Gairy's Grenada United Labour Party (GULP) banner from St. John constituency. He was then appointed as Minister for Commerce, Industry and Tourism in the GULP cabinet. He lost his seat in the 1962 elections, but regained it in 1967. He held a seat in the House of Representatives from 1967 to 1979. In 1967 he held ministerial portfolios of Local Government, Housing, Labour, Youth Development and Sports and then Communications, Works, and Labour. Upon Grenadian independence in February 1974, Gairy appointed him as Deputy Prime Minister. After the 1976 elections, he was given the portfolio of Minister of Health.

In March 1979, when Gairy was out of country, Maurice Bishop and the New Jewel Movement led the Grenadian Revolution, and Preudhomme appealed to Royal Grenada Police Force in Fort George to put down their arms. Preudhomme was then detained in Richmond Hill Prison until 31 December 1981. After the United States invasion of Grenada in October 1983, Preudhomme returned to Grenadian politics, and run as a GULP candidate in the elections of 1984, 1990, 1995 and 2003, but was not elected. After Gairy died, Preudhomme was elected in May 1998 as the next GULP party leader. After the 2003 elections he emigrated to USA.

Preudhomme died on 2 January 2020 in Florida.
