= United Republican Party (Grenada) =

The United Republican Party was a political party in Grenada. It contested the 1995 general elections, but received only 67 votes and failed to win a seat. The party did not contest any further elections.
