= 1995 Grenadian general election =

- 20 June 1995

All 15 seats in the House of Representatives 8 seats needed for a majority
- Registered: 71,413
- Turnout: 61.74% (▼6.68pp)
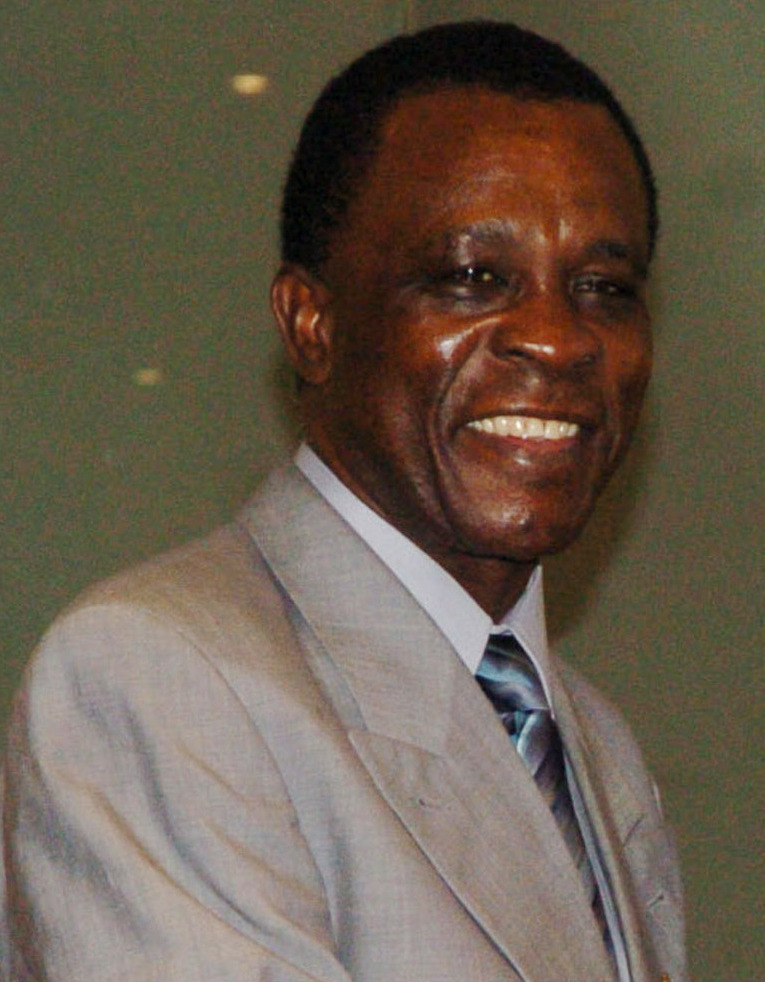

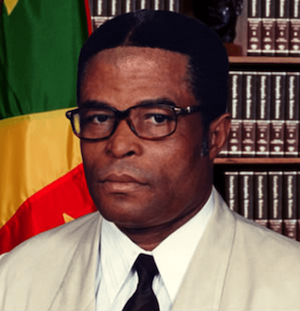

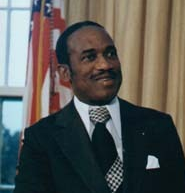
| | First party | Second party | Third party |
|---|---|---|---|
| Leader | Keith Mitchell | George Brizan | Eric Gairy |
| Party | NNP | NDC | GULP |
| Last election | 17.52%, 2 seats | 34.55%, 7 seats | 28.13%, 4 seats |
| Seats won | 8 | 5 | 2 |
| Seat change | ▲6 | ▼2 | ▼2 |
| Popular vote | 14,154 | 13,372 | 11,608 |
| Percentage | 32.37% | 30.59% | 26.55% |
| Swing | ▲14.85pp | ▼3.96pp | ▼1.58pp |
- Results by constituency
Prime Minister before election
George Brizan
NDC
Elected Prime Minister
Keith Mitchell
NNP

General elections were held in Grenada on 20 June 1995. The result was a victory for the New National Party, which won eight of the 15 seats. Voter turnout was 62%.

== Results ==
| Party | Votes | % | Seats | +/– |
|---|---|---|---|---|
| New National Party | 14,154 | 32.37 | 8 | +6 |
| National Democratic Congress | 13,372 | 30.59 | 5 | –2 |
| Grenada United Labour Party | 11,608 | 26.55 | 2 | –2 |
| The National Party | 2,826 | 6.46 | 0 | –2 |
| Maurice Bishop Patriotic Movement | 694 | 1.59 | 0 | 0 |
| United Republican Party | 67 | 0.15 | 0 | New |
| Good Old Democratic Party | 16 | 0.04 | 0 | 0 |
| Independents | 982 | 2.25 | 0 | 0 |
| Total | 43,719 | 100.00 | 15 | 0 |
| Valid votes | 43,719 | 99.16 | | |
| Invalid/blank votes | 371 | 0.84 | | |
| Total votes | 44,090 | 100.00 | | |
| Registered voters/turnout | 71,413 | 61.74 | | |
Source: Nohlen
