= 1951 Grenadian general election =

General elections in Grenada held on 10 October 1951

General elections were held in Grenada on 10 October 1951. They were the first held with universal suffrage. Eric Gairy's Grenada Mental and Manual Workers Union won six of the eight seats. However, at this time the Legislative Council had few powers and the role of head of government remained with the Administrator.

== Results ==
Party	Votes	%	Seats
Grenada Mental and Manual Workers Union	14,197	68.84	6
Action Council	5,175	25.09	2
Independents	1,250	6.06	0
Total	20,622	100.00	8
Valid votes	20,622	87.97	
Invalid/blank votes	2,819	12.03	
Total votes	23,441	100.00	
Registered voters/turnout	33,389	70.21	
Source: Caribbean Elections
