= 1976 Grenadian general election =

- 7 December 1976

All 15 seats in the House of Representatives 8 seats needed for a majority
- Registered: 63,193
- Turnout: 65.19% (▼18.30pp)
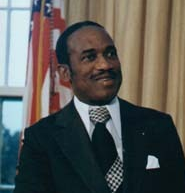

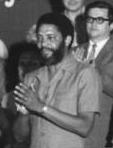
	First party	Second party
Leader	Eric Gairy	Maurice Bishop
Party	GULP	People's Alliance (NJM–GNP–UPP)
Last election	58.87%, 13 seats	41.13%, 2 seats
Seats won	9	6 (Note: NJM: 4 seats; GNP: 1 seat; UPP: 1 seat)
Seat change	▼4	▲4
Popular vote	21,108	18,886
Percentage	51.74%	46.29%
Swing	▼7.13pp	▲5.16pp
- Results by constituency
Prime Minister before election
Eric Gairy
GULP
Elected Prime Minister
Eric Gairy
GULP

General elections were held in Grenada on 7 December 1976. The result was a victory for the Grenada United Labour Party of Eric Gairy, which won nine of the 15 seats, whilst the opposition People's Alliance (a coalition of the New JEWEL Movement, the Grenada National Party and the United People's Party) won the remainder. However, the elections were marred by fraud (and branded fraudulent by international observers), as Gairy's secret police, known as the Mongoose Gang, had been threatening the opposition. Voter turnout was 65%.

Three years later Gairy was overthrown by the New JEWEL Movement, a move which was supported by a significant part of the population.

== Results ==
Party	Votes	%	Seats	+/–
Grenada United Labour Party	21,108	51.74	9	–4
People's Alliance (NJM–GNP–UPP)	18,886	46.29	6	+4
Independents	803	1.97	0	New
Total	40,797	100.00	15	0
Valid votes	40,797	99.03		
Invalid/blank votes	399	0.97		
Total votes	41,196	100.00		
Registered voters/turnout	63,193	65.19		
Source: Nohlen
