= Grenada National Party =

Political party in Grenada

- Leader: Herbert Blaize
- Founded: 1955
- Dissolved: 1979 (banned); 1984 (merged into NNP)
- Succeeded by: New National Party
- Ideology: Conservatism; Economic liberalism; 1961–1962: Grenada-Trinidad unionism
- Political position: Centre-right
- National affiliation: People's Alliance (1976)

The Grenada National Party (GNP) was a conservative and economically liberal political party in Grenada that existed from 1954 to 1984, when it merged into the New National Party. It alternated in power with the Grenada United Labour Party (GULP).

== History ==
The party was founded in 1955 and took its support from the urban middle class and landowners. It first contested national elections in 1957 when it won two of the eight seats, tied with the GULP and the People's Democratic Movement. Its leader Herbert Blaize became the island's leader as part of an anti-GULP coalition. Although GULP convincingly won the next elections in 1961, taking eight of the ten seats, early elections were held in 1962, in which the GNP won six of the 10 seats to return to power. It returned to opposition following the 1967 elections. For the 1976 elections it was part of the People's Alliance alongside the New Jewel Movement and the United People's Party. However, they failed to defeat GULP.

In 1984 it merged with the National Democratic Party and the Grenada Democratic Movement to form the New National Party, with Blaize as its leader.

== Positions ==
At the 1962 election, the GNP campaigned in favour of a "political and economic alliance" with the newly independent state of Trinidad and Tobago. The party's leader Herbert Blaize proposed that Grenada enjoy a similar constitutional status to the island of Tobago, with proportional representation in the Legislative Council of Trinidad and Tobago and possibly guaranteed cabinet representation.

== Election results ==
=== House of Representatives ===
Election	Leader	Votes	%	Seats	+/–	Position	Result
1957	Herbert Blaize	6,012	24.3%	2 / 8	▲2	▲2nd	GNP-Ind coalition government
1961	Herbert Blaize	7,325	33.7%	2 / 10	Steady	2nd	Opposition
1962	Herbert Blaize	11,341	53.7%	6 / 10	▲4	▲1st	Majority government
1967	Herbert Blaize	13,172	45.4%	3 / 10	▼3	▼2nd	Opposition
1972	Herbert Blaize	14,125	41.1%	2 / 15	▼1	2nd	Opposition
1976	Herbert Blaize	5,926 in alliance with NJW and UPP	14.5%	1 / 15	▼1	2nd	Opposition
