= People's Democratic Movement (Grenada) =

The People's Democratic Movement was a political party in Grenada. It first contested national elections in 1957, when it was one of three parties to win two seats in the general elections. It lost both seats in the 1961 elections and did not contest any further elections.
