= Grenada United Labour Party =

- Abbreviation: GULP
- Leader: Geoffrey Preudhomme
- Founder: Eric Gairy
- Founded: 1950; 76 years ago (as Grenada People's Party)
- Headquarters: Gladstone Road, Grenville, St. Andrew's
- Newspaper: The Grenada Guardian
- Paramilitary wing: Mongoose Gang (1967–1979)
- Ideology: Populism; Nationalism; Republicanism; Conservatism; Labourism
- Political position: Right-wing
- Colors: Red
- House of Representatives: 0 / 16
- Senate: 0 / 13

Party flag

Website
- gulpgrenada.com

The Grenada United Labour Party (GULP) is a political party in Grenada.

== History ==
The party was founded by Eric Gairy in 1950. It contested the first elections held under universal suffrage in 1951, and won six of the eight seats. The 1954 elections saw the same outcome. In the 1957 elections it lost four seats, whilst two other parties, the Grenada National Party and the People's Democratic Movement also won two seats, with the GNP's leader Herbert Blaize becoming leader of the island.

The party regained power after winning eight of the ten seats in the 1961 elections. It lost the 1962 elections to the GNP, before returning to power in the 1967 elections. The party remained in power following the 1972 elections, but Gairy's government became increasingly authoritarian, with his secret police (the Mongoose Gang) threatening the opposition. Following the 1976 elections, which were branded fraudulent by international observers, Gairy was overthrown in a coup in 1979.

After democracy was restored, GULP won only a single seat in the 1984 elections and has since remained in opposition. Eric Gairy died in 1997, and was succeeded as party leader by Herbert Preudhomme. The party formed an alliance with United Labour for the 1999 elections, in which it lost parliamentary representation for the first time since 1951. However, it regained a seat when Michael Baptiste of the ruling New National Party defected to GULP in June 2000.

Gloria Payne Banfield was elected as GULP leader in February 2003, becoming Grenada's first female party leader. In the general elections the party won 3.2% of the vote but again failed to win a seat. For the 2008 elections it formed an alliance with the People's Labour Movement named the Labour Platform. The alliance fielded 11 candidates for the 15 seats, but received only 478 votes and no seats.

== Election results ==
=== House of Representatives elections ===
Election	Party leader	Votes	%	Seats	+/–	Position	Result
1951	Eric Gairy	13,328	68.8%	6 / 8	▲6	▲1st	Opposing majority
1954	Eric Gairy	10,347	48.7%	6 / 8	Steady	1st	Opposing majority
1957	Eric Gairy	10,952	44.3%	2 / 8	▼4	1st	Opposition
1961	Eric Gairy	11,606	53.3%	8 / 10	▲6	1st	Majority government
1962	Eric Gairy	9,705	46.0%	4 / 10	▼4	▼2nd	Opposition
1967	Eric Gairy	15,827	54.6%	7 / 10	▲3	▲1st	Majority government
1972	Eric Gairy	20,164	58.9%	13 / 15	▲6	1st	Majority government
1976	Eric Gairy	21,108	51.7%	9 / 15	▼4	1st	Majority government
1984	Eric Gairy	14,721	35.9%	1 / 15	▼8	▼2nd	Opposition
1990	Eric Gairy	11,105	28.1%	4 / 15	▲12	2nd	Opposition
1995	Eric Gairy	11,608	26.6%	2 / 15	▼2	▼3rd	Opposition
1999	Herbert Preudhomme	4,853	11.7%	0 / 15	▼2	3rd	Extra-parliamentary
2003	Gloria Payne Banfield	2,243	4.7%	0 / 15	Steady	3rd	Extra-parliamentary
2008	Gloria Payne Banfield	478	0.8%	0 / 15	Steady	3rd	Extra-parliamentary
2013	Did not contest						
2018	Did not contest						
2022	Geoffrey Preudhomme	64	0.1%	0 / 15	Steady	3rd	Extra-parliamentary
2026	Geoffrey Preudhomme	35	0.06%	0 / 15	Steady	▼5th	Extra-parliamentary
