= Herbert Blaize =

Grenadian politician

The Right Honourable Herbert Augustus Blaize
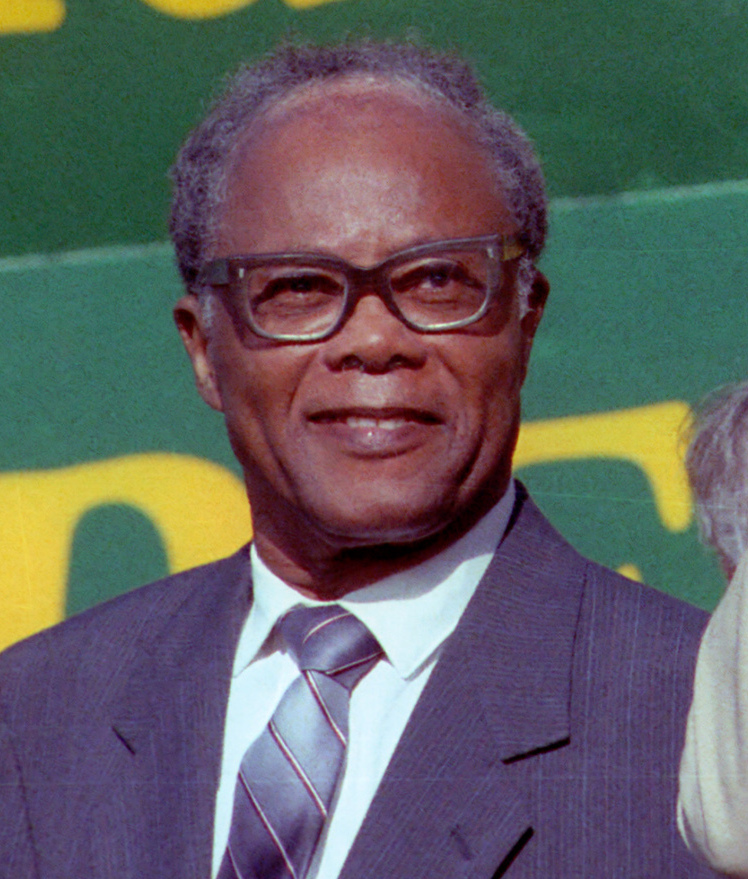
- Blaize in 1986

Prime Minister of Grenada
- In office 4 December 1984 – 19 December 1989
- Monarch: Elizabeth II
- Governor General: Paul Scoon
- Deputy: Ben Jones
- Preceded by: Nicholas Brathwaite
- Succeeded by: Ben Jones

Member of Parliament for Carriacou and Petite Martinique
- In office 1957 – 19 December 1989
- Preceded by: Hon. Frederick B Paterson
- Succeeded by: Hon. Nicholas Brathwaite

Premier of Grenada
- In office 3 March 1967 – 25 August 1967
- Monarch: Elizabeth II
- Preceded by: Himself as Chief Minister
- Succeeded by: Eric Matthew Gairy

Chief Minister of Grenada
- In office September 1962 – 3 March 1967
- Monarch: Elizabeth II
- Preceded by: Eric Matthew Gairy
- Succeeded by: Himself as Premier

Chief Minister of Grenada
- In office January 1960 – March 1961
- Monarch: Elizabeth II
- Preceded by: Chief Minister established
- Succeeded by: George E. D. Clyne

Personal details
- Born: 26 February 1918 Beausejour, Carriacou, Grenada
- Died: 19 December 1989 (aged 71) St George's, Grenada
- Party: Grenada National Party; New National Party; The National Party
- Spouse: Dame Venetia Blaize
- Children: 6

Herbert Augustus Blaize PC (26 February 1918 – 19 December 1989) was a Grenadian politician and leader of the Grenada National Party. When Grenada was still a British Crown Colony he served as the first Chief Minister from 1960 to 1961, and again from 1962 to 1967. He became the first Premier of the autonomous Associated State of Grenada briefly in 1967. In the first elections following the 1983 coups and the American-led invasion of Grenada, he served as Prime Minister from 1984 until his death in 1989.

== Early years ==
Blaize was born in the island of Carriacou, which along with the island of Petite Martinique is a part of Grenada. He moved to Aruba where he worked many years in the oil refinery of the Lago Oil and Transport Company.

== Grenada National Party ==
In 1953 he formed the Grenada National Party as a rival party to the Grenada United Labour Party of Eric Gairy, who would be Blaize's main political rival for the next 25 years. Blaize entered the legislature in 1957 and became Minister of Trade and Production.

== Chief Minister and Premier ==
He was appointed as Chief Minister in 1960 and held the additional portfolio of finance. He lost power to Gairy in 1961, and was reappointed in 1962 after Gairy was dismissed. In 1967 Grenada became an associated state within the British Empire, gaining more internal self-government. He was the Leader of the Opposition in the House of Representatives of Grenada from 1974 to 1976.

At the 1962 Grenadian general election, Blaize campaigned on a platform of "political and economic alliance" with the newly independent Trinidad and Tobago. He held talks with Trinidad's prime minister Eric E. Williams and proposed that Grenada enjoy a similar constitutional status to the island of Tobago, with proportional representation in the Legislative Council of Trinidad and Tobago and possibly guaranteed cabinet representation.

== In Opposition ==
In 1976 Blaize's center-right National Party joined forces with the left-wing New Jewel Movement led by Maurice Bishop for the elections that year, which Gairy and the GULP won. The alliance between Blaize and Bishop ended by 1979 when Bishop seized power. Blaize retired from politics and moved back to Carriacou, until after the intervention by the United States in 1983.

== Prime minister ==
During the election campaign of 1984, Blaize merged his parties with several other center-right parties to form the New National Party, which took 14 of 15 seats in the election.

In addition to being Prime Minister, Blaize became Minister of Home Affairs, Security, Information, Finance, Trade, Planning, Industrial Development and Carriacou and Petite Martinique Affairs.

Blaize's government advocated a strong economic and military alliance for Grenada with the United States, and other overseas investment.

== Death ==
He died in December 1989 near St. George's, Grenada, following a several-years-long battle with prostate cancer, aged 71. Two days before his death, Blaize had been elected the first party leader of the newly formed The National Party.

== Family ==
Herbert Blaize was survived by his wife, Dame Venetia Blaize, DBE (née Venetia Ursula Davidson); three daughters, Norma Blaize (a former Consul-General of Grenada in New York), Carol Jerome and Marion Fleary; three sons, Samuel Blaize, Marvin Blaize and Christopher Blaize. He was also survived by a sister, Muriel Noel.

Political offices
Preceded by New Office	Chief Minister of Grenada; January 1960 – March 1961	Succeeded by George E. D. Clyne
Preceded by -	Minister of Finance of Grenada; 1961	Succeeded by George E. D. Clyne
Preceded by Eric Gairy	Chief Minister of Grenada; September 1962 – 3 March 1967	Succeeded by Post Abolished
Preceded by Eric Gairy	Minister of Finance of Grenada; September 1962 – August 1967	Succeeded by George Hosten
Preceded by New Office	Premier of Grenada; 3 March – 25 August 1967	Succeeded by Eric Gairy
Preceded by Nicholas Brathwaite	Prime Minister of Grenada; 4 December 1984 – 19 December 1989	Succeeded by Ben Jones
Preceded by Allen Kirton	Minister of Finance of Grenada; 1984 – 1989	Succeeded by Ben Jones

== Sources ==
- LA GRENADE : mort du premier ministre., Le Monde. Jeudi 21 décembre 1989, p. 3; accessed October 7, 2006.
