= Eric Gairy =

Grenadian politician (1974–79)

The Right Honourable Sir Eric Gairy
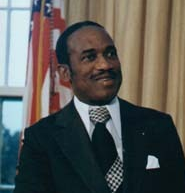
- Gairy in 1977

Prime Minister of Grenada
- In office 7 February 1974 – 13 March 1979
- Monarch: Elizabeth II
- Governors General: Sir Leo de Gale; Sir Paul Scoon
- Deputy: Herbert Preudhomme
- Preceded by: Himself as Premier
- Succeeded by: Maurice Bishop

Premier of Grenada
- In office 25 August 1967 – 6 February 1974
- Monarch: Elizabeth II
- Preceded by: Herbert A. Blaize
- Succeeded by: Himself as Prime Minister

Chief Minister of Grenada
- In office August 1961 – 19 June 1962
- Monarch: Elizabeth II
- Preceded by: George E. D. Clyne
- Succeeded by: Herbert A. Blaize

Personal details
- Born: February 18, 1922 Dunfermline, Grenada
- Died: August 23, 1997 (aged 75) Grand Anse, Grenada
- Party: Grenada United Labour Party
- Spouse: Cynthia Gairy (1949–1997)
- Children: Jennifer and Marcelle

Sir Eric Matthew Gairy PC (18 February 1922 – 23 August 1997) was the first Prime Minister of Grenada, serving from his country's independence in 1974 until his overthrow in a coup by Maurice Bishop in 1979. Gairy also served as head of government in pre-independence Grenada as Chief Minister from 1961 to 1962 and as Premier from 1967 to 1974.

== Early days in Grenada: 1922–41 ==
Eric Matthew Gairy was the son of Douglas and Theresa Gairy, and was born 18 February 1922 in Dunfermline, St. Andrew's Parish on the eastern side of the island near Grenville, Grenada. He attended the LaFillette School and then the St. Andrews Roman Catholic Senior School. He was also an acolyte at St. Andrew's Roman Catholic Church, next door to the school. He became a primary "student-teacher" in the LaFillette School from January 1939 to September 1941. He moved to Aruba where he worked several years in the oil refinery of the Lago Oil and Transport Company.

== Trade union leader and "Sky Red": 1950–51 ==
Eric Gairy returned to Grenada in December, 1949 to enter trade unionism and politics. In 1950 he founded the Grenada Manual & Metal Workers Union (GMMWU) and was deeply involved in encouraging the 1951 general strike for better working conditions. This sparked great unrest – so many buildings were set ablaze that the disturbances became known as the "Sky Red" days – and the British authorities called in military reinforcements to regain control of the situation. Gairy himself was taken into custody.

== Radical political leader: 1951–61 ==
In 1950, Gairy founded the Grenada United Labour Party. He was elected as a representative of the Colony of Grenada's Legislative Council in 1951, 1954, and 1957. He was banned from political activities and lost his seat between 1957 and 1961.

== Chief Minister: 1961–62 ==
Gairy was returned in a by-election in July 1961 and became Chief Minister, as his party held a majority in the Legislative Council since winning the 1961 general election. He served as Chief Minister and Minister of Finance from August 1961 until April 1962 when he was dismissed by the British colonial Governor for the questionable use of state funds.

== Leader of the Opposition: 1962–67 ==
Gairy's party lost the 1962 general election and he served as leader of the opposition between 1962 and 1967.

== Premier: 1967–74 ==
=== First administration: 1967–72 ===
Gairy won the 1967 general election and formed a new administration as Premier of the Associated State of Grenada.

=== Miss World controversy ===
At the 1970 Miss World pageant held in London, controversy followed the victory of Grenadian contestant Jennifer Hosten, who became the first Black Miss World. South African contestant Pearl Jansen, who was also Black, placed second. Because Gairy served on the judging panel, allegations quickly arose that the result had been influenced. The BBC and various newspapers received numerous complaints, while accusations of racism were voiced from multiple sides. Of the nine judges, four awarded first-place votes to Miss Sweden, Marjorie Christel Johansson, whereas Miss Grenada received only two such votes; nevertheless, Johansson ultimately placed fourth. Following the contest, some spectators gathered outside the Royal Albert Hall, chanting "Swe-den, Swe-den". Amid sustained media pressure, organizing director Julia Morley resigned four days later. In subsequent years, Johansson was reported to have stated that she had been unfairly denied the title.

=== Second administration 1972–74 ===
Gairy won the 1972 general election and formed a new administration as Premier of the Associated State of Grenada.

== Prime Minister: 1974–79 ==
=== First administration: 1974–76 ===
Gairy became the first Prime Minister of Grenada when Grenada achieved independence from Great Britain on 7 February 1974. Gairy's term in office coincided with civil strife in Grenada. The political environment was highly charged, with Gairy's secret police, the Mongoose Gang, terrorizing opponents.

=== Second administration: 1976–79 ===
Gairy's party narrowly won the 1976 election but the result was declared fraudulent by international observers due to intimidation of the opposition by the Mongoose Gang.

On 27 November 1978, Eric Gairy led a group including scientists and an astronaut in addressing the United Nations on the subject of UFOs.

US citizens helped to support the overthrow of Eric Gairy with solidarity movements. One such solidarity movement existed in San Antonio, Texas and was headed by African-American activist Mario Marcel Salas, who was active in his overthrow on a number of levels. Civil strife took the form of street violence between government supporters, including the Mongoose Gang, and gangs organized by the New Jewel Movement (NJM). In the late 1970s, the NJM began planning to overthrow the government, with party members receiving military training outside of Grenada.

In 1979, a rumour circulated that Gairy would use the Gang to eliminate leaders of the New Jewel Movement while he was out of the country. In response, Bishop overthrew Gairy in March of that year while the latter was visiting the United States.

On 13 March 1979, while Gairy was at the UN for further discussions on UFOs, the New Jewel Movement led by Maurice Bishop launched a largely bloodless coup and overthrew the government. Bishop suspended the constitution, and the New Jewel Movement ruled the country by decree until 1983. Anti-Gairy activity was carried out in the United States in support of the revolution to overthrow Gairy, including activists in San Antonio, Texas.

== Exile in the United States: 1979–83 ==
Gairy stayed in exile in the United States until 1983, when the United States, backed by some Caribbean allies – notably, Dame Eugenia Charles, Prime Minister of Dominica and Edward Seaga, Prime Minister of Jamaica – invaded to topple a military government which had overthrown and killed Bishop.

== Return and final days: 1983–97 ==
Gairy then returned to Grenada and campaigned in the elections of 1984, claiming to be a changed man. However, his party lost the elections, winning 36% of the popular vote but only a single seat in the House of Representatives. Attempts by Gairy and his party to return to power in 1990 and 1995 were also unsuccessful.

On June 7, 1996, while Gairy was in Venezuela, he suffered a stroke and had to be hospitalized. The following year on August 23, he died at his home in Grand Anse, Grenada. He was 75. He was succeeded as the GULP leader by Herbert Preudhomme.

== See also ==
- History of Grenada
- Sir Eric Matthew Gairy Botanical Gardens

Political offices
Preceded by George E. D. Clyne	Chief Minister of Grenada; August 1961 - 19 June 1962	Succeeded by Herbert Blaize
Preceded by George E. D. Clyne	Minister of Finance of Grenada; August 1961 - 19 June 1962	Succeeded by Herbert Blaize
Preceded by Herbert Blaize	Premier of Grenada; 25 August 1967 - 7 February 1974	Succeeded by Himself as Prime Minister
Preceded by Himself as Premier	Prime Minister of Grenada; 7 February 1974 - 13 March 1979	Succeeded by Maurice Bishop
