= List of heads of state of Grenada =

This is a list of the heads of state of Grenada, from the independence of Grenada in 1974 to the present day.

The head of state under the Grenada Independence Act 1974 is the King of Grenada, Charles III, who is also the monarch of the other Commonwealth realms. The King is represented in Grenada by a Governor-General.

== Monarch (1974–present) ==
The succession to the throne is the same as the succession to the British throne.

No.	Portrait	Monarch (Birth–Death)	Reign			Royal House	Prime Minister
No.	Portrait	Monarch (Birth–Death)	Reign start	Reign end	Duration	Royal House	Prime Minister
1		Queen Elizabeth II (1926–2022)	7 February 1974	8 September 2022	48 years, 213 days	Windsor	Gairy; Bishop; Coard; Austin; Brathwaite; Blaize; Jones; Brathwaite; Brizan; K. Mitchell; Thomas; K. Mitchell; D. Mitchell
2		King Charles III (born 1948)	8 September 2022	Incumbent	3 years, 88 days	Windsor	D. Mitchell

=== Governor-General ===
The Governor-General is the representative of the Monarch in Grenada and exercises most of the powers of the Monarch. The Governor-General is appointed for an indefinite term, serving at the pleasure of the Monarch. After the passage of the Statute of Westminster 1931, the Governor-General is appointed solely on the advice of the Cabinet of Grenada without the involvement of the British government. In the event of a vacancy the Chief Justice served as Officer Administering the Government.

Following is a list of people who have served as Governor-General of Grenada since independence in 1974.

Denotes acting Governor-General

No.	Portrait	Name (Birth–Death)	Term of office			Monarch (Reign)
No.	Portrait	Name (Birth–Death)	Took office	Left office	Time in office	Monarch (Reign)
1		Sir Leo de Gale (1921–1986)	7 February 1974	4 October 1978	4 years, 239 days	Elizabeth II (1974–2022)
2		Sir Paul Scoon (1935–2013)	4 October 1978	31 July 1992	13 years, 301 days	Elizabeth II (1974–2022)
–		Reginald Palmer (1923–2016)	31 July 1992	6 August 1992	6 days	Elizabeth II (1974–2022)
3		Sir Reginald Palmer (1923–2016)	6 August 1992	8 August 1996	4 years, 2 days	Elizabeth II (1974–2022)
4		Sir Daniel Williams (1935–2024)	8 August 1996	18 November 2008	12 years, 102 days	Elizabeth II (1974–2022)
Vacant (18 – 27 November 2008)						Elizabeth II (1974–2022)
5		Sir Carlyle Glean (1932–2021)	27 November 2008	7 May 2013	4 years, 161 days	Elizabeth II (1974–2022)
6		Dame Cécile La Grenade (born 1952)	7 May 2013	Incumbent	12 years, 212 days	
6		Dame Cécile La Grenade (born 1952)	7 May 2013	Incumbent	12 years, 212 days	Charles III (2022–present)

== Standards ==
Governor-General's Standard
