= Monarchy of Grenada =

King of Grenada
- Coat of Arms of Grenada

Incumbent
- Charles III since 8 September 2022

Details
- Style: His Majesty
- Heir apparent: William, Prince of Wales
- First monarch: Elizabeth II
- Formed: 7 February 1974

The monarchy of Grenada is a system of government in which a hereditary monarch is the sovereign and head of state of Grenada. The current Grenadian monarch and head of state, since 8 September 2022, is King Charles III. As sovereign, he is the personal embodiment of the Grenadian Crown. Although the person of the sovereign is equally shared with 14 other independent countries within the Commonwealth of Nations, each country's monarchy is separate and legally distinct. As a result, the current monarch is officially titled King of Grenada and, in this capacity, he and other members of the royal family undertake public and private functions domestically and abroad as representatives of Grenada. However, the King is the only member of the royal family with any constitutional role.

All executive authority of Grenada is vested in the sovereign, and royal assent is required for the Parliament of Grenada to enact laws and for letters patent and Orders in Council to have legal effect. Most of the powers are exercised by the elected members of parliament, the ministers of the Crown generally drawn from amongst them, and the judges and justices of the peace. Other powers vested in the monarch, such as dismissal of a prime minister, are significant but are treated only as reserve powers and as an important security part of the role of the monarchy.

The Crown primarily functions as a nonpartisan guarantor of continuous and stable governance in the country, with the most notable instance being the period of revolutionary government from 1979 to 1983. While some powers are exercisable only by the sovereign, most of the monarch's operational and ceremonial duties are exercised by his representative, the governor-general of Grenada.

== History ==
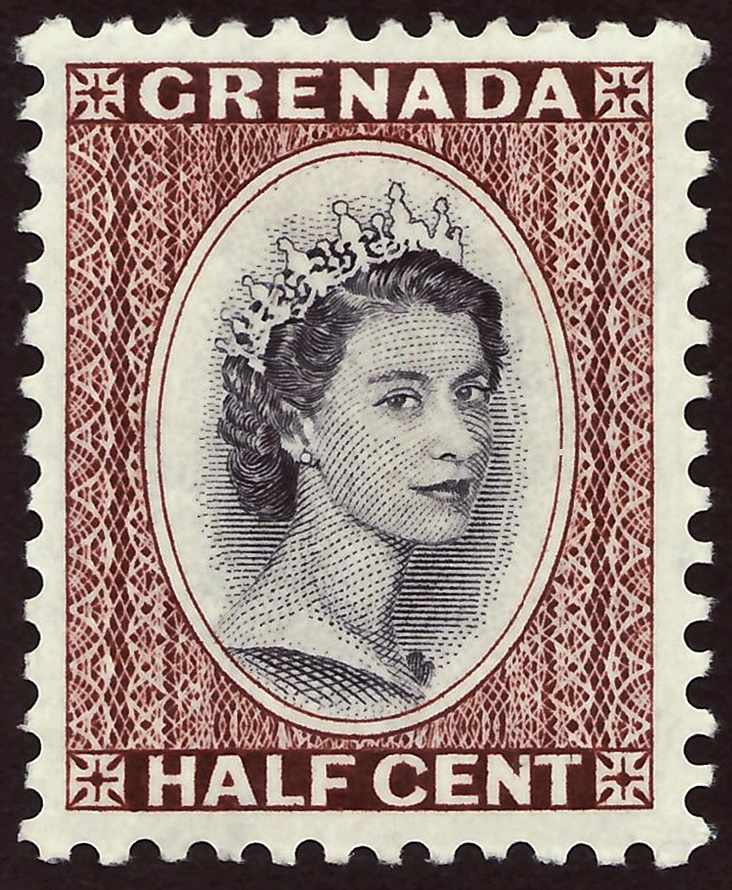
1953 stamp featuring Queen Elizabeth II

Grenada was sighted by Christopher Columbus in 1498. First settled by indigenous peoples, Grenada by the time of European contact was inhabited by the Caribs. French colonists killed most of the Caribs on the island and established plantations on the island, eventually importing African slaves to work on the sugar plantations. Grenada remained French until 1762, when it capitulated to the British. It was formally ceded to Britain in 1763 by the Treaty of Paris. In 1779 it was recaptured by the French, but it was restored to Britain in 1783. The emancipation of the slaves finally took effect in 1833.

Grenada was headquarters of the government of the British Windward Islands from 1885 until 1958, when Grenada joined the West Indies Federation. The federation ended in 1962, after which Grenada attempted to federate with the remaining territories in the Eastern Caribbean. In March 1967, however, the island was granted "associate statehood" status by the United Kingdom, giving it complete control over its internal affairs.

A constitutional conference was held in London in 1973. Grenada gained independence on 7 February 1974, as a sovereign state and independent constitutional monarchy with Queen Elizabeth II as the head of state of Grenada. Prince Richard of Gloucester was due to represent the Queen at the independence celebrations, but his visit was cancelled as the transition to independence was marked by violence, strikes, and controversy centring upon Eric Gairy, who was named prime minister. Opposition to Gairy's rule continued to mount, and a coalition called the New Jewel Movement (NJM) staged a bloodless coup in 1979, proclaiming the People's Revolutionary Government in Grenada, with their leader Maurice Bishop as prime minister.

=== People's Revolutionary Government (1979–1983) ===
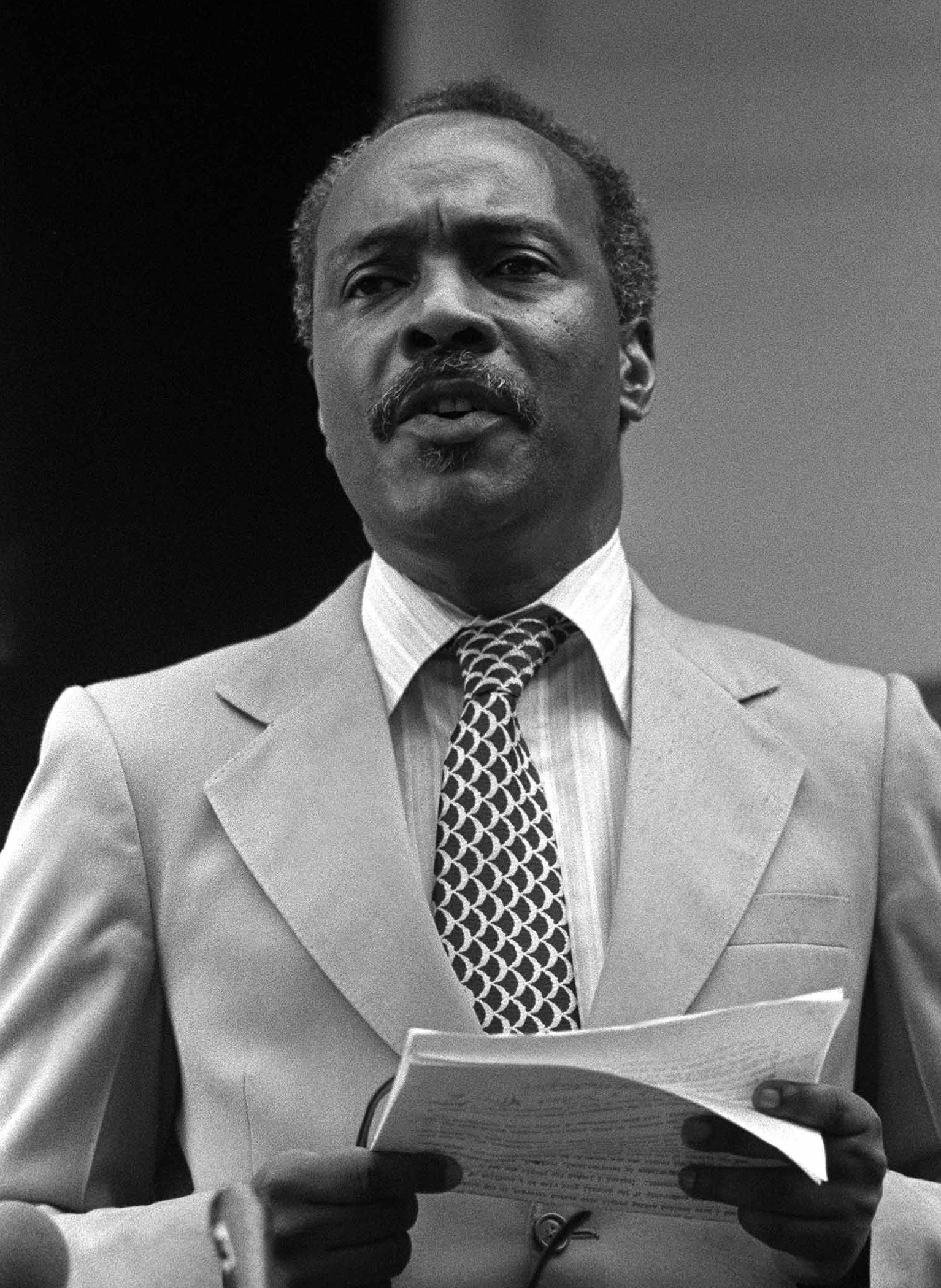
Governor-General Sir Paul Scoon in 1983

The New Jewel Movement led by Maurice Bishop seized power in a coup d'état and established the People's Revolutionary Government (PRG) on 13 March 1979. On 25 March, Bishop announced the "People's Laws", which effectively suspended the 1974 constitution, but retained the Queen as Grenada's head of state. People's Law Number 3 stated:

The Head of State shall remain Her Majesty the Queen and her representative in this country shall continue to be the Governor-General who shall perform such functions as the People's Revolutionary Government may from time to time advise.

This was seen as an attempt by the People's Revolutionary Government to give an air of constitutional legitimacy to their administration. The Governor-General, Paul Scoon, who was also kept in office as the Queen's representative, became a mere figurehead, as the PRG had assumed both executive and legislative powers. Between 1979 and 1983, Scoon was said to have a "fairly relaxed" relationship with the PRG. This marked the first time in history that a "communist monarchy" existed within the Commonwealth of Nations.

In October 1983, following a power struggle within Bishop's own administration, the People's Revolutionary Government was overthrown in a violent coup in which Prime Minister Bishop and several other government officials were executed. A 16-member military council led by Hudson Austin took power and placed Scoon under house arrest. Scoon, acting through secret diplomatic channels, asked the United States and concerned Caribbean nations to intervene to restore peace and order to the island. The invasion coalition maintained that Scoon was within his rights to do so, acting under the reserve powers vested in the Crown. But an independent expert examination later found dubious constitutional basis for Scoon's call for foreign intervention and his assumption of executive and legislative power. On 25 October 1983, following the United States invasion of Grenada, the military junta was deposed, and Scoon and his family were evacuated from his official residence in St George's. The US and Caribbean governments quickly reaffirmed Scoon as the Queen's only legitimate representative in Grenada — and hence the only lawful authority on the island. It was later confirmed that Scoon had been in contact with the Queen ahead of the invasion; however, the Queen's office denied knowledge of any request for military action and the Queen was "extremely upset" by the invasion of one of her realms. The only document signed by the Governor-General asking for military assistance was dated after the invasion, which fuelled speculation that the United States had used Scoon as an excuse for its incursion into Grenada. Scoon, in his memoir, published in 2003, clarified that he had asked other Caribbean governments for the intervention of an allied military force.

Following the invasion, the Governor-General, in the absence of a parliament and elected government, assumed executive and legislative powers, and reinstated the 1974 constitution. A nine-member Interim Advisory Council, led by Nicholas Brathwaite, was appointed in November 1983, to serve until elections due in 1984, which subsequently resulted in the victory of Herbert Blaize of the New National Party. This constitutes one of the few times in Commonwealth history that the Crown has been the active and dominant executive authority in a realm.

== The Grenadian Crown and its aspects ==
Grenada is one of fifteen independent nations, known as Commonwealth realms, which shares its sovereign with other realms in the Commonwealth of Nations, with the monarch's relationship with Grenada completely independent from his position as monarch of any other realm. Despite sharing the same person as their respective monarch, each of the Commonwealth realms – including Grenada – is sovereign and independent of the others. The Grenadian monarch is represented by a viceroy—the governor-general of Grenada—in the country.

My wife and I hold such special memories of our visit to your beautiful 'Spice Island' five years ago, and of the warm and touching welcome you extended to us. Then, as whenever I have met Grenadians anywhere in the world, I was struck by your resilience, the strength of your community and by your shared determination to make a positive difference.

— Charles III of Grenada, 2024

Since the independence of Grenada in 1974, the pan-national Crown has had both a shared and a separate character and the sovereign's role as monarch of Grenada is distinct to his or her position as monarch of any other realm, including the United Kingdom. The monarchy thus ceased to be an exclusively British institution and in Grenada became a Grenadian, or "domesticated" establishment.

This division is illustrated in a number of ways: The sovereign, for example, holds a unique Grenadian title and, when he is acting in public specifically as a representative of Grenada, he uses, where possible, Grenadian symbols, including the country's national flag, unique royal symbols, and the like. Only Grenadian government ministers can advise the sovereign on matters of Grenada.

In Grenada, the legal personality of the State is referred to as "His Majesty in right of Grenada", "His Majesty in right of His Government of Grenada", or the "Crown in right of its Government in Grenada".

=== Title ===
In Grenada, the King's official title is: Charles the Third, by the Grace of God, King of Grenada and of His other Realms and Territories, Head of the Commonwealth.

This style communicates Grenada's status as an independent monarchy, highlighting the monarch's role specifically as sovereign of Grenada, as well as the shared aspect of the Crown throughout the realms. Typically, the Sovereign is styled "King of Grenada", and is addressed as such when in Grenada, or performing duties on behalf of Grenada abroad.

=== Succession ===
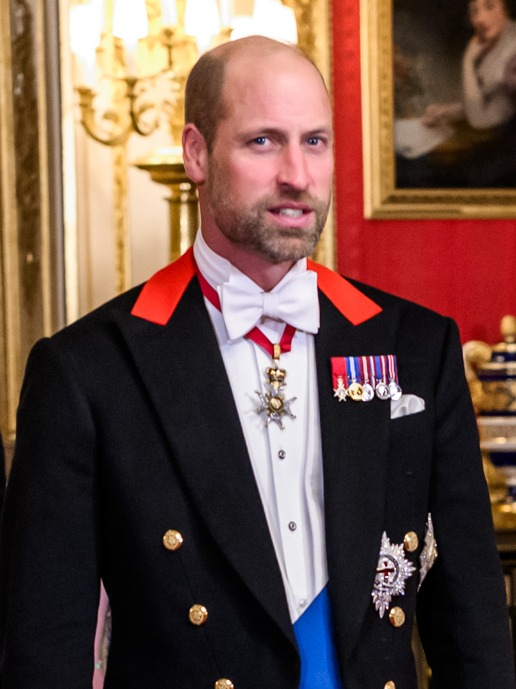
William, Prince of Wales, is the current heir apparent

Like some realms, Grenada defers to United Kingdom law to determine the line of succession.

Succession is by absolute primogeniture governed by the provisions of the Succession to the Crown Act 2013, as well as the Act of Settlement 1701 and the Bill of Rights 1689. This legislation limits the succession to the natural (i.e. non-adopted), legitimate descendants of Sophia, Electress of Hanover, and stipulates that the monarch cannot be a Roman Catholic, and must be in communion with the Church of England upon ascending the throne. Though these constitutional laws, as they apply to Grenada, still lie within the control of the British parliament, neither the United Kingdom nor Grenada can change the rules of succession without the unanimous consent of the other realms, unless explicitly leaving the shared monarchy relationship. This applies identically in all the other realms, and has been likened to a treaty amongst these countries.

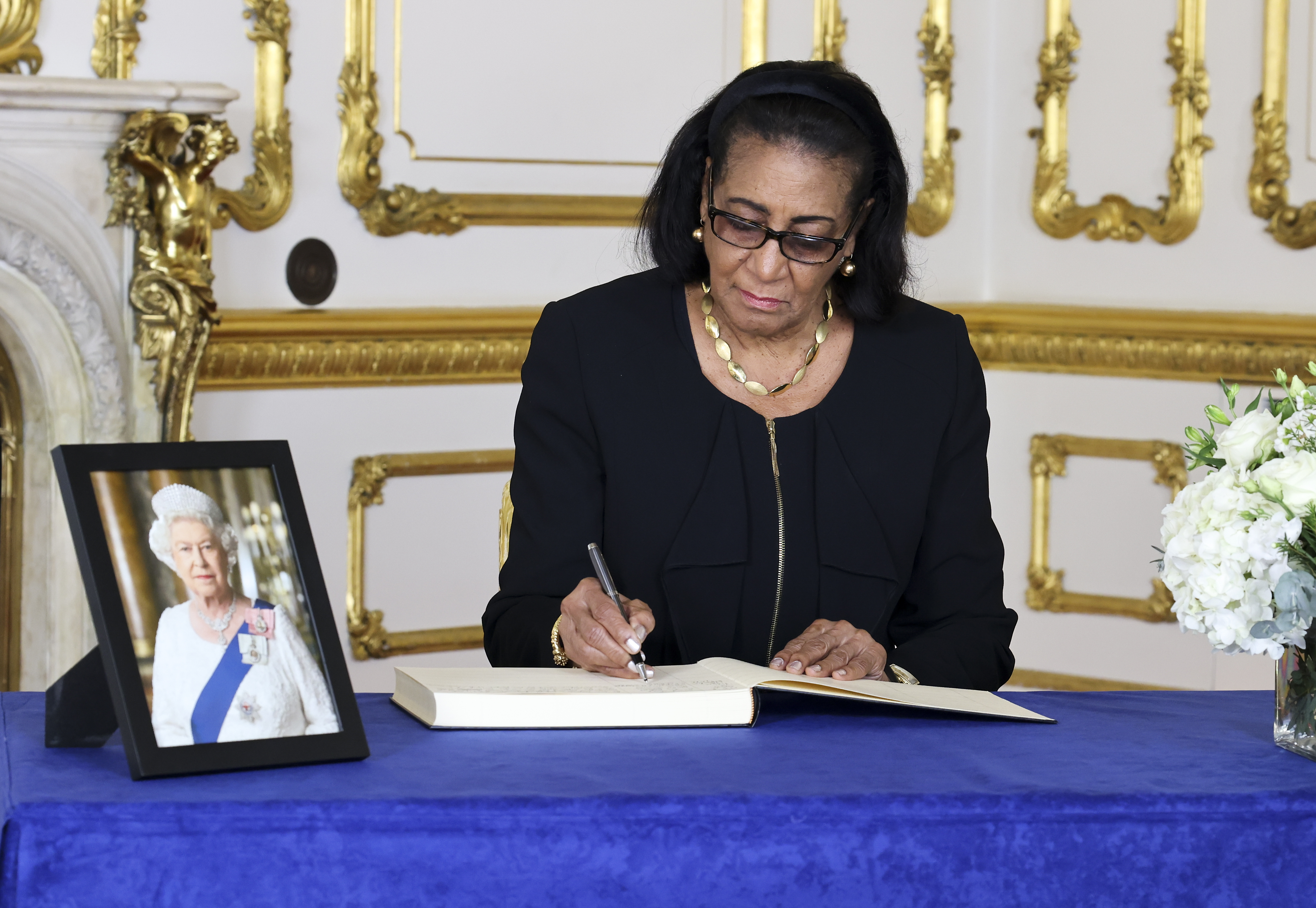
Governor-General Dame Cécile La Grenade signing the book of condolence for Queen Elizabeth II at Lancaster House, 17 September 2022

Upon a demise of the Crown (the death or abdication of a sovereign), it is customary for the accession of the new monarch to be publicly proclaimed by the governor-general in the capital, St. George's, after the accession. Regardless of any proclamations, the late sovereign's heir immediately and automatically succeeds, without any need for confirmation or further ceremony. An appropriate period of mourning also follows, during which flags across the country are flown at half-mast to honour the late monarch. A memorial service is likely to be held to commemorate the late monarch.

== Constitutional role and royal prerogative ==
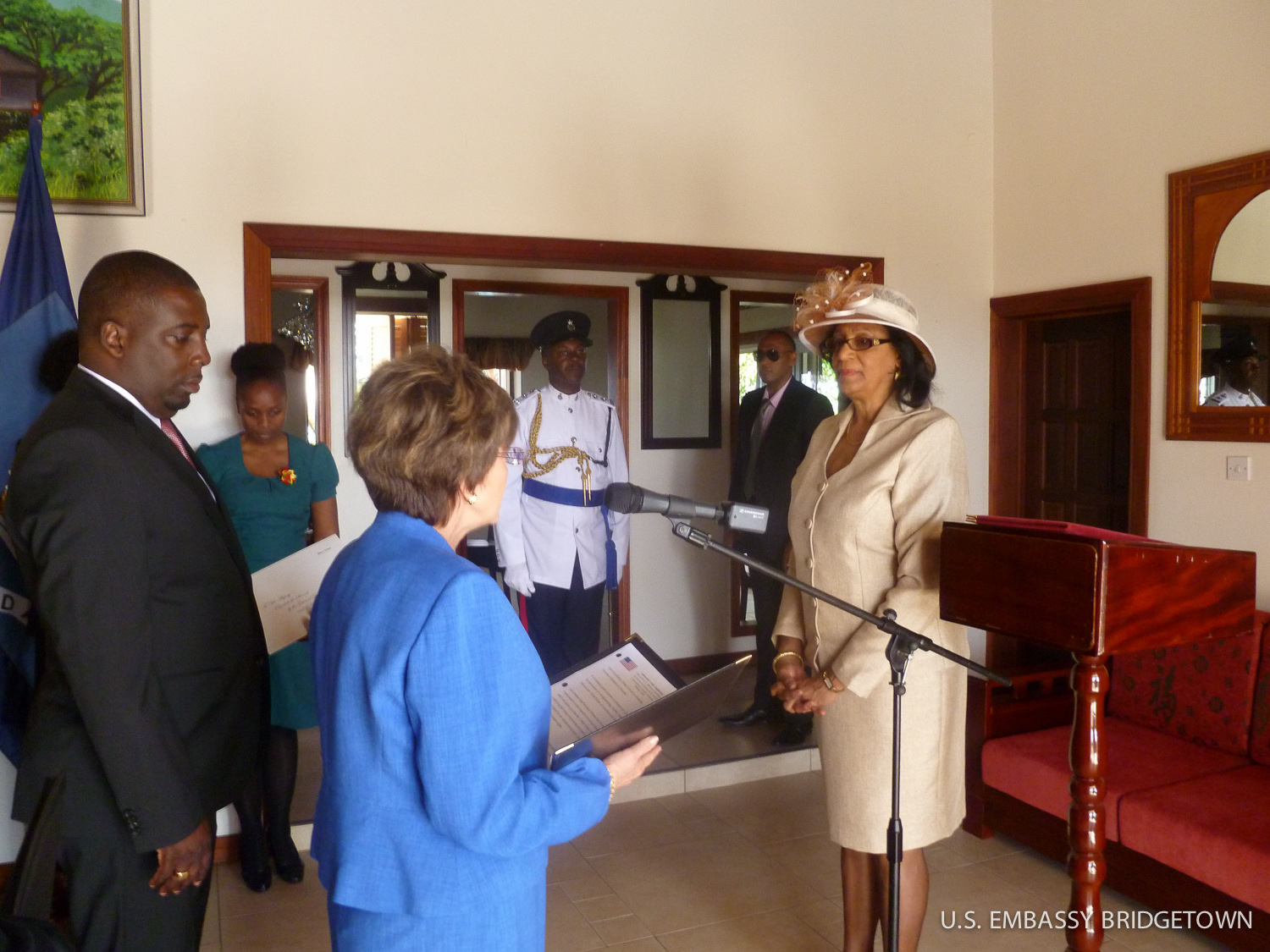
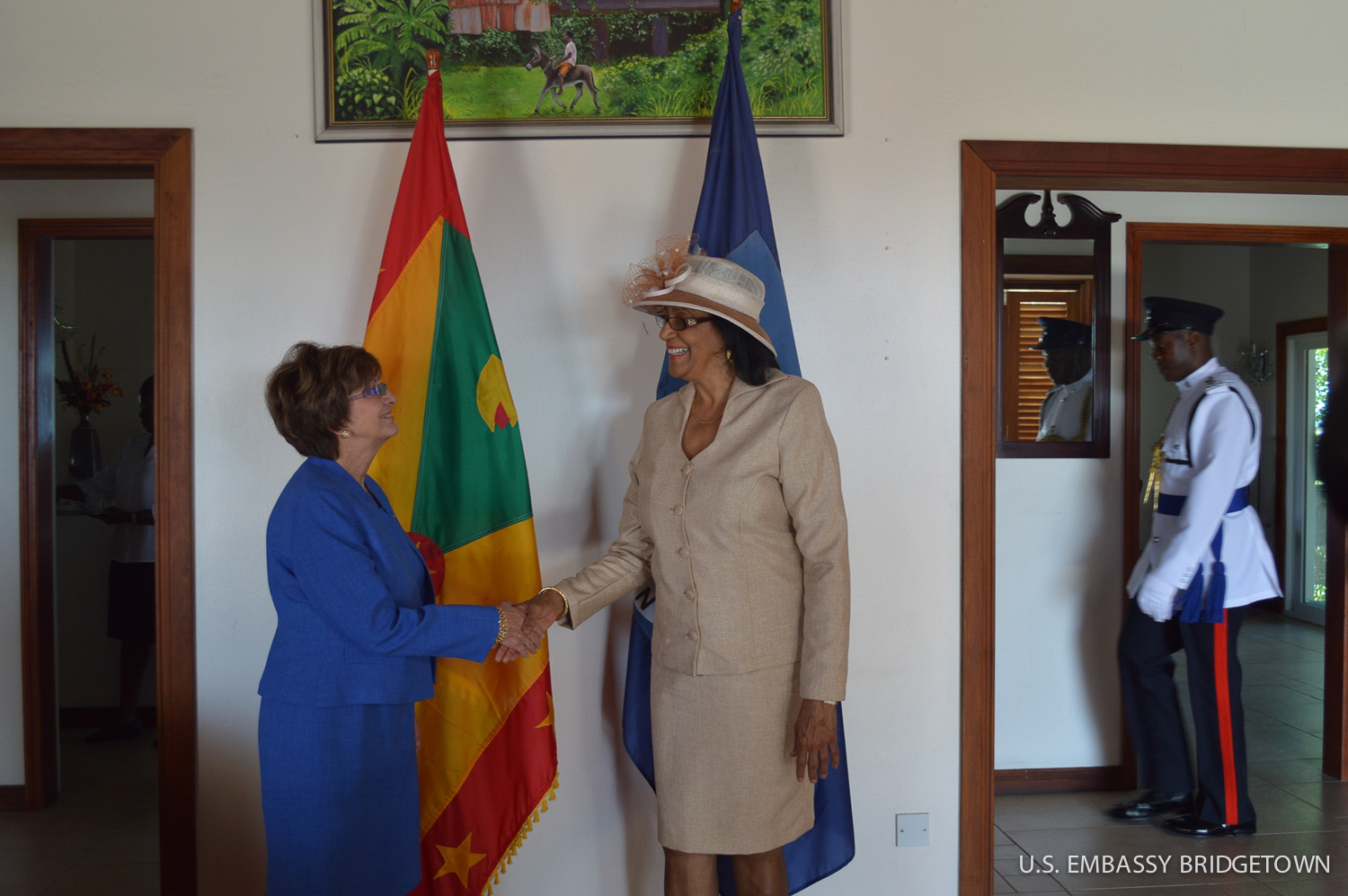
Governor-General Dame Cécile La Grenade receiving credentials from US Ambassador Linda Swartz Taglialatela, 2016

The constitution of Grenada is made up of a variety of statutes and conventions which gives the country a parliamentary system of government under a constitutional monarchy, wherein the roles of the monarch and governor-general are both legal and practical, but not political. The Crown is regarded as a corporation, in which several parts share the authority of the whole, with the sovereign as the person at the centre of the constitutional construct, meaning all powers of state are constitutionally reposed in the Grenadian monarch. As such, the Crown owns all state property; all public lands are vested in the governor-general, and are therefore called Crown lands. The government of Grenada is also formally referred to as His Majesty's Government in Grenada.

The functions of the head of state are exercised on the monarch's behalf by their representative, the governor-general of Grenada. However, certain ceremonial functions may be performed by the monarch while in Grenada. The constitution acknowledges the monarch's unrestricted discretion, as a matter of law, in the appointment or removal of the governor-general, but it is a settled constitutional convention that the monarch exercises these powers in accordance with the advice of the prime minister of Grenada.

All institutions of government act under the sovereign's authority; the vast powers that belong to the Grenadian Crown are collectively known as the Royal prerogative. Parliamentary approval is not required for the exercise of the Royal Prerogative; moreover, the consent of the Crown is required before either of the houses of parliament may even debate a bill affecting the sovereign's prerogatives or interests.

=== Executive ===
One of the main duties of the Crown is to appoint a prime minister, who thereafter heads the Cabinet of Grenada and advises the monarch or governor-general on how to execute their executive powers over all aspects of government operations and foreign affairs. The monarch's, and thereby the viceroy's role is almost entirely symbolic and cultural, acting as a symbol of the legal authority under which all governments and agencies operate, while the Cabinet directs the use of the Royal Prerogative, which includes the privilege to declare war, maintain the King's peace, as well as to summon and prorogue parliament and call elections. However, the Royal Prerogative belongs to the Crown and not to any of the ministers, though it might have sometimes appeared that way, and the constitution allows the governor-general to unilaterally use these powers in relation to the dismissal of a prime minister, dissolution of parliament, and removal of a judge in exceptional, constitutional crisis situations.

There are also a few duties which are specifically performed by the monarch, such as appointing the governor-general.

The governor-general, to maintain the stability of the government of Grenada, appoints as prime minister the individual most likely to maintain the support of the House of Representatives. The governor-general additionally appoints a Cabinet, at the direction of the prime minister. The monarch is informed by his viceroy of the acceptance of the resignation of a prime minister and the swearing-in of a new prime minister and other members of the ministry, and he remains fully briefed through regular communications from his Grenadian ministers. Members of various executive agencies and other officials are appointed by the Crown. The appointment of senators, magistrates, registrars and legal officers also falls under the Royal Prerogative.

=== Foreign affairs ===
The Royal Prerogative further extends to foreign affairs: the governor-general ratifies treaties, alliances, and international agreements. As with other uses of the Royal Prerogative, no parliamentary approval is required. However, a treaty cannot alter the domestic laws of Grenada; an Act of Parliament is necessary in such cases. The governor-general, on behalf of the monarch, also accredits Grenadian High Commissioners and ambassadors and receives diplomats from foreign states. In addition, the issuance of passports falls under the Royal Prerogative and, as such, all Grenadian passports are issued in the governor-general's name, the monarch's representative in the country.

=== Parliament ===
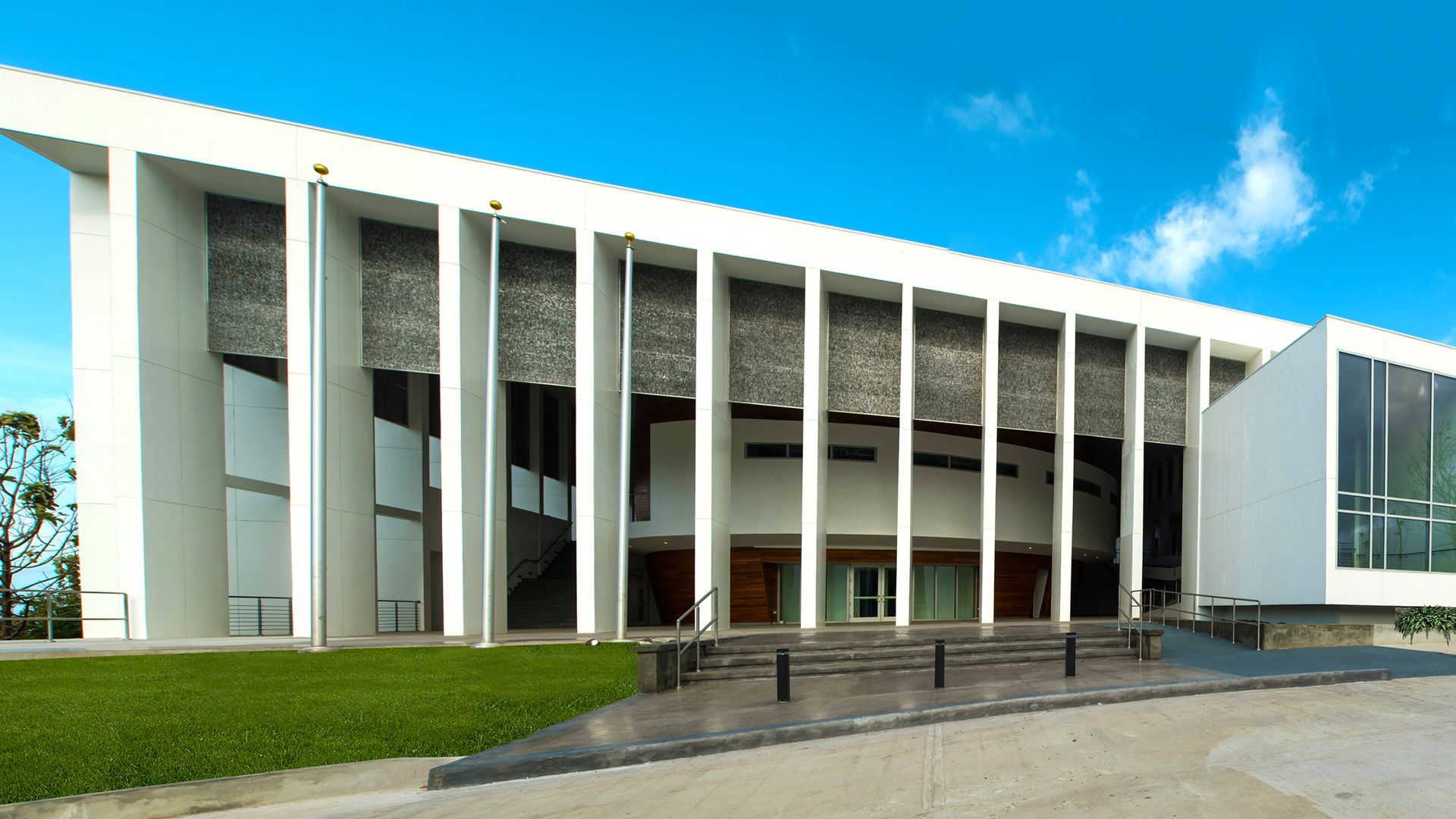
New Parliament Building, Grenada

The sovereign, along with the Senate and the House of Representatives, is one of the three components of the Parliament of Grenada. The authority of the Crown is embodied in the maces, which bear a crown at their apex. Grenada has two maces, one for the Senate (made in 1967), and one for the House of Representatives (made in the 18th century).

The monarch does not, however, participate in the legislative process; the viceroy does, though only in the granting of royal assent. Further, the constitution outlines that the governor-general alone is responsible for appointing senators. The viceroy must make seven senatorial appointments on the advice of the prime minister, three on the advice of leader of the opposition, and three on the advice of prime minister after the prime minister has consulted the organisations or interests which the senators would represent. There have been three instances, in 1999, 2013 and 2018, when Grenada did not have a formal parliamentary opposition, as the New National Party had won all seats in Parliament. On these occasions, the then governors-general acted on their own deliberate judgment to appoint members of the defeated National Democratic Congress to the Senate in order to provide opposition to government.

The viceroy additionally summons, prorogues, and dissolves parliament; after the latter, the writs for a general election are usually dropped by the governor-general at Government House, St George's. The new parliamentary session is marked by the Opening of Parliament, during which the monarch or the governor-general reads the Speech from the Throne.

I share my Government's desire to uphold and strengthen parliamentary democracy in Grenada and I am delighted to be here today to inaugurate this special session of the Third Parliament.

— Elizabeth II of Grenada, Speech from the Throne at York House, 31 October 1985

All laws in Grenada are enacted only with the viceroy's granting of royal assent in the monarch's name. Thus, bills begin with the phrase: "Be it enacted by the King's Most Excellent Majesty, by and with the advice and consent of the Senate and House of Representatives of Grenada, and by the authority of the same, as follows:". The royal assent, and proclamation, are required for all acts of parliament, usually granted or withheld by the governor-general, with the Public Seal of Grenada.

=== Courts ===
The sovereign is responsible for rendering justice for all his subjects, and is thus traditionally deemed the fount of justice. In Grenada, criminal offences are legally deemed to be offences against the sovereign and proceedings for indictable offences are brought in the sovereign's name in the form of The King [or Queen] versus [Name]. Hence, the common law holds that the sovereign "can do no wrong"; the monarch cannot be prosecuted in his or her own courts for criminal offences.

Magistrates are appointed by the governor-general, on the advice of the Judicial and Legal Services Commission, in line with section 88 of the Constitution. The Judicial and Legal Services Commission, under the Supreme Court Order of 1967, appoints Justices of the Supreme Court of Grenada and the West Indies Associated States on the monarch's behalf. The Chief Justice of the Court meanwhile is appointed by the monarch via letters patent. The highest court of appeal for Grenada is the Judicial Committee of the King's Privy Council.

The governor-general, on behalf of the Grenadian monarch, can also grant immunity from prosecution, exercise the royal prerogative of mercy, and pardon offences against the Crown, either before, during, or after a trial. The exercise of the 'Prerogative of mercy' to grant a pardon and the commutation of prison sentences is described in section 72 of the Constitution.

== Cultural role ==
=== The Crown and Honours ===
Badge of a Companion of the Order of Grenada featuring an effigy of Elizabeth II

Within the Commonwealth realms, the monarch is deemed the fount of honour. Similarly, the monarch, who sits at the apex of Grenada's honours system, confers awards and honours in Grenada in his name. Most of them are often awarded on the advice of "His Majesty's Grenada Ministers".

Through the passage of the National Honours and Awards Act in 2007, Grenada established two national orders, namely the Prestige Order of the National Hero and the Order of Grenada (which includes the Order of the Nation). The monarch serves as Sovereign of these orders, while their vice-regal representative, the governor-general, serves as the Chancellor.

=== The Crown and the Police Force ===
The national police force of Grenada is known as the "Royal Grenada Police Force".

The Crown sits at the pinnacle of the Royal Grenada Police Force, with the Commissioner of Police being appointed by the governor-general. St Edward's Crown appears on the police force's badges and rank insignia, which illustrates the monarchy as the locus of authority. Grenada's naval force, which falls under police control, is the Royal Grenada Coast Guard. Additionally, the prison service in Grenada is officially known as His Majesty's Prisons.

=== Grenadian royal symbols ===
The main symbol of the Grenadian monarchy is the sovereign himself. Thus, framed portraits of him are displayed in public buildings and government offices. The monarch also appears on commemorative Grenadian stamps. The coat of arms of Grenada, which was granted by royal warrant in 1973, features the royal helmet.

Queen Elizabeth II appears on all coins and banknotes of Grenada's currency, the Eastern Caribbean Dollar. The Monetary Council of the Eastern Caribbean Central Bank decided in 2023 however that the monarch will not be featured on future issues of the currency.

Crowned ceremonial maces are used in both the houses of Parliament to represent the royal authority of the sovereign. The mace of the House of Representatives features the emblems of the royal arms, while the mace of the Senate bears the royal cypher of Elizabeth II. A crown also appears on insignia of honours and police force officers, which illustrates the monarchy as the locus of authority.

God Save the King is the royal anthem of Grenada.

The King's Christmas message to the Commonwealth is broadcast by the Grenadian government on 25 December.

Flag of the Grenadian governor-general featuring St Edward's Crown

The insignia of the Order of the Nation featuring St Edward's Crown

The emblem of the Royal Grenada Police Force featuring St Edward's Crown

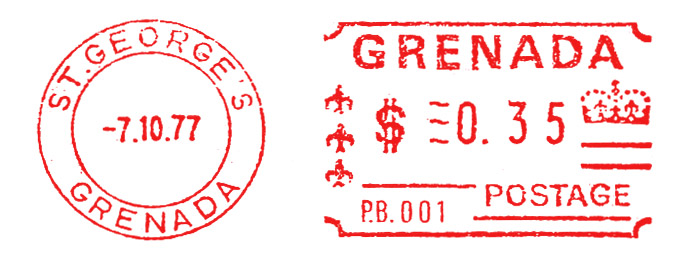
A Grenadian meter stamp featuring the Crown

The emblem of the Royal Grenada Coast Guard featuring St Edward's Crown

The emblem of His Majesty's Prison featuring St Edward's Crown

=== Royal visits ===
Princess Margaret visited Grenada in 1955.

Queen Elizabeth II first visited Grenada during her Caribbean tour of 1966. A Yachting Regatta was in progress in the harbour, and in St George's a Song of Welcome was sung by local children. The Queen later planted a tree, and viewed an agricultural exhibition and a variety performance. In 1985, the Queen opened Parliament in St George's and attended an investiture and a cultural presentation.

In the last few years, Grenada has been through momentous events and you have emerged with tremendous credit. As your Queen, I want to take this opportunity of congratulating the people of Grenada on the way you have prepared for and carried through the recent parliamentary elections which underlined your commitment to democracy. It has been a notable achievement and the world has watched with admiration.

— Elizabeth II of Grenada, 1985

The Earl of Wessex visited in October 2003 as trustee of The Duke of Edinburgh's Award International Association, and presented awards at the Rex Grenadian. The Earl of Wessex returned in November 2004 to visit some of the areas devastated by Hurricane Ivan.

The Duke of York visited Grenada in February 2004 and toured Dorothy Hopkins Home for the Handicapped and the Grenada Boys Secondary School, Saint George's.

The Princess Royal visited in June 2011 to present Gold Awards to young achievers in The Duke of Edinburgh's Award, and attended discussions as part of the Caribbean-Canada Emerging Leaders' Dialogue.

The Earl and Countess of Wessex visited in 2012 to mark the Queen's Diamond Jubilee. During their visit, the couple attended a youth rally, met students during an art exhibition, and unveiled a plaque at the Botanical Gardens.

The Princess Royal visited Grenada again in 2015 as President of the Caribbean-Canada Emerging Leaders' Dialogue and attended a panel discussion at St. George's University. The Princess afterwards attended The Duke of Edinburgh's International Award Grenada Awards Ceremony.

The Queen and Prince Philip have very, very fond memories of their visits here. Today I've been lucky enough to follow in their footsteps, and have met some remarkable organisations working to empower young people through sport.

— Prince Henry of Wales, 2016

Prince Harry visited Grenada in 2016, the year of the Queen's 90th birthday. Following his arrival at Grenada Cruise Port, the Prince travelled to Queens Park Grounds to attend a community sporting event, and later visited Grand Anse Beach to learn about the devastating impact of climate change. The Prince saw how coral gardeners were rebuilding the coral reef, and learnt about Grenada's efforts in restoring its mangroves, which were destroyed by Hurricane Ivan in 2004. During the visit, the Prince also launched the Royal Household Hospitality scholarships for aspiring hospitality workers from the Caribbean.

Charles, Prince of Wales and Camilla, Duchess of Cornwall visited Grenada during their Caribbean tour in 2019. The couple were welcomed with a ceremony at the Grenada Houses of Parliament, and attended a reception to view a variety of exhibitions, including flowers from the Chelsea Flower Show. At the House of Chocolate, the couple undertook a tour of the centre, tasting chocolate bars and cocoa tea, before meeting farmers and chocolatiers. Later, the couple visited the Carenage Exhibition and met the owner and operators of Renegade Rum. The Prince of Wales later attended a Blue Economy round table at Spice Island Beach Resort, and visited Mount Cinnamon Dive Site to view an exposition on the Blue Economy on the beach.

The Earl and Countess of Wessex were due to visit Grenada in 2022 to mark the Queen's Platinum Jubilee, but their tour was postponed after talks with the island's government and governor-general. It was reported that representatives of Grenada's National Reparations Committee had planned to meet the couple and discuss Britain and the royal family's past links to slavery in the region.

== Public opinion ==
In the 2016 Grenadian constitutional referendum a proposal to replace the King's Privy Council as Grenada's court of final appeal, and remove references to the monarch from the oath of allegiance, was rejected by 56.7% of voters. A second referendum on replacing the Privy Council, held in 2018, was also rejected, this time by 55.2% of voters.

In 2023, the Grenada National Reparations Committee urged the government to start the process of initiating a national conversation on becoming a republic. Ahead of the Coronation of King Charles III in 2023, Prime Minister Dickon Mitchell expressed his hope that the transition would happen during his leadership, while a poll by Lord Ashcroft the same month found that 56% of Grenadians supported Grenada remaining a monarchy, against 42% who supported a republic.

An unincorporated non-profit organisation, the Grenada Monarchist League, was established in February 2024 with the goal of promoting and educating about the Grenadian monarchy. The organisation operates as a voluntary association and has been involved in public campaigns in favour of the preservation of the monarchy and other monarchic symbols, such as the oath of allegiance to the King.

In July 2025, the Parliament of Grenada unanimously passed the Constitution (Oath of Allegiance) (Amendment) (No. 1) Act, 2025 and the Constitution (Oath of Allegiance) (Amendment) (No. 2) Act, 2025, which were assented to by Governor-General Dame Cécile La Grenade on 31 July 2025. These acts amended the oath and affirmation of allegiance, removing the mention of the monarch, his heirs and successors. From 1 August 2025, state officials were required to take an oath or affirmation of allegiance to "Grenada", with existing officials mandated to retake the oath within 12 hours of the commencement of the acts or within seven days of the appointed day. In a statement, Prime Minister Dickon Mitchell said, "Sovereign countries have excellent bilateral relations. That doesn’t mean that you have to swear allegiance to the head of a state of another foreign country".

== List of Grenadian monarchs ==
| Portrait | Regnal name (Birth–Death) | Reign over Grenada | | Full name | Consort | House |
| Portrait | Regnal name (Birth–Death) | Start | End | Full name | Consort | House |
|---|---|---|---|---|---|---|
| | Elizabeth II (1926–2022) | 7 February 1974 | 8 September 2022 | Elizabeth Alexandra Mary | Philip Mountbatten | Windsor |
| | Elizabeth II (1926–2022) | Governors-general: Sir Leo de Gale, Sir Paul Scoon, Sir Reginald Palmer, Sir Daniel Williams, Sir Carlyle Glean, Dame Cécile La Grenade; Prime ministers: Sir Eric Gairy, Maurice Bishop, Bernard Coard, General Hudson Austin, Sir Nicholas Brathwaite, Herbert Blaize, Ben Jones, George Brizan, Keith Mitchell, Tillman Thomas, Dickon Mitchell | | | | |
| | Charles III (b. 1948) | 8 September 2022 | present | Charles Philip Arthur George | Camilla Shand | Windsor |
| | Charles III (b. 1948) | Governors-general: Dame Cécile La Grenade; Prime ministers: Dickon Mitchell | | | | |

== See also ==
- Lists of office-holders
- List of prime ministers of Elizabeth II
- List of prime ministers of Charles III
- List of Commonwealth visits made by Elizabeth II
- Monarchies in the Americas
- List of monarchies
