= Grenada Monarchist League =

Organisation promoting the monarchy of Grenada

- Chairman: Unknown
- Founded: 7 February 2024
- Headquarters: St. George's, Grenada
- Ideology: Monarchism (Grenadian)
- Slogan: For the Advancement and Defence of the Nutmeg Crown.

Website
- www.grenadamonarchist.org

The Grenada Monarchist League (GML) is an unincorporated nonprofit organisation in Grenada, promoting and educating on the Grenadian monarchy and Constitution. The organisation was founded on 7 February 2024, in response to increased pressures of republicanism among politicians in Grenada following the death of Queen Elizabeth II and the country's Golden Jubilee of independence.

== Structure ==
The Grenada Monarchist League is an unincorporated nonprofit organisation. The organisation is independent and non-partisan, not being formally associated with any political party or other organisation. It has no paid staff, relying on volunteers to keep the group operating. The organisation is governed by a General Assembly consisting of all registered members of the league. An Executive Council comprising a chairman, deputy chairman, Head of Diaspora Affairs, and appointed Executive Councillors is tasked with the day-to-day operations of the organisation. The chairman, deputy chairman and Head of Diaspora Affairs are elected by the General Assembly, while Executive Councillors are appointed by the chairman, but may be removed by the General Assembly.

The X account of the league is based in Europe.

== Activities ==
=== Oath of Allegiance debate ===
Ahead of the Golden Jubilee of Grenadian Independence in February 2024, proposals to amend the Grenadian Oath of Allegiance were put forward by a group of Grenadian lawyers, led by the Citizens for Constitution Reform (CCR), convened by Dr. Francis Alexis. The proposed changes aimed to remove references to the monarch from the oath without holding a referendum, redirecting allegiance to the State of Grenada. A similar proposal to remove monarchic references from the oath had previously been rejected by 56.7% of voters in the 2016 Grenadian constitutional referendum.

The Grenada Monarchist League's first public actions following its establishment entailed a public campaign against the proposed changes to the oath. The league condemned suggestions that the oath, as it stood, was to the “British monarch” and that it represented a lack of sovereignty and subordination to the United Kingdom. It accused prominent proponents of the change of spreading misinformation about the oath and the monarchy, and called on the government to drop any potential plans to amend the constitution. The league further campaigned by directly contacting Prime Minister Dickon Mitchell and all the members of the House of Representatives, encouraging its members to do the same.

Despite the League's efforts, the Lower House and Upper House approved The Constitution (Oath of Allegiance) (Amendment) (No. 1) Act, 2025, and The Constitution (Oath of Allegiance) (Amendment) (No. 2) Act, 2025, on 24 and 25 July 2025, respectively. Governor-General Dame Cécile La Grenade assented to the bills on 31 July 2025, with the changes taking effect on 1 August 2025, redirecting the Oath of Allegiance and Affirmation of Allegiance to the State of Grenada.

=== Reforming appointment process of the Governor-General ===
A prominent objective of the league is the reform of the appointment process of the Governor-General, who is currently appointed by the King on the advice of the Grenadian Prime Minister. The league has proposed the establishment of a Privy Council for Grenada, which is to act as the body to advise the King on vice-regal appointments, as well as act as advisors to the Governor-General.

For the purposes of this proposed reform, the league presented to the government a legislative proposal, the Privy Council (Establishment) Bill, in March 2024. The bill would establish a "Privy Council for Grenada to act as a body to advise His Majesty and the Governor-General". The proposed body would advise on vice-regal appointments by unanimous consent, and would consist of the Prime Minister, Leader of His Majesty's Opposition, the Minister for Carriacou and Petite Martinique, the Chair of the Public Service Commission, a judge, and 2 members appointed by the Governor-General.

The proposal faced some criticism on the basis that it was unnecessary given the ceremonial status of the Governor-General. The league reiterated its calls on the government to implement the proposed bill, pointing to the important constitutional roles vested in the Governor-General, which give it important powers far beyond ceremonial duties.

=== Education campaign ===
Other activities include educating and spreading awareness of the constitutional and ceremonial roles of the monarchy in Grenada, and dispelling misconceptions about its position. In particular, the group objects to referring to the monarchy in regards to Grenada as the "British monarchy", pointing to its formal independent status under the Statute of Westminster as the "Grenadian monarchy"

The league maintains an extensive overview of the monarchy's historic and political relationship with Grenada, seeking to educate Grenadians about why the monarchy matters and how it impacts governance.

== Membership ==
The organisation has an undisclosed number of full and honorary members. Full membership is open and free to all Grenadians both resident in the country and in the diaspora, while non-Grenadians are accepted as honorary members.

== See also ==
- Constitutional monarchy
- 2018 Grenadian constitutional referendum
- Commonwealth realms
