= Government House, Grenada =

Official residence of the governor-general of Grenada in Saint George's

Government House
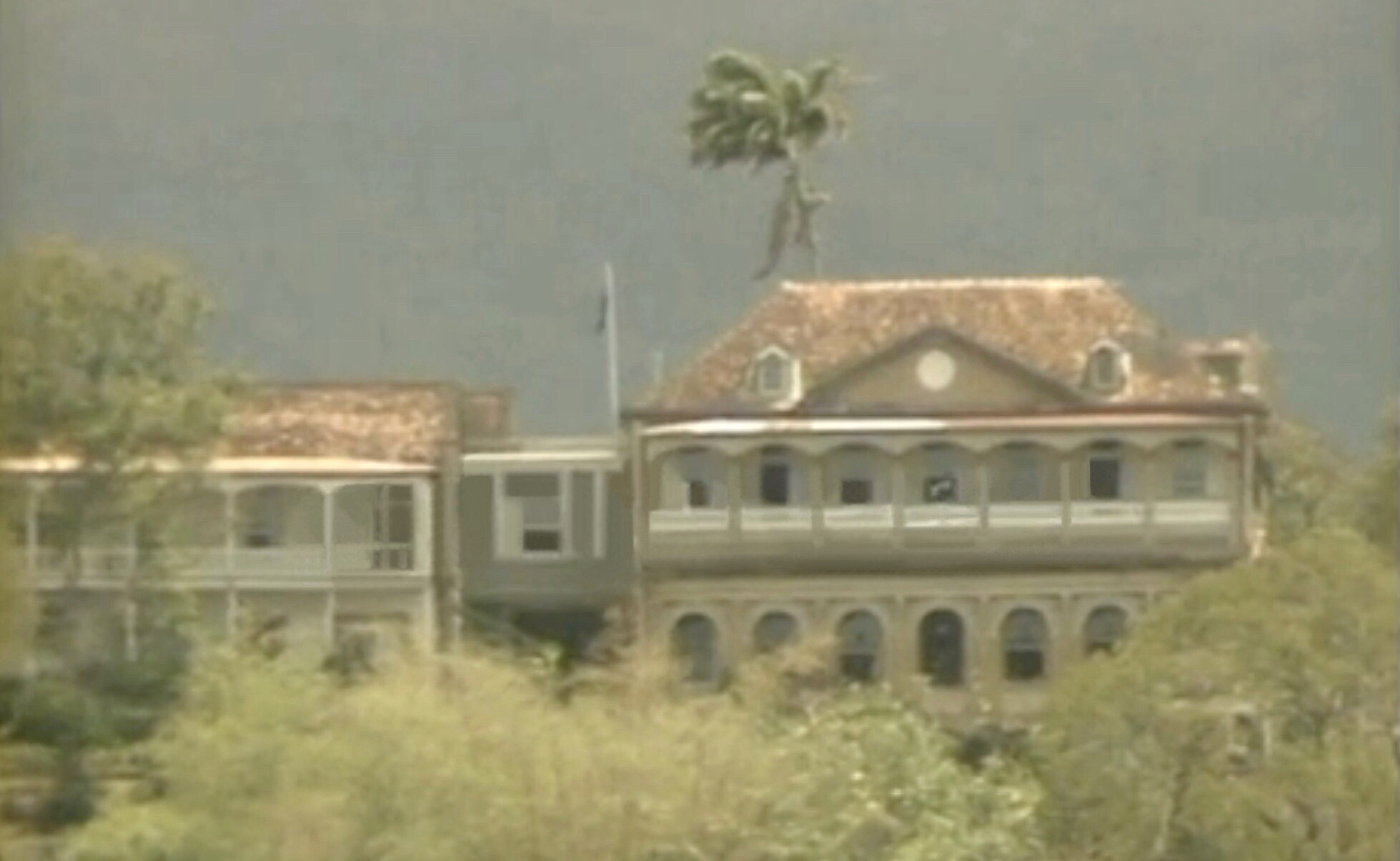
- Government House in 1984

General information
- Type: Official residence
- Architectural style: British colonial
- Location: Mount Wheldale, Saint George's, Grenada
- Coordinates: 12.05338°N 61.74370°W
- Completed: 1780
- Renovated: 1886
- Destroyed: 2004
- Owner: Government of Grenada

Government House is the former official residence of the governor-general of Grenada. The house is located on Mount Wheldale, in Saint George's. It is located next to New Parliament House. The building was damaged by Hurricane Ivan in 2004 and subsequently abandoned.

== History ==
The house on the site was originally an estate house owned by William Lucas, which was used as the headquarters of the French administration during the 1779–1783 occupation. Following the return to British rule, the building became the new residence of Governor Edward Mathew, and was formally purchased by the Grenada government in 1785. The building was extensively remodelled in 1886 by Governor Sir Walter Sendall.

It was used as the home and office of the lieutenant-governors of Grenada until 1882. After this, it briefly became the residence of the administrators of the island, before Saint George's became the capital of the Windward Islands in 1885, whereupon it was occupied by the governor-in-chief. The building became home to the administrators again in 1959 upon the dissolution of the Windward Islands. Following the granting of full internal self-government in 1967 it became residence of the governor of Grenada. When Grenada became an independent state in 1974 it became the residence of the governors-general, until destroyed by Hurricane Ivan in 2004.

It was used as a set piece during the filming of Island in the Sun in 1956. During the United States invasion of Grenada in 1983 the house was the site of a 24-hour battle between US Navy SEALs sent to evacuate Governor-General Sir Paul Scoon and the Grenadian People's Revolutionary Army.

== Rebuilding effort ==
The building has since 2004 fallen into ruin. The office and residence of the governor-general has since been relocated to a residence in Point Salines. Various society groups have advocated for the restoration of the residence, including the Willie Redhead Foundation. Active effort is being made, particularly by Governor-General Dame Cecile La Grenade, to raise funds for the restoration of the building.

== See also ==
- Government Houses of the British Empire and Commonwealth
- Governor-General of Grenada
- Monarchy of Grenada
