= List of Grenadian flags =

This is a list of flags used in Grenada in the Caribbean.

== National flag ==
| Flag | Date | Use | Description |
|---|---|---|---|
| | 1974–present | Flag of Grenada | A rectangle divided diagonally into two yellow triangles at the top and bottom and two green triangles at the hoist and fly, surrounded by a red border charged with six five pointed yellow stars, another five-pointed yellow star on a red disc at the centre, and a nutmeg fruit at the hoist. |

== Royal and Viceregal flags ==
| Flag | Date | Use | Description |
|---|---|---|---|
| | 1974–present | Flag of the governor-general of Grenada | A lion standing on a St. Edward's crown, with the name "Grenada" below. |
| | 1974–2022 | Personal flag of Queen Elizabeth II | The flag is the crowned letter 'E' in gold, surrounded by a garland of gold roses on a blue background, with a golden fringe. The crown is a symbol of the Queen's rank and dignity, whilst the roses symbolise the countries of the Commonwealth. |

== Dependency flag ==
| Flag | Date | Use | Description |
|---|---|---|---|
| | 1974–present | Flag of Carriacou and Petite Martinique | A rectangle divided diagonally into two yellow triangles at the top and bottom, one green triangle on the hoist side and one black triangle on the fly side with a five-pointed yellow star each, surrounded by a red border and another five-pointed yellow star on a red disc at the centre. |

== Military flags ==
| Flag | Date | Use | Description |
|---|---|---|---|
| | 1974–present | Civil ensign of Grenada | A longer variant of the national flag. |
| | 1974–present | Naval ensign of Grenada | A white field with a red cross and the national flag in the canton. |

== Historical flags ==
| Flag | Date | Use | Description |
|---|---|---|---|
| | 1498–1500 | Royal flag of the Crown of Castile | A quartered heraldical field of Castile, represented by a castle, and León, represented by a lion. |
| | 1500–1516 | Royal flag of the Crown of Castile | A rectangular variant of the previous flag. |
| | 1516–1609; 1609–1650 | The Spanish Cross of Burgundy | A red saltire resembling two crossed, roughly-pruned (knotted) branches, on a white field. |
| | 1650–1762; 1779–1783 | Flag of the Kingdom of France | A white field with several fleurs-de-lis and the Royal Arms in the centre. |
| | 1609 | Flag of the Kingdom of England | A white field with centred red cross. |
| | 1762–1779; 1783–1801 | Flag of the Kingdom of Great Britain | A superimposition of the flags of England and Scotland. |
| | 1801–1967 | The Union Jack | A superimposition of the flags of England and Scotland with the Saint Patrick's Saltire (representing the Kingdom of Ireland). |
| | 1886–1903 | Flag of the British Windward Islands | A Blue Ensign with the badge of the Governor-in-chief in the fly. |
| | 1886–1903 | Flag of the governor of the British Windward Islands | A Union Jack defaced with the badge of the Governor-in-chief. |
| | 1903–1953 | Flag of the British Windward Islands | A Blue Ensign with the badge of the Governor-in-chief in the fly. |
| | 1903–1953 | Flag of the governor of the British Windward Islands | A Union Jack defaced with the badge of the Governor-in-chief. |
| | 1953–1958 | Flag of the British Windward Islands | A Blue Ensign with the badge of the Governor-in-chief in the fly. |
| | 1953–1958 | Flag of the governor of the British Windward Islands | A Union Jack defaced with the badge of the Governor-in-chief. |
| | 1958–1962 | Flag of the West Indies Federation | A blue field with four horizontal narrow white wavy stripes with a large orange-gold circle over the middle two lines in the center of the flag. The top two wavy stripes are a mirror image of the bottom two. |
| | 1958–1962 | Flag of the governor-general of the West Indies Federation | A lion standing on a St. Edward's crown, with the name "The West Indies" below. |
| | 1875–1903 | Flag of British Grenada | A Blue Ensign defaced with the first colonial badge of Grenada. |
| | 1903–1967 | Flag of British Grenada | A Blue Ensign defaced with the second colonial badge of Grenada. |
| | 1967–1974 | Flag of Grenada | A horizontal tricolour of blue, yellow, and green bands, with a sprig of nutmeg on a white oval at the centre. |
| | 1967–1974 | Flag of the governor of Grenada | A Union Jack defaced with the emblem of Grenada. |

== See also ==
- Flag of Grenada
- Coat of arms of Grenada
