= Order of the National Hero (Grenada) =

Highest honour of Grenada

Prestige Order of the National Hero
- Badge of the order

Awarded by the Monarch of Grenada
- Type: Order of chivalry
- Established: 2007
- Eligibility: Any citizen of Grenada
- Awarded for: Outstanding service which has altered history or heroic exploits and sacrifice for Grenada
- Status: Currently constituted
- Sovereign: Charles III
- Chancellor (ex officio): Cecile La Grenade

Precedence
- Next (higher): None
- Next (lower): Order of the Nation
- Ribbon of the order

The Prestige Order of the National Hero is an order of chivalry and a society of honour instituted through the National Honours and Awards Act which having been passed by the House of Representatives of Grenada on 16 November 2007 and passed by the Senate of Grenada on 27 November 2007, received Royal Assent on 31 December 2007. Members are accorded the style "The Right Excellent".

King Charles III is the sovereign of the order in his capacity as King of Grenada. Appointments to the order are made by governor-general of Grenada, as chancellor, who acts on the advice of the prime minister of Grenada and the National Heroes Commission.

Awards are usually announced each year on the occasion of the National Day of Grenada - 7 February.

== National Heroes ==
- Sir Eric Gairy (1922–1997)
