= Anthony C. George =

Grenadian artist (1938–2024)

Anthony C. George BEM
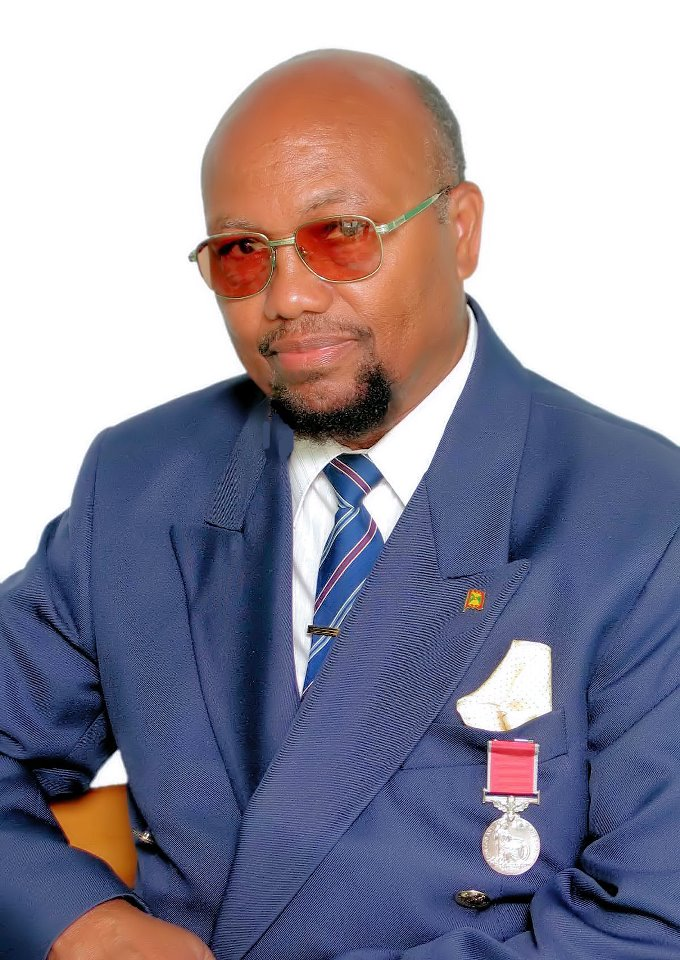
- A. C. George with British Empire Medal
- Born: Anthony Conrad George; 7 January 1938; Carriacou, Grenada, British Windward Islands
- Died: 7 February 2024 (aged 86); United Kingdom
- Known for: Painting, Drawing, Photography
- Notable work: Flag of Grenada (1973)
- Website: www.acgeorge.com

Anthony Conrad George BEM (7 January 1938 – 7 February 2024) was a Grenadian artist known for being the designer of the Grenadian national flag. He resided in both London, England, and in mainland Grenada, where he grew up from the age of 10.

A prolific artist, in 1973 George entered a national design contest preparing for the independence of Grenada in 1974. The contest allowed entrants to submit designs for a new national flag and coat of arms with a motto, George won both competitions.

However, he did not receive full recognition for his designs until 30 years later.

== Early life and education ==
George was born the second of five children of Florence Stiell and John Soloman George in L'Esterre, Carriacou, a small Island just off the coast of Grenada. He attended his aunt's private school up to the age of 10, then he moved with his parents to mainland Grenada in 1948 to continue his education at the St. Andrew's Roman Catholic school. In 1959, he migrated in pursuit of higher education to England, where he attended various colleges and polytechnic institutions. After his graduation in education, fine and commercial arts he returned to Grenada in 1969 where he taught at St. Joseph's Convent and other schools in St. George's, as well as Paraclete Government School in the parish.

== Community and charitable work ==
In September 1973, he was assigned to the Independence Secretariat to serve on four committees in preparation for the forthcoming Independence of Grenada in 1974.

1991 saw George serving Grenada as senior sales representative for the UK and Europe.

In 1992, he served as executive manager with the Ministry of Works, on the Eastern Main Road Project, funded by the European Union. In Grenada, he dedicated his time to serving the community through various charitable organizations; including The Society of St. Vincent de Paul and The Rotary Club. He also served on every committee of The St. Andrew's Development Organization (SADO).

== Recognition ==
In the 2007 New Year Honours, George was awarded the British Empire Medal (BEM) for services to art and culture.

In 2009, Mrs. Patricia Antoine-Clyne, Accountant General in the Ministry of Finance, and the Chairperson of The Grenada Postal Corporation, arranged for commemorative stamps to be made in George's honour in time for the 35th celebrations of Grenada's Independence.

In April that year, Anthony C George was invited to a reception at Buckingham Palace by the Queen in commemoration of the 60th Anniversary of the Commonwealth.

On 6 February 2012, a street in Soubise, St Andrew Parish was named A.C George Road in Anthony's honour.

In August 2012, George received the Diamond Jubilee Medal from the Governor-General in Grenada for Community Services and Nation Building.

On 21 October 2013, George and the High Commissioner of Grenada presented Crawley Museum with flags and gifts to commemorate the town's first St George's Day Parade.

George was the honoured guest of Houston, Texas, in their 40th celebrations of Grenadian Independence on 8 February 2014. He was designated guest speaker at the 3rd annual Scholarship Gala of the Grenada Houston Association, he was also awarded the prestigious honour of the "Heroism Award". The Grenada Houston Association have also proposed a scholarship fund in his name.

== Personal life and death ==
George was married with five children and five grandchildren. In October 2013 he published his memoirs, Beyond Belief. George died in the United Kingdom on 7 February 2024, at the age of 86.
