= Hilda Bynoe =

Governor of Grenada (1921-2013)

Dame Hilda Bynoe DBE

Governor of Grenada
- In office June 1968 – 21 January 1974
- Monarch: Queen Elizabeth II
- Premier: Eric Gairy
- Preceded by: Ian Turbott
- Succeeded by: Sir Leo de Gale

Personal details
- Born: Hilda Louisa Gibbs; 18 November 1921 Crochu, Grenada, West Indies
- Died: 6 April 2013 (aged 91) Trinidad and Tobago
- Spouse: Peter Cecil Alexander Bynoe
- Children: 2
- Occupation: teacher, doctor

Dame Hilda Louisa Bynoe, DBE (née Gibbs; 18 November 1921 – 6 April 2013) was the Governor of Grenada between 1968 and 1974.

A doctor and hospital administrator, Bynoe was, so far, the only woman to have been a governor of one of the British Dependencies, Hilda Bynoe was the first woman Governor of a Commonwealth of Nations country, becoming Governor of Grenada, Carriacou and Petite Martinique. She spent most of her adult life as a teacher and doctor of medicine in Trinidad and Tobago.

== Early life and career ==
Born in Crochu, Grenada, West Indies, Bynoe was educated at the village school, where her father, Thomas Joseph Gibbs, was headmaster and where her mother, sister and aunts had at one time or the other been teachers, and at St. Joseph's Convent, the island's only Roman Catholic Secondary School for girls. The first few years of adulthood were spent as a teacher at the Convent of St. Joseph in San Fernando, Trinidad, and later at Bishop Anstey High School in Port of Spain, Trinidad, as a science student. In 1944 she left for Europe to study Medicine and graduated from the University of London's Royal Free Hospital, then the London School of Medicine for Women, in 1951.

== Governor of Grenada ==
In June 1968, she was appointed Governor of Grenada, the first woman governor in the British Commonwealth and the first Grenada native to occupy the post. She was appointed a Dame Commander of the Order of the British Empire by Queen Elizabeth II in 1969.

In January 1974, following demonstrations calling for her resignation, Bynoe made a speech over the radio calling for public support. The Prime Minister, Eric Gairy, advised the Queen to dismiss Bynoe, accusing Bynoe of attempting to undermine the Premier's authority to recommend the appointment and dismissal of governors. Bynoe then requested permission to retire from the Queen, which was granted.

== Personal life ==
Hilda Bynoe met and married Peter Cecil Alexander Bynoe, a Trinidadian RAF Officer; they had two sons, Roland and Michael. The Bynoe family returned to the West Indies in 1953 and Hilda Bynoe served in Guyana and Trinidad for the next fifteen years.

In 1990, she retired to continue her writing and to assist in the care of her granddaughters Olukemi and Nandi. She continued as Patroness of several organizations, including the Caribbean College of Family Physicians, the John Hayes Memorial Kidney Foundation and the Caribbean Women’s Association. She died, aged 91, in Trinidad. Her younger sister was Rosalind Howells, Baroness Howells of St Davids, who was a member of the House of Lords from 1999 until 2019.

Government offices
| Preceded by Ian Turbott | Governor of Grenada; 1968–1974 | Succeeded by Leo de Gale |
