= Governor-General of Grenada =

Representative of the monarch

- Coat of arms of Grenada

- Flag of the governor-general

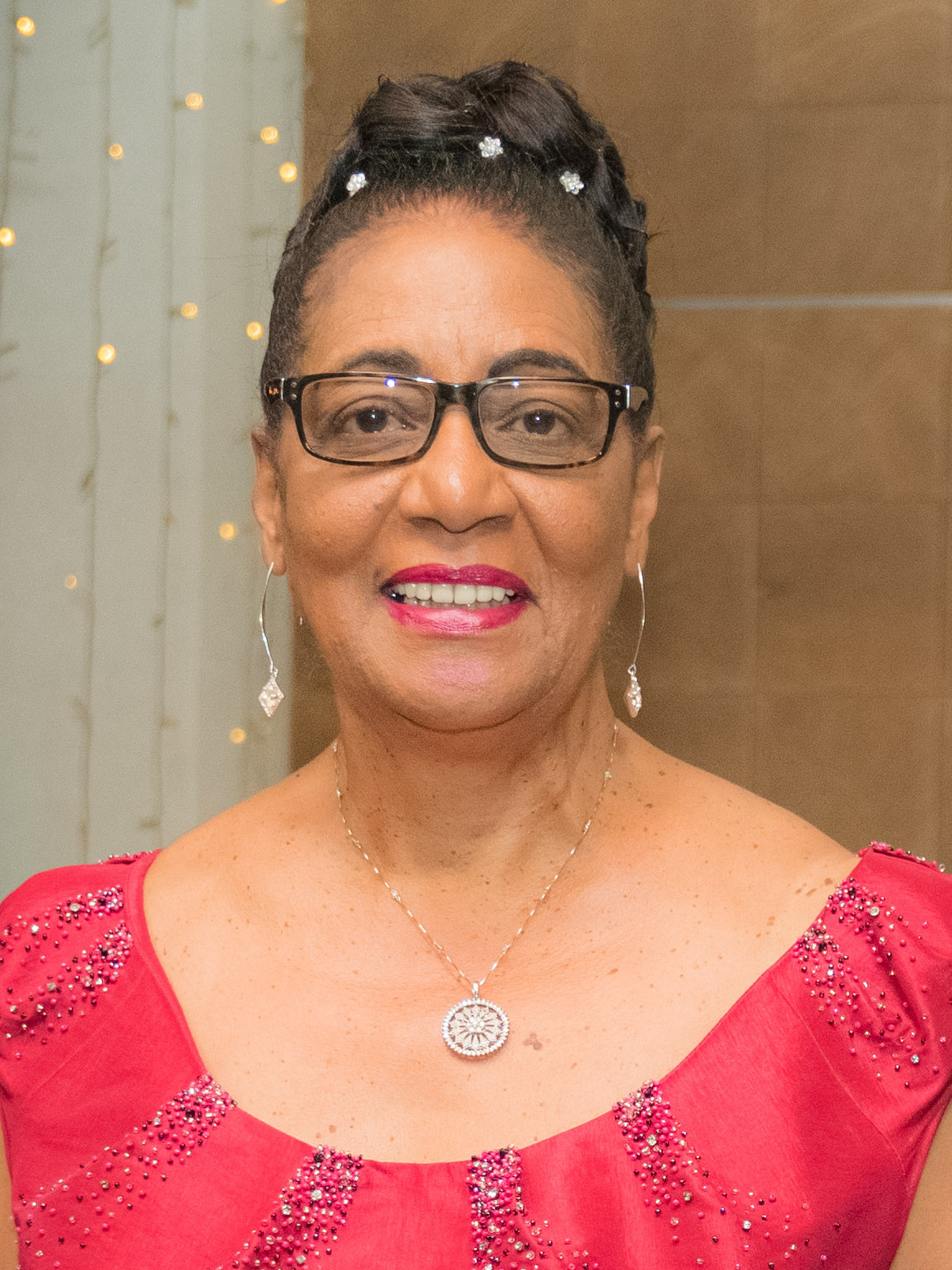
- Incumbent; Dame Cécile La Grenade since 7 May 2013
- Viceroy
- Style: Her Excellency
- Residence: Governor-General’s House, Point Salines, St. George's
- Appointer: Monarch of Grenada on the advice of the prime minister
- Term length: At His Majesty's pleasure
- Constituting instrument: Constitution of Grenada
- Formation: 7 February 1974
- First holder: Sir Leo de Gale
- Salary: EC$ 148,539 annually
- Website: Office of the Governor-General

The governor-general of Grenada is the representative of the Grenadian monarch, currently King Charles III, in Grenada. The governor-general is appointed by the monarch on the recommendation of the prime minister of Grenada. The functions of the governor-general include appointing ministers, judges, and ambassadors; giving Royal Assent to legislation passed by the Grenadian Parliament; and issuing writs for election.

In general, the governor-general observes the conventions of the Westminster system and responsible government, maintaining a political neutrality, and has to always act only on the advice of the prime minister. The governor-general also has a ceremonial role: hosting events at the official vice-regal residence in the capital, St. George's— and bestowing honours to individuals and groups who are contributing to Grenada and to their communities. When travelling abroad, the governor-general is seen as the representative of Grenada and its monarch.

Governors-general formally serve "at the monarch's pleasure". Since 7 May 2013, the governor-general has been Dame Cécile La Grenade.

The office of the governor-general was created on 7 February 1974, when Grenada gained independence from the United Kingdom as a sovereign state and an independent constitutional monarchy. Since then, 6 individuals have served as governor-general.

== Appointment ==
The governor-general is formally appointed by the monarch of Grenada. When a new governor-general is to be appointed, the prime minister recommends a name to the monarch, who by convention accepts that recommendation. At the installation ceremony, the new governor-general takes an Oath of Allegiance and Office.

== Functions ==
Grenada shares the person of the sovereign equally with 14 other countries in the Commonwealth of Nations. As the sovereign works and resides predominantly outside of Grenadian borders, the governor-general's primary task is to perform the monarch's constitutional duties on his or her behalf. As such, the governor-general carries out his or her functions in the government of Grenada on behalf and in the name of the Sovereign, but is not involved in the day-to day running of the government.

The governor-general's powers and roles are derived from the Grenadian constitution's Section 19 to 22, which set out certain provisions relating to the governor-general.

=== Constitutional role ===
The governor-general is responsible for summoning, proroguing, and dissolving parliament and issues writs for new elections. After an election, the governor-general formally requests the leader of the political party which gains the support of a majority in parliament to form a government. The governor-general commissions the prime minister and appoints other ministers after the election.

The governor-general, on the Sovereign's behalf, gives royal assent to laws passed by the Parliament of Grenada.

The governor-general also appoints state judges, ministers, ambassadors and high commissioners to overseas countries, and other senior government officials.

The governor-general may, in certain circumstances, exercise without – or contrary to – ministerial advice. These are known as the reserve powers, and include:

- appointing a prime minister if an election has resulted in a 'hung parliament'.
- dismissing the prime minister who has lost the confidence of the parliament.
- dismissing any minister acting unlawfully.
- refusing to dissolve the House of Representatives despite a request from the prime minister.

=== Ceremonial role ===
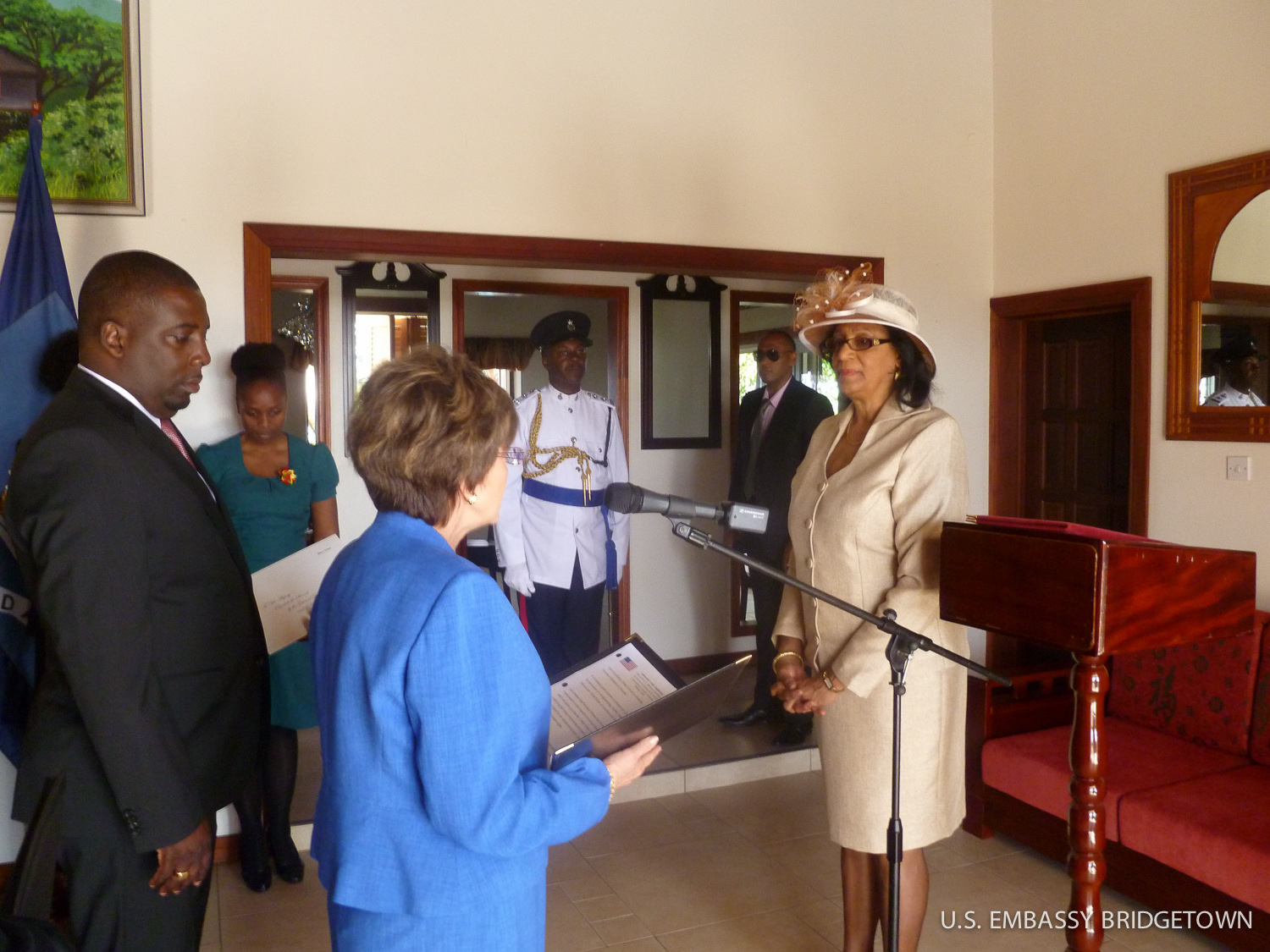
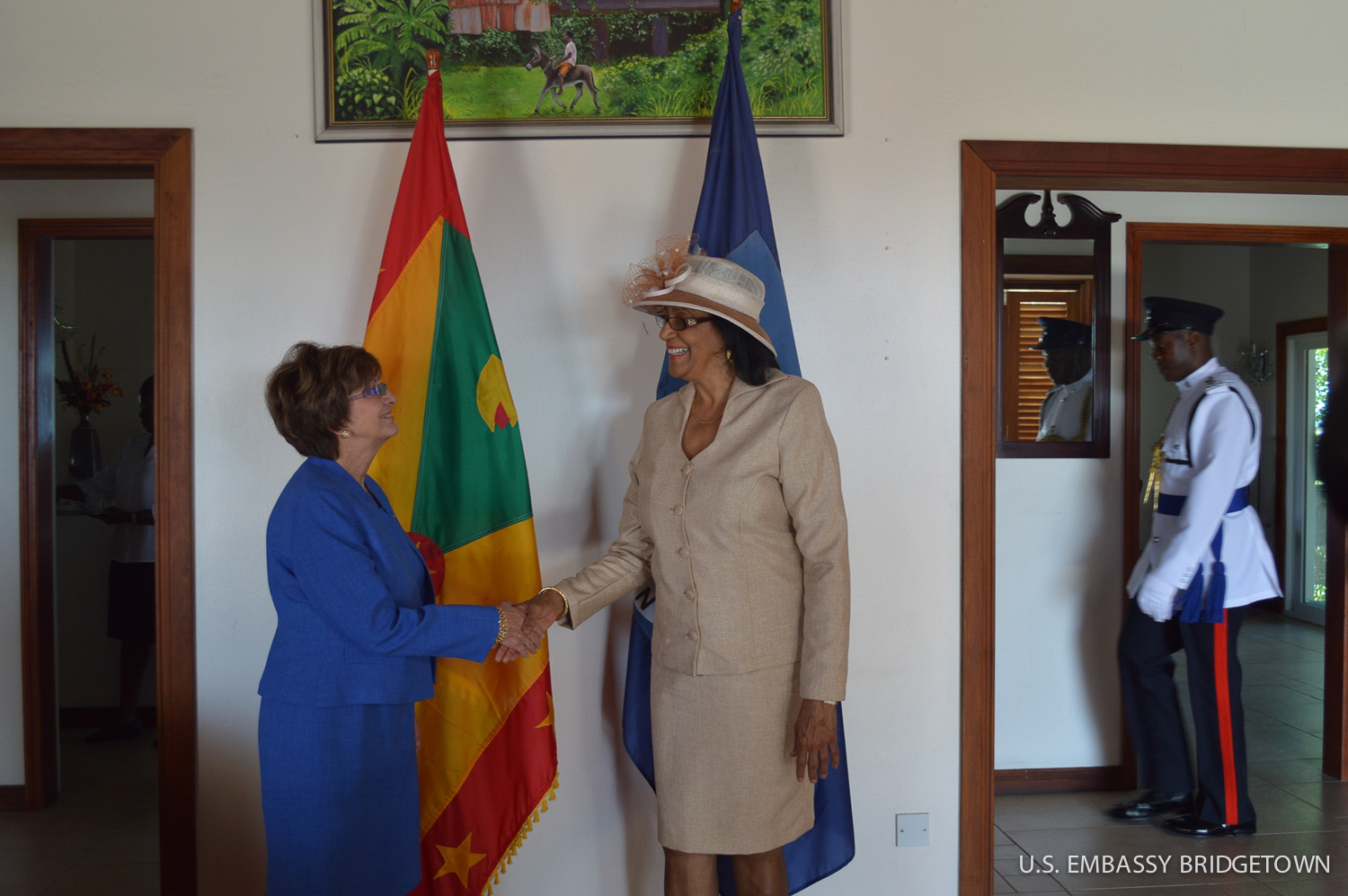
US Ambassador to Grenada Linda Swartz Taglialatela presenting her credentials to Governor-General Cecile La Grenade

The governor-general's ceremonial duties include opening new sessions of parliament by delivering the Speech from the Throne, welcoming visiting heads of state, and receiving the credentials of foreign diplomats.

The governor-general serves as Chancellor of Grenada's two national orders: the Order of Grenada (within this the Order of the Nation), and Order of the National Hero. As such, the governor-general is responsible for appointing members to these orders. Such honours and awards, in addition to honours bestowed directly by the monarch, are presented by the governor-general at investitures at Governor-General's House, St George's. In 2023, Governor-General Dame Cecile La Grenade carried out the first investiture ceremony outside of the vice-regal residence in history, when she travelled to the island of Petite Martinique for a special investiture ceremony.

=== Community role ===
The governor-general provides non-partisan leadership in the community, acting as patron of many charitable, service, sporting and cultural organisations, and attending functions throughout the country. The governor-general serves as patron of several organizations including Grenada Red Cross Society, the Grenada National Council of the Disabled, the Grenada Yacht Club, the Grenada Amateur Radio Club, and the Grenada Society for the Prevention of Cruelty to Animals. The governor-general is also president of the Grenada Council of the Order of Saint John.

The governor-general also encourages, articulates and represents those things that unite Grenadians together. In this role, the governor-general:

- attends charitable, social, and civic events across the country.
- accepts patronage of many national, charitable, cultural, educational, sporting and professional organisations.
- visits and gives speeches at non-governmental organisations.

== Privileges ==
=== Salary ===
The governor-general receives an annual salary of EC$ 148,539.

=== Symbols ===
Flag of the governor-general of Grenada

The governor-general uses a personal flag, which features a lion passant atop a St. Edward's royal crown with "Grenada" written on a scroll underneath, all on a blue background. It is flown on buildings and other locations in Grenada to mark the governor-general's presence.

=== Residence ===
Government House in St. George's was the official residence of the governor-general of Grenada. Since Government House was destroyed by Hurricane Ivan in 2004, the governor-general has resided in a residence in Point Salines, south of the capital.

== List of governors-general ==
Following is a list of people who have served as governor-general of Grenada since independence in 1974.

Denotes Acting Governors-General

No.	Portrait	Name (Birth–Death)	Term of office			Monarch (Reign)
No.	Portrait	Name (Birth–Death)	Took office	Left office	Time in office	Monarch (Reign)
1		Sir Leo de Gale (1921–1986)	7 February 1974	4 October 1978	4 years, 239 days	Elizabeth II (1974–2022)
2		Sir Paul Scoon (1935–2013)	4 October 1978	31 July 1992	13 years, 301 days	Elizabeth II (1974–2022)
–		Reginald Palmer (1923–2016); Acting Governor-General	31 July 1992	6 August 1992	6 days	Elizabeth II (1974–2022)
3		Sir Reginald Palmer (1923–2016)	6 August 1992	8 August 1996	4 years, 2 days	Elizabeth II (1974–2022)
4		Sir Daniel Williams (1935–2024)	8 August 1996	18 November 2008	12 years, 102 days	Elizabeth II (1974–2022)
Vacant (18 – 27 November 2008)						Elizabeth II (1974–2022)
5		Sir Carlyle Glean (1932–2021)	27 November 2008	7 May 2013	4 years, 161 days	Elizabeth II (1974–2022)
6		Dame Cécile La Grenade (b. 1952)	7 May 2013	Incumbent	13 years, 123 days	
6		Dame Cécile La Grenade (b. 1952)	7 May 2013	Incumbent	13 years, 123 days	Charles III (2022–present)

== See also ==
- List of heads of government of Grenada
