= Flag of Grenada =

Grenada
- Use: National flag
- Proportion: 3:5
- Adopted: 7 February 1974; 52 years ago
- Design: A rectangle divided diagonally into two yellow triangles at the top and bottom and two green triangles at the hoist and fly, surrounded by a red border charged with six five pointed yellow stars, another five-pointed yellow star on a red disc at the centre, and a nutmeg at the hoist.
- Designed by: Anthony C. George

The flag of Grenada consists of two yellow triangles at the top and bottom and two green triangles at the hoist and fly. These are surrounded by a red border charged with six five-pointed yellow stars – three at the top centre and three at the bottom centre – along with an additional star on a red disc at the centre and a nutmeg at the hoist triangle. Adopted in 1974 to replace the temporary design used since the islands became an Associated State of the United Kingdom, it has been the flag of Grenada since the country gained independence that year. The representation of a nutmeg is symbolic of the islands' primary export, and was the one feature from the previous flag that was preserved.

== History ==
Sovereignty over Grenada changed hands between the French and the British throughout the 18th century. This continued until 1783, when the Peace of Paris saw France permanently relinquish the island to the United Kingdom. It eventually became a crown colony within the latter's colonial empire in 1877. The territory joined the West Indies Federation in 1958 and was a member state until 1962. On 3 March 1967, five years after the federation was dissolved, Grenada became an Associated State. This gave Grenada full control over domestic matters, while Britain retained responsibility for the territory's foreign affairs and defence. A new flag for the territory was adopted, though this was only intended to be a temporary design. It consisted of a horizontal tricolour of blue, yellow, and green bands, charged with a nutmeg at the centre.

Negotiations for independence commenced after the Grenada United Labour Party won the most seats in the election in August 1967, having campaigned in favour of sovereignty. A search for a national flag began soon after. The new design was created by Anthony C. George, a native Grenadian from Soubise in Saint Andrew Parish. It eschewed the commonly used arrangement of a horizontal or vertical tricolour, while maintaining the nutmeg symbol from the previous flag. The new flag was hoisted at midnight on 7 February 1974, the day Grenada became an independent country, and was adopted by the government the same day.

== Design ==
The colours and symbols of the flag carry cultural, political, and regional meanings. The green epitomises the islands' vegetation and agriculture, while the yellow evokes the sun, as well as the warmth and wisdom of Grenadians. The red represents harmony, unity, courage, and vitality.

The yellow stars on the red border symbolise the country's parishes, while the yellow star on the red disc at the centre signifies its two sister islands, Carriacou and Petite Martinique which are counted as the country’s seventh parish. The symbol of a nutmeg at the hoist alludes to one of the primary agricultural exports of the islands. The country is the second-largest producer of nutmeg in the world, trailing only Indonesia. Consequently, Grenada has acquired the nicknames of "Isle of Spice" and "Spice Island".

== Variants ==
The civil ensign (for merchant ships) is identical in design to the national flag, but has an aspect ratio of 1:2 (instead of 3:5). The naval ensign is based on the British white ensign, a red cross on a white field, with the addition of the national flag in the canton. The naval ensign is used by the Royal Grenada Coast Guard.

Variant flags of Grenada
Variant flag	Usage
	Civil ensign
	Naval Ensign

== Protocol ==
Advice regarding flag etiquette is listed on the official website of the government, as well as on the websites of the country's embassies. When displayed together with the flags of other sovereign nations, the foreign flag should not be flown on top of or to the right (i.e. observer's left) of the Grenadian flag. The only exception to this recommendation is at foreign diplomatic missions on the island, which is also the only place where a foreign flag can be flown without the flag of Grenada accompanying it. When displayed together with domestic flags, the national flag has to be situated at the centre and be the tallest one of the group. The Grenadian flag should not be smaller in size compared to other flags being flown adjacent to it. When carried in a procession, it should be located on the marching right (in a single file) or at the front of the centre (if there is more than one line).

The guidelines also state that the flag is not to touch the ground, nor should it be dipped towards an individual or an object. It has to be displayed either in or near every polling place when elections in Grenada are held. The national flag should be flown by merchant ships that are registered in the country, but should not be placed on top of motor vehicles (other than by the police force and during state events). It is not to be reproduced for commercial purposes without prior approval from the government. When it becomes damaged and is no longer fit to be publicly displayed, it is permissible to dispose of the national flag via burning.

== Historical flags ==
Historical flags of Grenada
Historical flag	Duration	Description
	1875–1903	A Blue Ensign defaced with the first colonial badge of Grenada.
	1903–1967	A Blue Ensign defaced with the second colonial badge of Grenada.
	1967–1974	A horizontal tricolour of blue, yellow, and green bands, with a sprig of nutmeg on a white oval at the centre.

== See also ==
- List of Grenadian flags
