= Crochu =

- Village
- Location within Grenada
- Coordinates: 12°03′N 61°39′W
- Country: Grenada
- Parish: Saint Andrew
- Elevation: 108 ft (33 m)
- Time zone: UTC-4

Crochu is a town in Saint Andrew Parish, Grenada. It is located towards the southern end of the island, along the eastern coast.
