= Leo de Gale =

1st Governor-General of Grenada

Sir Leo de Gale GCMG CBE

1st Governor-General of Grenada
- In office 7 February 1974 – 30 September 1978
- Monarch: Elizabeth II
- Prime Minister: Sir Eric Gairy
- Preceded by: Office established Himself as Governor
- Succeeded by: Sir Paul Scoon

Governor of Grenada
- In office 24 January 1974 – 7 February 1974
- Monarch: Elizabeth II
- Preceded by: Dame Hilda Bynoe
- Succeeded by: Office abolished Himself as Governor-General of Grenada

Personal details
- Born: December 28, 1921 St. Andrew's Parish, British Windward Islands
- Died: March 23, 1986 (aged 64) England

Sir Leo Victor de Gale GCMG CBE (28 December 1921 – 23 March 1986) was the first governor-general of Grenada, from February 7, 1974 to September 30, 1978.

== Biography ==
Leo de Gale was born in St. Andrew's Parish, near Grenville, Grenada. He had served in World War II with the Canadian armed forces in the Battle of Britain, Italian Campaign, liberation of France and invasion of Germany. After the war, he served as acting Governor of Grenada for two weeks before it officially achieved independence in February 1974 and he became Governor-General. He retired the year before the 1979 Grenada Revolution.

In the 1960s, Dame Hilda Bynoe, who was the incumbent governor of Grenada, appointed Leo de Gale as the acting governor of Grenada because she had to take care of some business in a foreign country.

Sir Leo de Gale became the first governor-general during the time of Prime Minister Sir Eric Mathew Gairy. Sir Leo de Gale served from 1974 to 1978. He was then followed by Sir Paul Scoon (1978 to 1992).

Following his political career he took up residence in Bristol, England.

In 2014, De Gale’s medals were gifted by his daughter Frances Taborne to the Grenadian national museum.

Preceded by Himself (as the last Governor of Grenada)	Governor-General of Grenada; 1974–1978	Succeeded by Sir Paul Scoon
