= Carlyle Glean =

Grenadian politician (1932–2021)

Sir Carlyle Glean GCMG
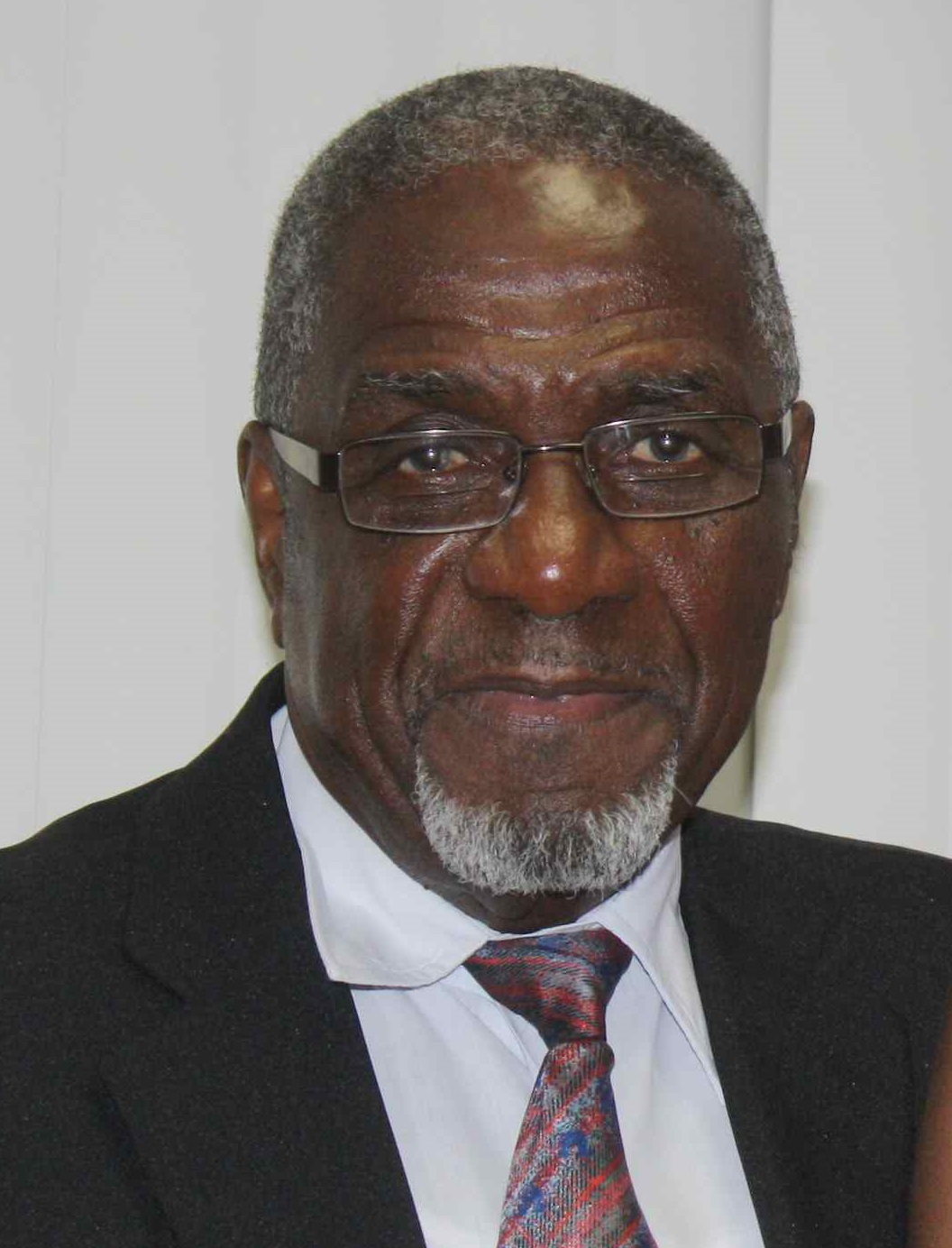

5th Governor-General of Grenada
- In office 27 November 2008 – 7 May 2013
- Monarch: Elizabeth II
- Prime Minister: Tillman Thomas; Keith Mitchell
- Preceded by: Sir Daniel Williams
- Succeeded by: Dame Cécile La Grenade

Minister of Education
- In office 1990–1995
- Monarch: Elizabeth II
- Prime Minister: Sir Nicholas Brathwaite

Personal details
- Born: Carlyle Arnold Glean; 11 February 1932 Gouyave, Grenada, British Windward Islands (now Grenada)
- Died: 21 December 2021 (aged 89) Grenada
- Spouse: Norma DeCoteau
- Education: University of Calgary (BEd); University of East Anglia (MA)

Sir Carlyle Arnold Glean, GCMG (11 February 1932 – 21 December 2021) was a Grenadian politician and educator who served as governor-general of Grenada from 2008 to 2013. A member of the National Democratic Congress, he served in the Senate and was Minister of Education from 1990 to 1995.

== Early life and education ==
Carlyle Arnold Glean was born in Gouyave, Grenada, British Windward Islands, on 11 February 1932, to Olive McBurnie and George Glean. He attended the Grand Anse Roman Catholic School from 1937 to 1943, before attending the St. John's Roman Catholic School. He graduated with a Bachelor of Education after attending the University of Calgary from 1967 to 1970, and a Master of Arts in education after attending the university from 1972 to 1973. He graduated with a Master of Arts in education from the University of East Anglia in 1982.

== Career ==
=== Education ===
Glean taught at the Pupil Teacher Training Centre from 1947 to 1949, and at the Grenada Teachers’ College from 1964 to 1965. He also taught primary students at the St. John's Roman Catholic School. He was appointed vice-principal of the Grenada Teacher’s College in 1973, and principal in 1974. He became the first lecturer in social studies education at the University of the West Indies in 1976. He became a member of the Caribbean Examinations Council's social studies panel in 1982, and was assistant chief examiner from 1979 to 1984.

=== Politics ===
In 1986, Glean became the chair of the National Democratic Congress (NDC) in the St. John constituency. He later served as general secretary and deputy chairman of the NDC.

Glean ran for a seat in the 1990 election from the St. John constituency, but lost to Edzel Thomas and was appointed to the Senate by Nicholas Brathwaite. He was Minister of Education from 1990 to 1995. After the 1995 election he became the senior opposition senator. Glean resigned from the Senate in 1998.

Glean served as Governor-General of Grenada from 2008 to 2013. The release of the last prisoners involved in the coup that killed Maurice Bishop, including Bernard Coard, was approved by Glean in 2009.

== Personal life and death ==
Glean married Norma DeCoteau in April 1955, with whom he had five children. He was a member of the Catholic Church.

Glean died on 21 December 2021, at the age of 89. He received tributes from current Governor-General La Grenade, Prime Minister Keith Mitchell, and the National Democratic Congress.

== Honours ==
=== Commonwealth Honours ===
- - United Kingdom : Knight Grand Cross of the Order of St. Michael and St. George (GCMG)

Government offices
Preceded by Sir Daniel Williams	Governor-General of Grenada; 2008–2013	Succeeded by Dame Cécile La Grenade
