= Reginald Palmer =

3rd Governor-General of Grenada

Sir Reginald Palmer

3rd Governor-General of Grenada
- In office 6 August 1992 – 8 August 1996
- Monarch: Elizabeth II
- Prime Minister: Nicholas Brathwaite; George Brizan; Keith Mitchell
- Preceded by: Himself(Acting)
- Succeeded by: Daniel Williams

Acting Governor-General of Grenada
- In office 31 July 1992 – 6 August 1992
- Monarch: Elizabeth II
- Prime Minister: Nicholas Brathwaite
- Preceded by: Paul Scoon
- Succeeded by: Himself(Permanent)

Personal details
- Born: 15 April 1923 Grenada
- Died: 23 May 2016 (aged 93)

Sir Reginald Oswald Palmer GCMG MBE (15 February 1923 – 23 May 2016) was the governor-general of Grenada from 6 August 1992 to 8 August 1996.

== Biography ==
Beginning his career in education, first as a pupil teacher he went on to become the head teacher of St. George's Roman Catholic School in 1956. In 1972 he was promoted to the government post of Assistant Education Officer and then in 1973 was made Principal of the Grenada Teacher's College. The following year he was again promoted, becoming the government Chief Education Officer. Palmer retired from public service in 1980 and entered the private sector, serving two terms as President of the Grenada Employer's Federation. He died in May 2016 at the age of 93.

== Notes ==
Government offices
Preceded by Sir Paul Scoon	Governor-General of Grenada; 1992–1996	Succeeded by Sir Daniel Williams
