= Paul Scoon =

Governor-General of Grenada from 1978 to 1992

The Right Honourable Sir Paul Scoon GCMG GCVO OBE
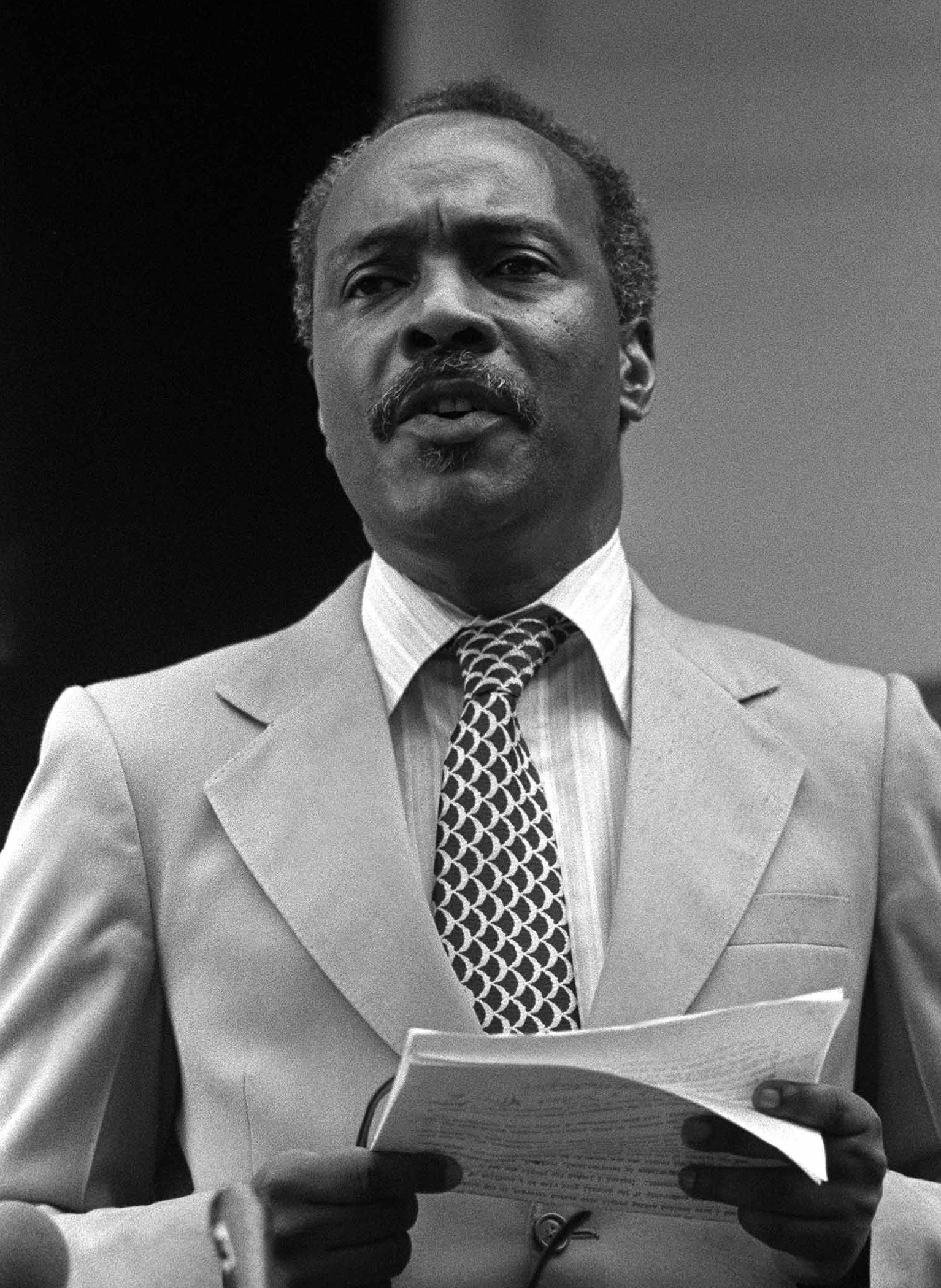
- Scoon in 1983

2nd Governor-General of Grenada
- In office 30 September 1978 – 6 August 1992
- Monarch: Elizabeth II
- Prime Minister: Sir Eric Gairy (1978–79); Maurice Bishop (1979–83); Bernard Coard (1983); Hudson Austin (1983); Nicholas Brathwaite (1983–84); Herbert Blaize (1984–89); Ben Jones (1989–90); Nicholas Brathwaite (1990–92)
- Preceded by: Sir Leo de Gale
- Succeeded by: Sir Reginald Palmer

Personal details
- Born: 4 July 1935 Gouyave, British Windward Islands (now Gouyave, Grenada)
- Died: 2 September 2013 (aged 78) St. Paul's, Grenada
- Party: Independent
- Education: University of Leeds; University of Toronto

Sir Paul Godwin Scoon GCMG GCVO OBE (4 July 1935 – 2 September 2013) was a Grenadian politician who served as governor-general of Grenada from 1978 to 1992. His tenure is notable for the hectic events related to the rise and fall of the People's Revolutionary Government, as well as his personal involvement in and support of the invasion of Grenada.

== Early life ==
Scoon was born on 4 July 1935 in Gouyave, a town on the west coast of Grenada. He attended St. John's Anglican School and then the Grenada Boys' Secondary School. Scoon then received an external degree from the University of London before going on to study at the University of Leeds, England, and gaining an M.Ed. at the University of Toronto in Toronto, Ontario, Canada. He returned to Grenada to teach at the Grenada Boys' Secondary School. Following a career rising from Chief Education Officer to finally becoming Secretary to the Cabinet, the head of Grenada's Civil Service. He was awarded the OBE in 1970. That same year, he married Esmai Monica (nee Lumsden) McNeilly, a widow with three children. In 1973 he returned to London to fill the post of Deputy Director of the Commonwealth Foundation.

== Governor-General ==
In 1978, Scoon was appointed Governor-General of Grenada by Queen Elizabeth II, on the advice of the Prime Minister, Sir Eric Gairy. However, the following year, the New Jewel Movement – led by Maurice Bishop and Scoon's former pupils, Bernard Coard and Hudson Austin – overthrew Gairy in a popularly supported, nearly bloodless coup.

Initially arrested by the militants, Scoon was soon released with an apology. The insurgents wanted to continue Grenada's status as a constitutional monarchy and retain the position of Governor-General to represent the monarch, Queen Elizabeth II. Scoon and Bishop managed to maintain a semi-normal working relationship, despite the fact that Scoon strongly opposed the Marxist-Leninist principles of Bishop's leftist government. The revolutionaries regarded Scoon as a useful figurehead who would smooth international recognition for their new regime and also facilitate their relations with Canada and the United Kingdom. Scoon was happy to remain in office, providing a degree of stability in the situation, despite irritation at the curtailment of some of his privileges. He played tennis with Bishop and maintained his reputation for discretion.

=== Role in the 1983 U.S. invasion ===
Bishop was in turn deposed by a counter-coup and executed on 12 October 1983, which was orchestrated by Bernard Coard, Bishop's erstwhile friend and governing partner. In the course of a continuing power struggle, Bishop and three of his closest ministers were executed on 19 October by People's Revolutionary Army soldiers loyal to the Coard faction. A 16-member military council led by Hudson Austin then declared martial law and asserted iron-fisted control over the fractured nation. Scoon, acting through secret diplomatic channels, asked the United States and concerned Caribbean nations to intervene to restore peace and order to the island. The invasion coalition maintained that Scoon was within his rights to do so, acting under the reserve powers vested in the Crown. However, an independent expert examination later found a dubious constitutional basis for Scoon's call for foreign intervention and his assumption of executive and legislative power. On 25 October, the invasion of Grenada (codenamed Operation Urgent Fury) was launched by a joint U.S.-Caribbean force to depose Austin's rule.

When the invasion occurred, one of the first steps was to free Governor-General Scoon, a task assigned to United States Navy SEALs. A SEAL unit arrived by Blackhawk helicopter under fire, and became trapped with Scoon at his official residence in the capital, St. George's. After a day-long encirclement, Scoon, his family and staff, and 22 SEALs were liberated by Marines from the 22nd Marine Expeditionary Unit. The U.S. and Caribbean governments quickly reaffirmed Scoon as the Queen's only legitimate representative in Grenada – and hence the only lawful authority on the island. On 27 October, the text of a letter from Scoon, dated 24 October, was publicly released, in which he requested armed intervention. The letter was cited as evidence that the invasion was not a unilateral U.S. act, but a regional police action. After the invasion, however, Scoon was anxious for U.S. forces to leave as soon as possible, stating a fortnight after the intervention that he "cannot see people from abroad coming in to change our minds or souls and [the] whole heart of a society" and that "it is important that within the shortest possible time that we should live and work in a situation where security support takes the form of a police operation that will increasingly come under the command of a Grenadian or West Indian commissioner of police."

As per Commonwealth constitutional practice, Scoon became interim head of government and appointed an advisory council, which in turn named Nicholas Brathwaite as chairman and interim prime minister until post-invasion elections were held in 1984. Scoon retired from his post in 1992.

== Later life ==
Scoon published a book entitled Survival for Service that provided a personal account of his experiences as Governor-General. In it, he denied writing the 24 October letter, saying it had been delivered to him in draft form on 26 October, after he was rescued. He did, however, confirm that he had asked for U.S. and Caribbean intervention. The accuracy of some of this book has been questioned by Richard Hart.

Scoon died on 2 September 2013. Although the cause of death was not announced, he had been a diabetic for many years.

Preceded by Sir Leo de Gale	Governor-General of Grenada; 1978–92	Succeeded by Sir Reginald Palmer
