= Cécile La Grenade =

Governor-General of Grenada since 2013

Her Excellency Dame Cécile La Grenade GCMG OBE DStJ
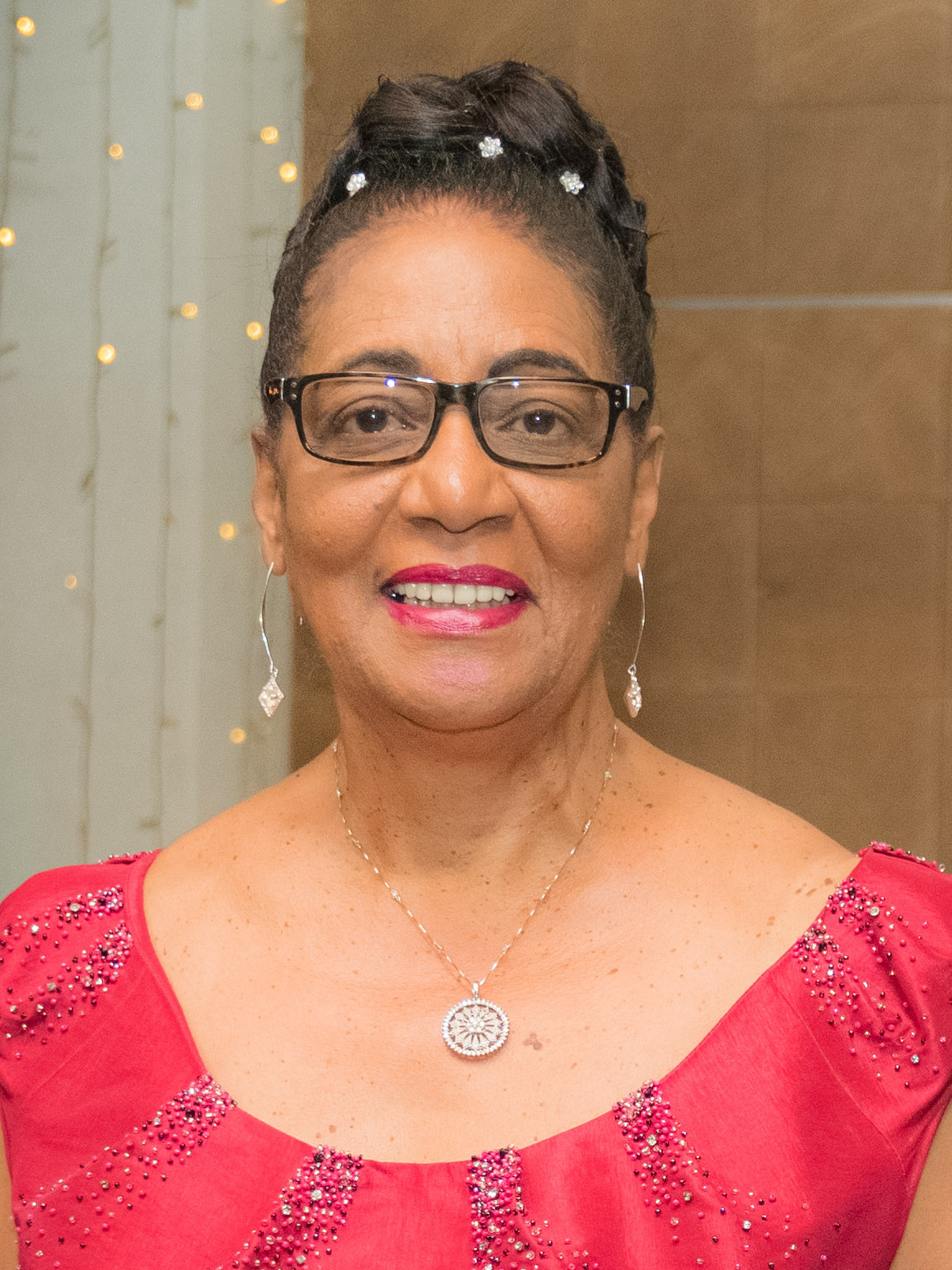
- La Grenade in 2022

Governor-General of Grenada
- Incumbent
- Assumed office 7 May 2013
- Monarchs: Elizabeth II; Charles III
- Prime Minister: Keith Mitchell; Dickon Mitchell
- Preceded by: Carlyle Glean

Personal details
- Born: Cécile Ellen Fleurette La Grenade; 30 December 1952 (age 73) La Borie, Saint George Parish, Grenada
- Relations: Maurice Bishop (cousin); Alimenta Bishop (aunt); Eva Sylvester (grandmother)
- Education: University of the West Indies; University of Maryland, College Park

Dame Cécile Ellen Fleurette La Grenade, GCMG OBE DStJ (born 30 December 1952) is a Grenadian food scientist who has served as governor-general of Grenada since 2013. She is the first woman to hold this position.

== Early life and career ==
La Grenade was born in La Borie, located in Saint George Parish, Grenada. She is the third of five daughters born to Allan A. La Grenade MBE, a civil servant, and Sibyl Sylvester-La Grenade, a registered nurse. Her maternal grandmother, Mary Louise "Eva" Ollivierre-Sylvester, was the first woman in the British Windward Islands to serve on the legislative council of her country, after being elected in 1952, less than a year after universal suffrage. She is a paternal first cousin of Maurice Bishop, the Prime Minister of Grenada during the 1979-83 People's Revolutionary Government. La Grenade is a food scientist trained in the United States. She holds a bachelor's degree in chemistry from the University of the West Indies, as well as a master's degree and doctorate in food science from the University of Maryland at College Park.

She became a member of the Caribbean Export Development Agency’s Steering Committee, serving as the OECS Private Sector Representative, in 2006. In 2007 she was appointed Chairman of the Public Service Commission by Governor-General Sir Daniel Williams, a position she held until 2010.

== Governor-General of Grenada ==
La Grenade's appointment as governor-general of Grenada was announced during the same week as the death of Grenada's first female governor, Dame Hilda Bynoe. Bynoe was the goddaughter of La Grenade's maternal grandfather, Dr Cyril I. St Bernard Sylvester, an educator and public servant. La Grenade was made a Dame Grand Cross of the Order of Saint Michael and Saint George by Queen Elizabeth II on 11 July 2014.

As governor-general, La Grenade opened the new Grenadian Parliament building in 2018. That same year, following the 15-0 victory of the New National Party in the March general election, she independently exercised the royal prerogative by appointing members of the defeated National Democratic Congress to the Senate in order to provide a parliamentary opposition to the government. As patron of the Willie Redhead Foundation and the Grenada National Trust, she has been an outspoken supporter of the restoration of Grenada's architectural heritage, especially the viceregal residence of Government House and York House, the former seat of Parliament.

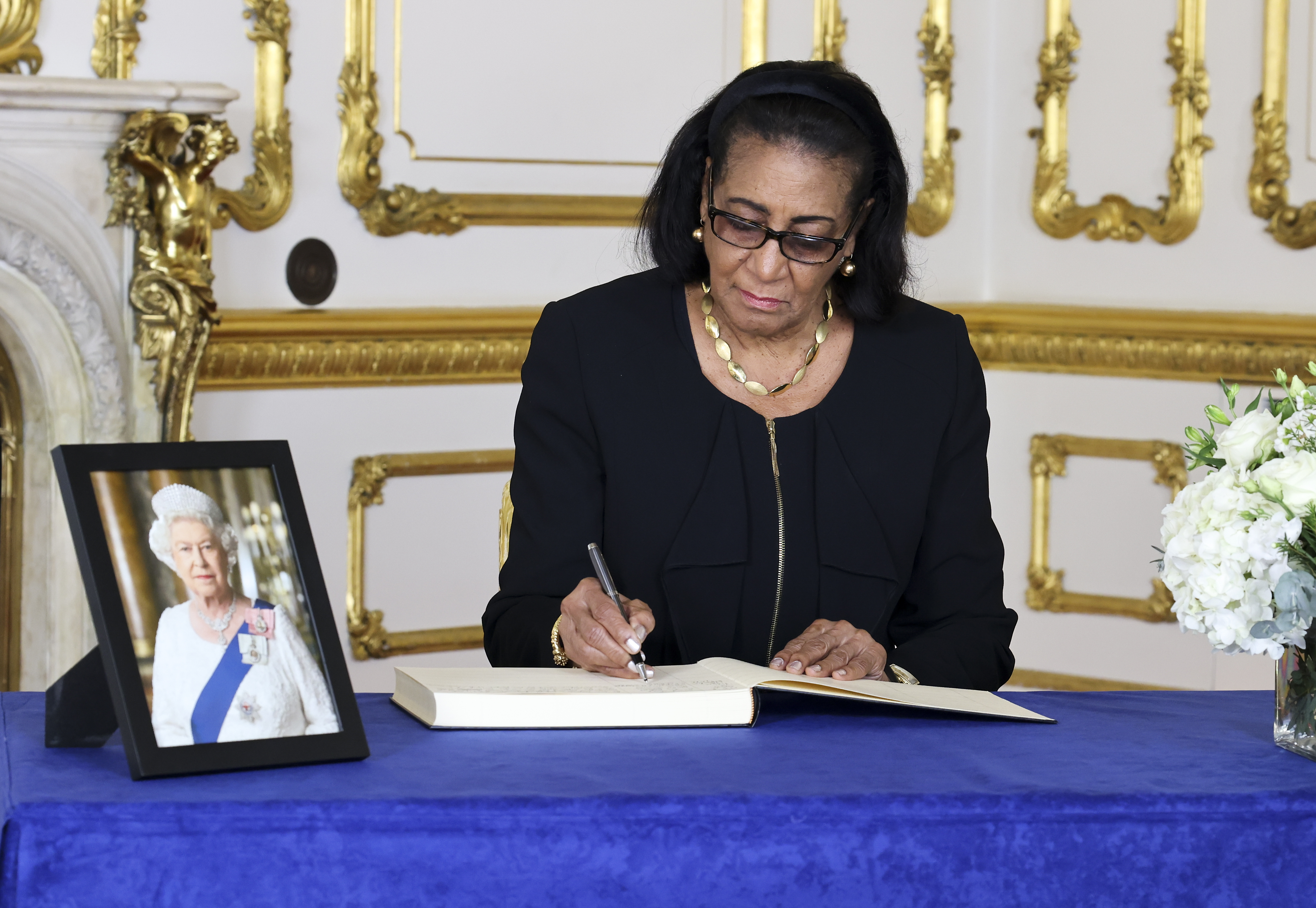
La Grenade signing the book of condolence for Queen Elizabeth II at Lancaster House on 17 September 2022

Upon the death of Queen Elizabeth II in September 2022, La Grenade became the first Grenadian governor-general to have served under two monarchs. She said that the Queen served with "incomparable devotion", and that "her legacy of leadership and exemplary service shall live on indelibly". She also represented Grenada at the Queen's state funeral in the United Kingdom. Alongside Prime Minister Dickon Mitchell she represented Grenada at the Coronation of King Charles III in 2023.

== Honours ==
- Italy
  - (Kingdom of the Two Sicilies) Two Sicilian Royal Family: Knight Grand Cross of Justice of the Two Sicilian Royal Sacred Military Constantinian Order of Saint George
- United Kingdom
  - Dame Grand Cross of the Order of St Michael and St George
  - Officer of the Order of the British Empire
  - Dame of the Order of St John

== Sources ==
- United Nations CEDAW/C/GRD/Q/1-5/Add.1 :Convention on the Elimination of All Forms of Discrimination against Women; Distr.: General, 4 November 2011; ADVANCE UNEDITED VERSION (p. 14)
- Shepherd, Verene A. (editor), Women in Caribbean History (Kingston: Ian Randle, 1999, ISBN 978-1558761896).

Government offices
Preceded by Carlyle Glean	Governor General of Grenada; 2013–present	Incumbent
