= 2016 Grenadian constitutional referendum =

A constitutional referendum was held in Grenada on 24 November 2016. Voters were asked whether they approved of seven amendments, with each one voted on separately. The amendments would only have been approved if two-thirds of valid votes had been cast in favour. However, all seven proposals were rejected by voters. It was the first referendum in Grenada's history.

== Proposed amendments ==
The seven proposed amendments were:

1. The Caribbean Court of Justice becomes the final court of appeal (as opposed to the Judicial Committee of the Privy Council in London); renaming the Supreme Court of Grenada and the West Indies Associated States as the "Eastern Caribbean Supreme Court"; introducing a code of conduct for civil servants; changing the oath of allegiance so that allegiance is sworn to Grenada instead of the Queen. (CCJ and Other Justice Related Matters)
2. Creation of an Elections and Boundaries Commission to replace the Constituency Boundaries Commission and the Supervisor of Elections. (Elections and Boundaries Commission)
3. Allow the leader of the party with the most votes to be appointed Leader of the Opposition and to sit in the House of Representatives if the second-placed party fails to win a seat in a general election. (Ensuring a Leader of the Opposition)
4. Introduce fixed dates for elections, with the caveat that a vote of no confidence may trigger an early election. (Fixed Date for Elections)
5. Changing the official name of the State from "Grenada" to "Grenada, Carriacou and Petite Martinique". (Name of State)
6. An expansion of the list of fundamental rights and freedoms. (Rights and Freedoms)
7. Limiting the Prime Minister to three consecutive terms in office. (Term of Office of Prime Minister)

== Campaign ==
The proposed amendments were supported by the governing New National Party headed by Prime Minister Keith Mitchell, as well as the Grenada National Organisation of Women and Groundation Grenada NGOs. The National Democratic Congress opposed the reforms, as did the Alliance Evangelical Churches.

== Results ==
Question	For		Against		Invalid/ blank	Total votes	Registered voters	Turnout
Question	Votes	%	Votes	%	Invalid/ blank	Total votes	Registered voters	Turnout
Caribbean Court of Justice and other Justice-related matters	9,639	43.27	12,635	56.73	903	23,177	71,241	32.53
Elections and Boundaries Commission	8,944	40.32	13,239	59.68	989	23,172	71,241	32.53
Ensuring the appointment of Leader of the Opposition	6,116	28.22	15,556	71.78	1,492	23,164	71,241	32.51
Fixed date for Elections	7,089	32.78	14,536	67.22	1,545	23,170	71,241	32.52
Name of State	9,694	43.71	12,485	56.29	1,002	23,181	71,241	32.54
Rights and Freedoms	5,067	23.62	16,388	76.38	1,703	23,158	71,241	32.51
Term of Office of Prime Minister	5,396	26.07	15,301	73.93	2,442	23,139	71,241	32.48
Source: PEO
