= Daniel Williams (governor-general) =

4th Governor-General of Grenada (1935–2024)

Sir Daniel Williams GCMG COG
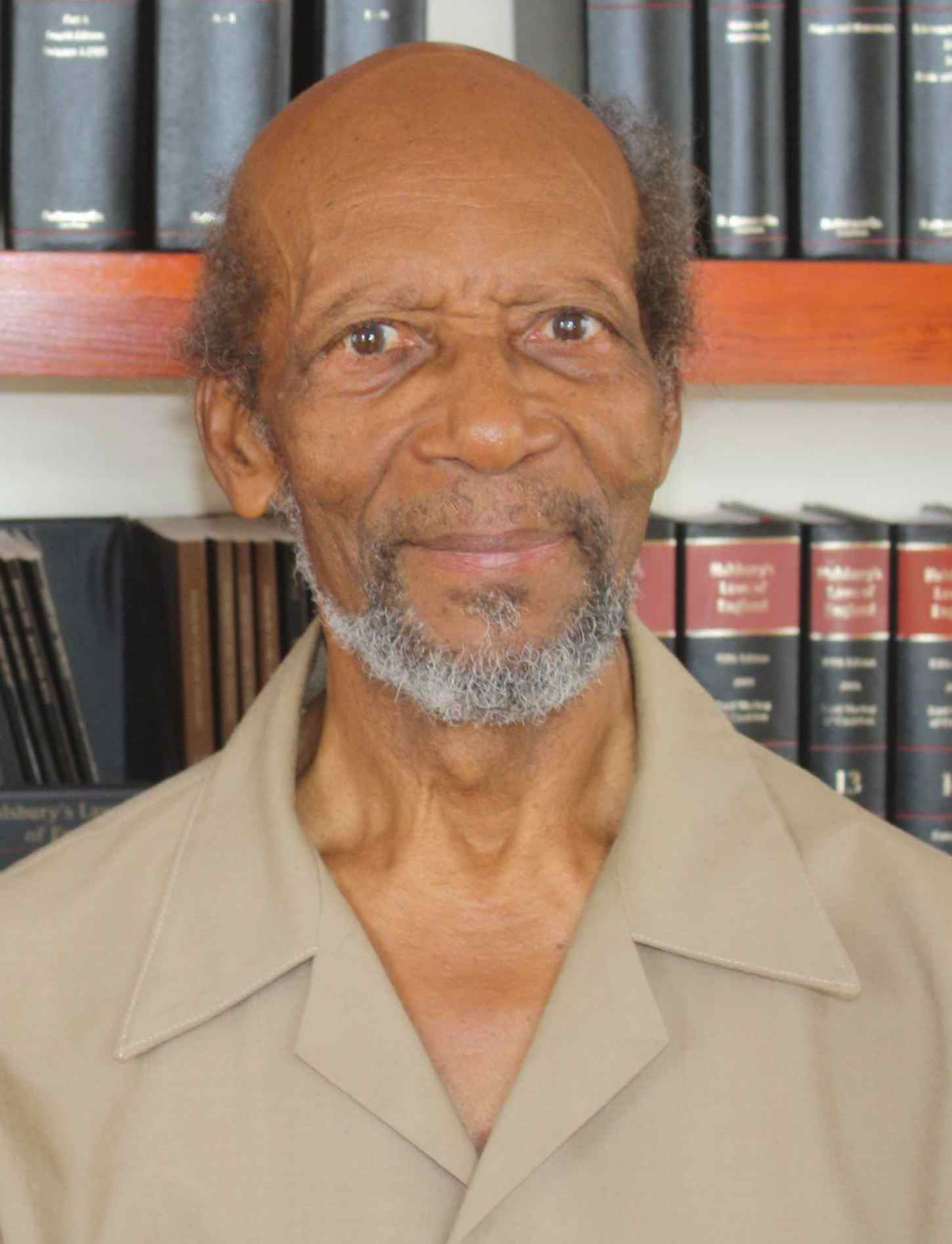
- Williams in 2012

4th Governor-General of Grenada
- In office 8 August 1996 – 18 November 2008
- Monarch: Elizabeth II
- Prime Minister: Keith Mitchell; Tillman Thomas
- Preceded by: Reginald Palmer
- Succeeded by: Carlyle Glean

Personal details
- Born: 4 November 1935 Saint David Parish, British Windward Islands (now Grenada)
- Died: 2 October 2024 (aged 88) St. George's, Grenada
- Children: 4
- Education: University of London

Sir Daniel Charles Williams GCMG COG (4 November 1935 – 2 October 2024) was a Grenadian lawyer who served as governor-general of Grenada from 8 August 1996 until 18 November 2008. He was formally appointed by Queen Elizabeth II on 9 August 1996 after having been nominated by Prime Minister Keith Mitchell.

Williams was the first Grenadian governor-general who had been active in politics prior to his appointment. He was elected to the Parliament of Grenada as a New National Party candidate in 1984. From 1984 to 1989, Williams served in various ministerial roles in the Herbert Blaize government, including a brief stint as acting prime minister in 1988. Williams resumed his private law practice after the NNP was defeated at the 1990 elections.

In 1996, he was knighted by Queen Elizabeth II as Knight Grand Cross of the Order of St. Michael and St. George (GCMG).

Williams founded the law firm Danny Williams & Co. He died on 2 October 2024, at the age of 88.

Government offices
Preceded by Reginald Palmer	Governor General of Grenada; 1996–2008	Succeeded by Carlyle Glean
