= Coat of arms of Grenada =

- Armiger: Crown of Grenada
- Adopted: 1974
- Crest: On a royal helmet affronty, lambrequined Gules, seven red roses surrounded with a garland of Bougainvillea-flowers.
- Torse: Argent and Gules
- Shield: Quarterly, a cross Or, 1&4: Gules, a lion passant guardant Or, 2&3: Vert, a crescent and a lily Or; and in nombril point a picture of the Santa Maria.
- Supporters: An armadillo on the dexter, supporting a stalk of maize, and a ramier pigeon on the sinister, supporting a banana tree, all proper
- Compartment: Mount St. Catherine and Grand Etang lake, all proper
- Motto: Ever Conscious of God, We Aspire, Build and Advance as One People

The coat of arms of Grenada is the official heraldic achievement of the Caribbean island state of Grenada. It was granted by royal warrant of Queen Elizabeth II on 6 December 1973.

== Description ==
The primary feature of the arms is a shield divided into four parts by a golden cross. In the centre of this cross is the Santa Maria, Columbus' flagship during his first voyage to the Americas. A lion passant guardant on a red field is shown in the upper left and lower right sections of the shield, representing the island's British heritage, as well as strength and determination. A golden crescent moon out of which a lily grows occupies the upper right and lower left sections, symbolising the island's dedication to the Virgin Mary.

The shield is surmounted by a royal helmet, symbolising the monarchy, topped with a garland of bougainvillea branches, the national flower. Within the garland are seven red roses, which stand for the seven communities of Grenada (the six parishes and the Southern Grenadines). The shield is supported on the dexter side by a nine-banded armadillo which stands before a corn stalk; on the sinister side is a Grenada dove, which stands before a banana plant. The base represents Mount St. Catherine with the Grand Etang lake at the centre. A ribbon displays the national motto: "Ever conscious of God we aspire, build and advance as one people."

== Colonial badges ==
In the colonial period, Grenada's first arms were in use between 1783 and 1903. These featured Black Grenadian workers operating a sugarcane mill, pulled by a pair of oxen. The motto in Latin reads hae tibi erunt artes, a quote from the Aeneid meaning "these shall be your arts."

A second badge was used between April 1903 and 1974, depicting a sailboat and the Latin motto Clarior e Tenebris ("[I shine] more brightly from the darkness"). This badge and motto is still currently used in the emblem of the Royal Grenada Police Force.

1783–1903

1903–1974

RGPF emblem (current)
