= Battle of Belvedere estate =

Skirmish in Grenada in 1795, as part of Fédon's Rebellion

- Part of Fédon's rebellion
- A photo of Belvedere estate and the surroundings from Herman G. Hall’s book on the estate
Date	8th April 1795
Location	Belvedere Estate, Saint John Parish, Grenada
Result	Revolutionary victory, Execution of Governor Ninian Home

Belligerents
Fédon’s revolutionaries	British coloured militia of Grenada

Commanders and leaders
Julien Fédon	Louis Cazot La Grenade

Strength
Unknown	200 Militia soldiers

Casualties and losses
At least one (Jean Pierre Fédon)	Between 67–100
- The battle might have nearly been a success for the British, which is probably the reason why he swiftly executed the hostages, who he had been putting off executing.

The Battle of Belvedere estate was a skirmish that took place between the 6th and 8th April 1795 (Dates vary) at the rebel camp of Julien Fedon during the Fédon revolt (1795–1796).

== Prelude ==
Earlier in 1795 the Fedon rebellion broke out in Grenada led by Julien Fedon and Joachim Philip with the backing of the First French Republic. The rebels quickly took the towns of Grenville and Gouyave and captured 50 or 51 hostages including the governor of Grenada, Ninian Home. The British who were stationed at Saint George’s carried out various attacks and tried to cut off the revolutionaries’ supply lines. The British decided to attack Fédon’s camp to free hostages and put an end to the revolt and so on the 8th of April 1795, Louis Cazot LaGrenade, officer of the St George's Coloured Militia went to Belvedere with 200 militia troops.

== The Skirmish ==
The Militia attacked the camp in a charge led by Louis Cazot LaGrenade, however the battle was a failure and the militia were pushed back to St George’s. However Julien Fédon’s brother Jean-Pierre perished in the skirmish, which infuriated Fedon and incentivised him to carry out his threat of executing the captives.

== Aftermath ==
After the skirmish Julien Fédon carried out his threat and executed the hostages including governor Ninian Home, who were killed a few days afterward, the revolutionaries also decided to attack various plantations and freed slaves who joined the revolt (or were forced to join), they also took out various ports and cut the troops on the island off from their supply chain.
