= Paraclete, Grenada =

Coordinates: 12°08′54.00″N 61°37′38.21″W

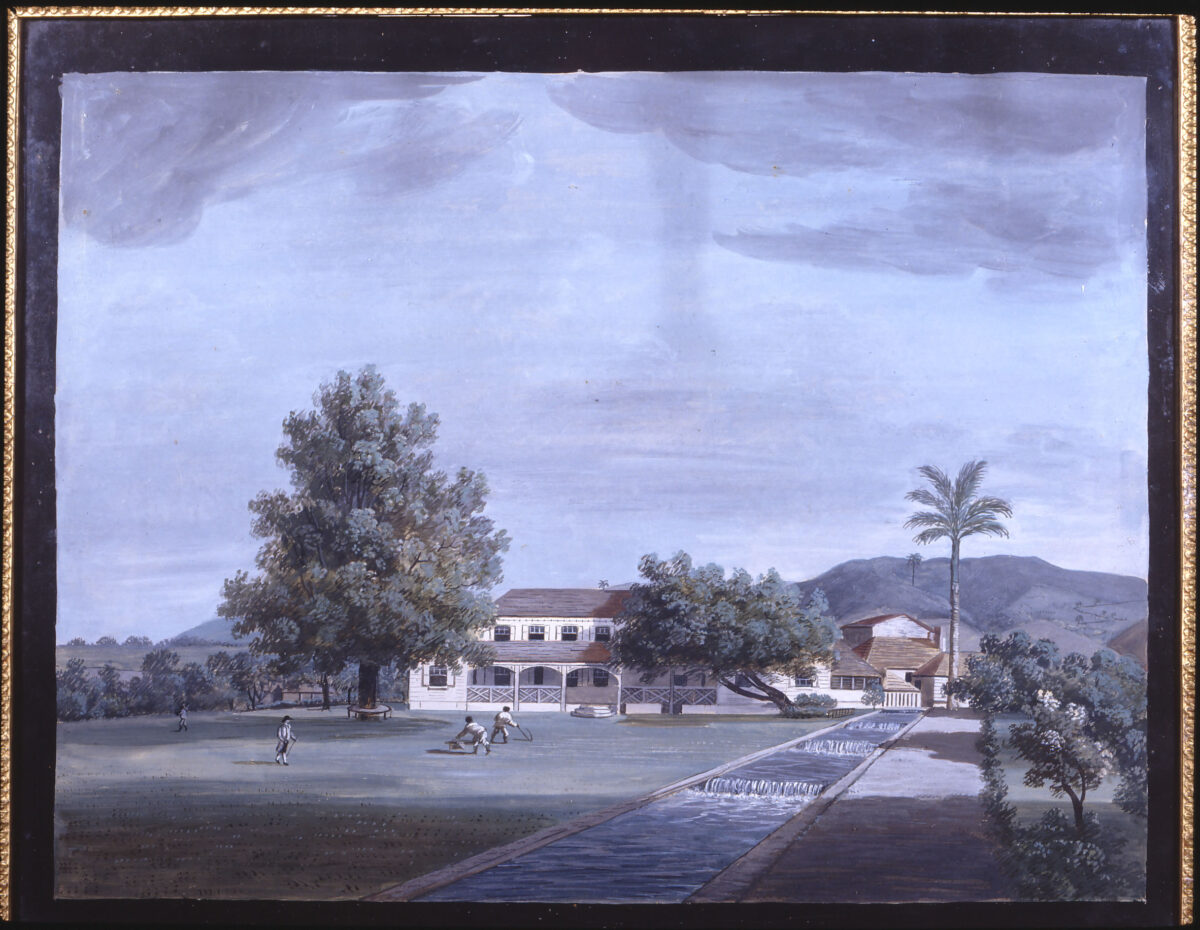
Paraclete Estate painted by Adam Callander (1750-1817) in 1789, Ninian Home is in the corner overseeing his slaves

Paraclete is a small village on the north island of Grenada, Parish of Saint Andrew, in the Caribbean. In 1795 it was the residence of the Governor, Ninian Home, who was captured there in March 1795 by rebel slaves and Frenchmen under Julien Fédon.
