= Fedon's Camp =

Historic mountain stronghold in Saint John Parish, Grenada

Fédon's Camp
- Morne Fédon
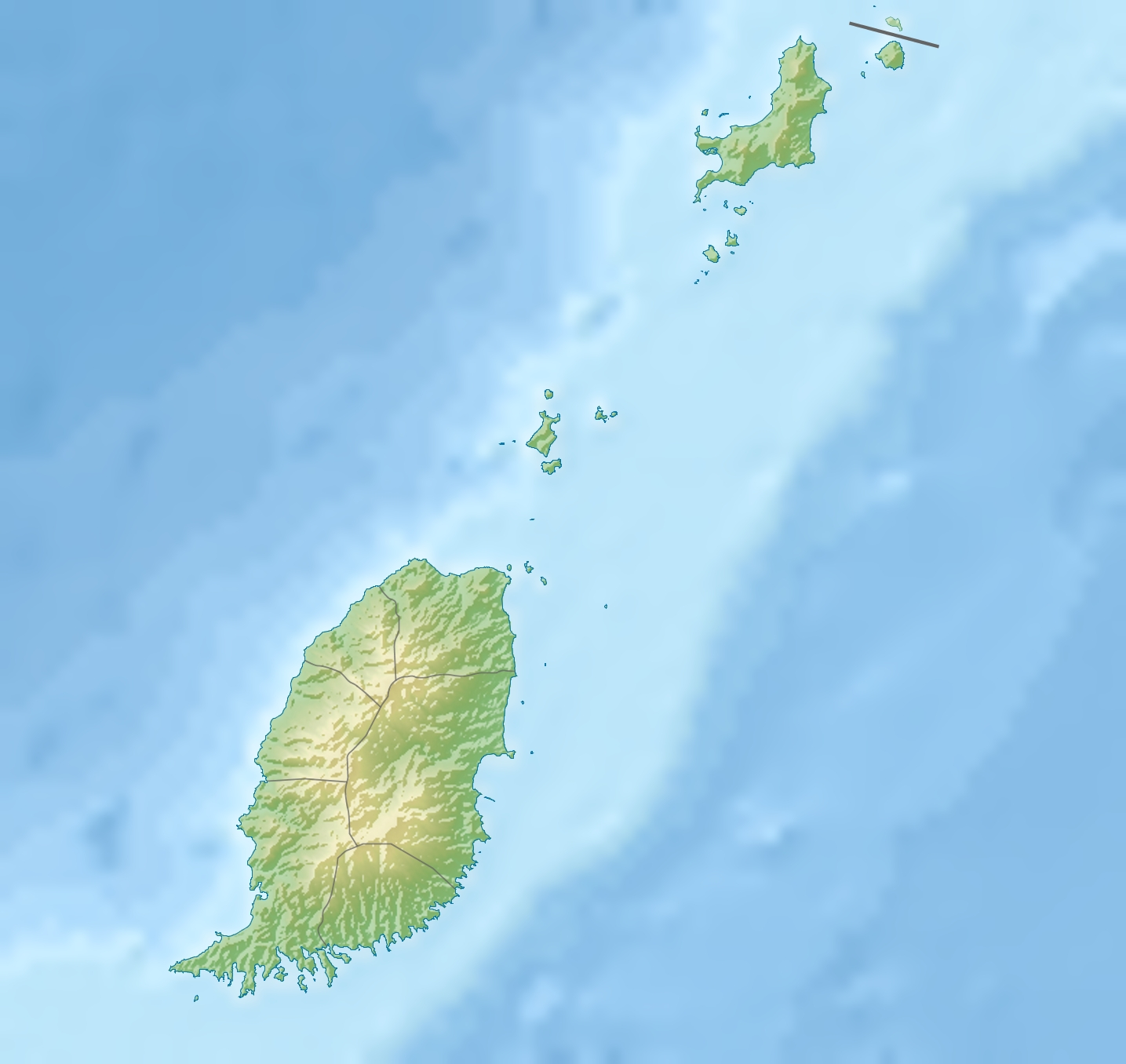
- Location within Grenada
- Peak (Camp 3) of Fédon's Camp and surroundings
- 12.118429°N 61.698159°W
- Location: St John parish, Grenada

Fédon's Camp, also known as Morne Fédon, is a mountain and historic site in St John parish, Grenada, just north of Mount Qua Qua and near the centre of the island. Rising to 765 m (2,510 ft), it commands views over much of Grenada and its eastern coast. It takes its name from Julien Fédon, the free mixed-race planter who led Fédon's rebellion against British rule in 1795–1796 and made the hill the main fortified camp of his insurgent army. The upper camp, or sometimes the whole hill, was also called Quaqua or Quaco, and after the execution of British hostages there in April 1795 it became known as the Camp de la mort ("camp of death").

The camp was the scene of the executions and burials of many British hostages and rebels, and of some of the bloodiest fighting of the final British assault in June 1796. A pillar at the summit, erected in the 1970s, is inscribed "Site of Fédon's Camp, 1795".

== Geography and name ==
Fédon's Camp lies in the central mountains of Grenada, immediately north of Mount Qua Qua, at an elevation of 765 m (2,509 ft). Geologically, the flat-topped summit is one of the andesitic lava domes, along with Mount Qua Qua, that formed at the end of a series of volcanic eruptive centres which shifted southwards from Mount Granby. Its steep, heavily forested slopes and commanding views made it a naturally defensible position.

During the French colonial period the hill was called the Montagne du Vauclain or Morne Vauclain.Kit Candlin likewise notes that the mountain on which Fédon's estate stood was known as Morne Fédon in the years after the uprising, before Grenadian authorities reduced the name to Fédon's Camp. Martin dates the current name to the mid-nineteenth century.

Fédon's own military headquarters stood not on the summit but at his Belvidere estate, in the northern shadow of the hill.

== Fortifications ==
Morne Fédon had a lower battery and two separate fortified camps, with cannon covering their almost inaccessible approaches. A lookout post called Vigie occupied the mountaintop. The design of the defences is credited to a Chevalier Desuze.

The three-part layout is described in the account by Dr. John Hay, one of the few surviving captives. The layout is also reflected in a later account of the British campaign, which says that in March 1796 Brigadier-General Lindsay captured the lowest of the rebels' three posts, before falling ill with fever.

== History ==
=== Rebel headquarters ===
Fédon, a free man of colour, owned the Belvidere estate in the mountains of St John parish, where the leaders of the conspiracy had been in the habit of meeting. The rebellion began on the night of 2–3 March 1795 with simultaneous attacks on Gouyave and Grenville, and the capture of a number of leading colonists, including Lieutenant Governor Ninian Home. The insurgents withdrew to the mountains, where the camp became the base from which they controlled most of the island outside the capital, St George's, for the following year.

=== Execution of the hostages ===
In April 1795 British forces attacked the rebel camps. Fédon had threatened to kill his prisoners if the camp was attacked, and on or about 8 April the insurgents carried out the threat, executing over 40 hostages, among them Home. Martin gives the number executed as 47; other accounts give 48 killed out of 51 or 53 captives. Some accounts connect the killings to the death of Fédon's brother, Jean-Pierre, in the fighting. The prisoners had been held on the mountain, and the killings gave the upper camp the name Camp de la mort. The physician Dr John Hay was among the few who survived, and later published an account of the captivity.

=== Final Battle ===
After the failed British attack, the rebels held the interior while British forces, confined largely to St George's Town and the coast, were weakened by disease and the loss of the lowland estates. The balance shifted in 1796 with the arrival of reinforcements under Lieutenant-General Ralph Abercromby, who reached Grenada from St Vincent on 16 June. On 10 June, Captain Jossey, commanding the French republican troops allied with Fédon, had capitulated to Major-General Oliver Nicolls at Gouyave. The remaining rebels, perhaps around three hundred, retreated to Fédon's Camp and were surrounded there.

Nicolls stormed the camp on the night of 18–19 June 1796. This event is considered the final assault, ending in the defeat of the rebels, although it took the British weeks to hunt down those who remained in the woods. Fédon himself escaped the camp and was never captured. His fate is unknown, but a common tradition holds that he drowned while trying to flee by boat.

== Legacy and present day ==
Fédon became a folk hero in Grenada, and the mountain is the only place on the island that bears his name. A pillar inscribed "Site of Fédon's Camp, 1795" was erected at the summit in the 1970s. Candlin observes that, although the site remains a folk legend, most visitors go for the view. The camp is reached on foot by steep, often muddy forest trails.

== See also ==
- Fédon's rebellion
- Julien Fédon
- Battle of Belvedere estate
- Mount Qua Qua

== Sources ==
- Martin, John Angus (2022). "Fédon's Camp". A-Z of Grenada Heritage: New and Revised (2nd ed.). Brooklyn, NY: Gully Press.
