= Fédon's rebellion =

18th-century uprising in Grenada

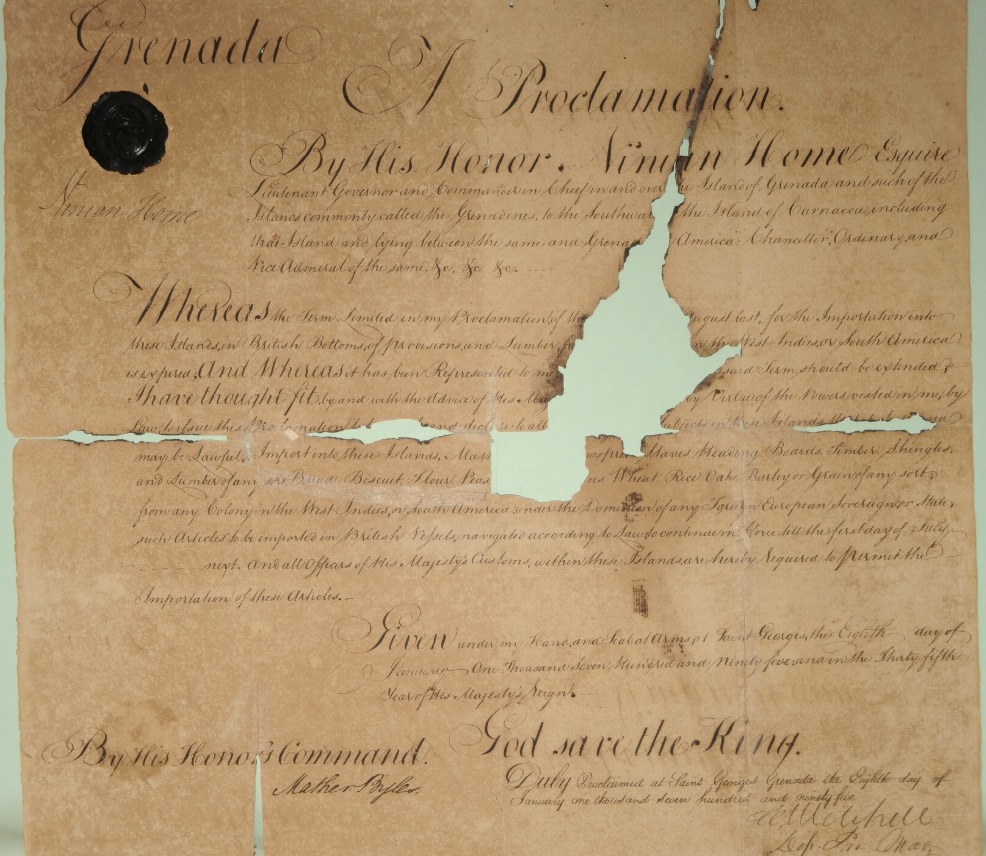
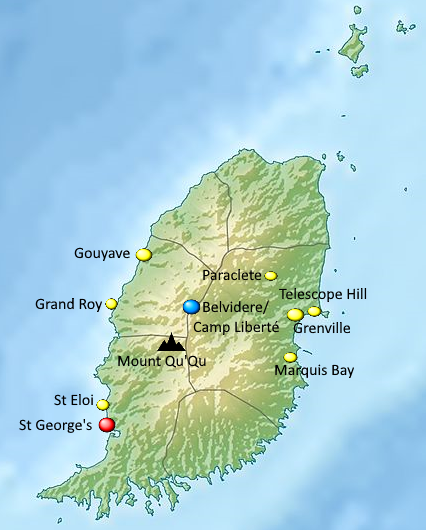
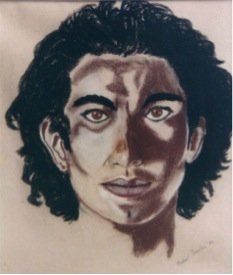
Date	2 March 1795 – 19 June 1796
Location	Grenada
Result	British victory

Belligerents
Great Britain: British West Indies; Colony of Grenada	Grenadian revolutionaries Supported by: (France) French Republic

Commanders and leaders
Ralph Abercromby (1796); Louis Cazot La Grenade; Captains Gurdon and Park; Captain Thomas Wade	Julien Fédon (MIA); Stanislaus Besson; Joachim Philip

Units involved
St George’s Regiment; Loyal Black Rangers; Black Pioneers and Artificers; Carolina Corps	Freed Slave troops; Free militiamen; (some) French regulars

Casualties and losses
Unknown	7,000+ slaves killed

Fédon's rebellion (also known as the Brigands' War, (Note: Predominantly referred to as such by the British at the time. Candlin has recently posited, however, that linking it by name to Fédon distracts historians from those who made up the bulk of the rebellion in both army and spirit, the slave population.) or Fédon's Revolution; 2 March 1795 – 19 June 1796) was an uprising against British rule in Grenada. Although a significant number of slaves were involved, they fought on both sides (the majority being on the side of Fédon and his forces). Predominantly led by free mixed-race French-speakers, the stated purpose was to create a black republic as had already occurred in neighbouring Haiti rather than to free slaves, so it is not properly called a slave rebellion, although freedom of the slaves would have been a consequence of its success. Under the leadership of Julien Fédon, (Note: Also given without the acute accent, and occasionally spelt Foedon or Feydon.) owner of a plantation in the mountainous interior of the island, and encouraged by French Revolutionary leaders on Guadeloupe, the rebels seized control of most of the island (St. George's, the capital, was never taken), but were eventually defeated by a military expedition led by General Ralph Abercromby.

Planning for the rebellion began in March 1793, when Fédon started converting his Belvidere coffee and cocoa plantation into a fortified headquarters and planting crops for his army. In early June 1795, two of his colleagues travelled to neighbouring Guadeloupe, then under the control of French revolutionary commissioners to receive arms, training and commissions, one of which made Fédon General-in-chief of the Grenadian rebel army. On the night of 2 March, this force simultaneously attacked Gouyave and Grenville; the former was relatively peaceful, but in the latter the white population was killed. Many hostages were taken. The British made a number of unsuccessful attempts at assaulting Belvidere; the estate was near the top of a very steep mountain, and almost inaccessible. After the failure of one such attack, Fédon ordered the deaths of around 40 white hostages.

For their part, the rebel army waged a campaign of looting, pillage and arson on the island's plantations, while skirmishing with the British. Both sides attempted to capture and recapture headlands and outposts with varying degrees of success. As the Royal Navy maintained an increasingly effective blockade of the island, Fédon's army was increasingly isolated and suffering from lack of reinforcements and military supplies. His force also paid the price for destroying so many crops the year before, as now a food shortage began. The British, on the other hand, received a number of large augmentations to their strength until, in June 1796, they launched another, successful assault on Belvidere. Fédon's army was routed, and his fate remains a mystery; it was assumed that he drowned trying to escape to Trinidad, but there were also reported sightings of him into the next century. As a result of Fédon's rebellion, French influence in Grenada was eradicated once and for all. Many rebels were executed, some, especially the slaves, without trial. The island's economy was devastated; whereas it had been an economic powerhouse before the rebellion, plantations and distilleries had been destroyed, causing around £2,500,000 of damage.

Although there was a dearth in scholarship regarding the rebellion until the 1960s—particularly in comparison to that of Haiti, for example—since then it has been the focus of increased study, particularly regarding the extent to which it was either a slave rebellion or part of the broader French Revolution. Fédon himself has remained an important figure in Grenadian political culture, and his rebellion is considered to have influenced not only the emancipation of slaves in the Caribbean of the next century, but a revolutionary tradition that came to a head in 1979 with the Grenadian Revolution under Maurice Bishop. Fédon is now seen as important not only for leading the rebellion but also as being at the intersection of a multiplicity of historiographical thought, such as race, revolution, Empire and slavery. Fédon's rebellion has also been the subject of a resurgence of interest in popular culture, having been the subject of a number of plays and poems, and being central to Grenada's tourist industry.

== Background ==
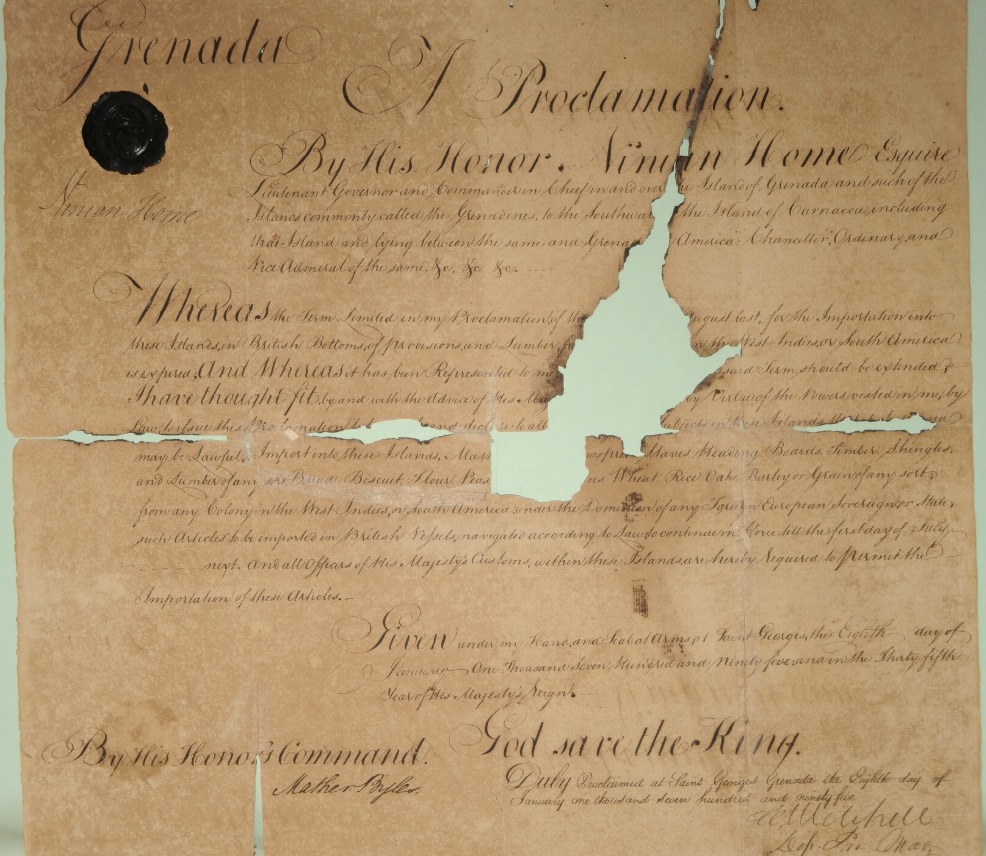
Proclamation of Ninian Home, 9 January 1795, announcing the disarming of immigrants to Grenada

Late 18th-century Grenada was a 120 square miles (310 km^{2}) island in the South-Eastern Caribbean, with a population of 1,661 whites, 415 free coloured and 26,211 slaves. Geographically it is characterised by mountains, dense forests and steep ravines. Originally colonised by France, it was formally ceded it to Britain by the Treaty of Paris in 1763. At the same time, the British administration introduced legislation restricting the King's new subjects from official positions in governing the island. Although five years later this stopped being enforced—"to the consternation of old British subjects", comments the historian Edward L. Cox—in 1793, the Privy Council ordained that this gradual process of rehabilitation was illegal and returned the status quo—and the status of Catholics—to the 1763 position. Cox argues that as a result, "rather than solving immediately and permanently Grenada's nagging political problem the ruling may have contributed directly to the imminent rebellion", as there was now a ready-made skein of discontent for Fédon to tap into. The French re-captured the island during the American Revolutionary War, after Comte d'Estaing won the bloody land and naval Battle of Grenada in July 1779. This demonstrated to both the populace and the world that Britain could, with effort, be dislodged. However, the island was restored to Britain with the Treaty of Versailles in 1783. It was a heavy cotton-producing island, and as such was integral to Britain's Industrial Revolution and Economic boom. From this point on, argue Candlin and Pybus, "the British reoccupied Grenada with a renewed sense of purpose, determined to send a clear message of racial superiority and religious intolerance". The context of the country's political tribulations, argues Martin, was "an oppressive slave plantation complex", with a recent history of frequent, if unsuccessful, slave rebellions.

News of the French revolution was, says the historian Kit Candlin, "particularly prescient" in Grenada, especially as two-thirds of the 5,000 free population were French, or gens de couleur. In the early days of the revolution, French planters appear to have remained resistant to the revolution's call to violence. In August 1790 for example, Fédon himself signed a petition against growing radicalism on the island, which claimed that both French and British planters were at risk, although this may also have been a deliberate strategy to defer suspicion. The political upheavals in nearby Haiti provided the motivation for a similar rebellion in Grenada, and also provided a sufficient diversion to allow it to happen. It was not, however, strictly a slave rebellion. In the aftermath, it was noted that perhaps only half the island's slave population had joined the rebels, the other half, comments Candlin, were "found cowering in their plantations or discovered aimlessly wandering the island's roads, unsure of what to do".

At the time of the rebellion, Grenada had a population of approximately 1,125 free coloured residents—including 940 French free coloureds—and 185 British citizens. The situation was worse for the black French, argues Martin, as—even though they were free—they were generally treated as third-class citizens by both the white French and the British. The Governor, Ninian Home, had restricted entry to the island to all but a few French whom he deemed to have "sufferings are great and...principles good"; no slaves or free-coloureds were permitted, whom he believed to be exponents of radical egalitarian doctrines to a man. (Note: This was intended to stem an influx of around 1,200 in the previous six months, which Cox suggests "augured ill for the island's safety, especially because of the doubtful attachment to the English of French-speaking persons of every colour or class".)

== Causes of the revolution ==
Internal grievances, rather than external influence, were the fundamental cause of Fédon's rebellion, argues the scholar John Angus Martin, being an "anti-discriminatory rebellion for social, political and religious rights by the French who orchestrated and led the rebellion against the British colonial government". There were some external influences: the biggest was the French Revolution and its ideology, Tom Paine's Rights of Man, the revolt in Haiti (Note: Although David Geggus has warned against seeing too much of a direct link between the movements, which he suggests is too easily "imagined rather than demonstrated".) and the general discontent that pervaded the Caribbean during the period. There had been a smouldering discontent with the British administration for some time before the rebellion. The rebellion, led as it was by slave owners and planters rather than the slaves themselves indicates that the French revolution that inspired it was seen as a method of enabling social mobility for the French rather than to free slaves. The long term origin of the revolt, argues Jacobs, was "more than a century of slave resistance and also in French discontent over British rule", while the immediate French revolutionary context "played out at the crossroads of nationality, race and political belonging".

British (Protestant) governance of the island had become "increasingly harsh", suggests Martin, especially against the French—Catholic—inhabitants whose previous political and social influence and power was now increasingly restricted by the new management. In a campaign to eradicate the French historical presence, the French language had been all but eradicated officially, and vestiges of French law also. Although the intention to allow a form of Representative government had been declared in a royal proclamation, there was a fear that a democratic assembly would be dominated by the French. To this end, all prospective members of the assembly had to take an oath against transubstantiation—in effect against the Catholic church, and therefore against the French, who were majoritively of the Catholic faith. (Note: Britain's harsh treatment of the Grenadans, suggest Candlin, can be compared to that of the Spanish who "showed a particularly lenient attitude to people of mixed race" and encouraged emigration to their Trinidad lands.) As early as 1779 the British Colonial Governor, Sir George Macartney wrote to the Secretary of State for the Colonies, Lord Germain, telling him "I have seen at Grenada the impossibility of English and French ever assimilating together". McCartney was more worried though about the loyalty of many of the English speakers. While the "leading British" as he called them were loyal to the King, McCartney expressed doubts regarding the "overseers, clerks, low-class planters and tradesmen", whom he called, as a body, "mere banditti, averse to all order, discipline and obedience...turbulent, mutinous and impatient of restraint'.

It appears that the native slave and free coloured population did not unduly worry the administration, who saw them as being unlikely to rebel of their own accord. The influx of a large number of French from surrounding islands, however, was a cause for concern. They worried the British, who, says Candlin "regarded them first with deep suspicion then actively tried to oppress them through legislation, each law underscoring further the inherent difficulty members of the white community had at distinguishing friend from foe". (Note: Legislation included restrictions on the holding of unregulated ceremonies, coloureds being forbidden to walk at night without a lantern to light them, a curfew and weapons restrictions.) On one occasion, Fédon's wife had been arrested for breaching a restriction and had been imprisoned for some weeks before he could secure her release. Marie Rose Fédon had been unable to prove she was a free woman under a ruling enacted the previous year. Those unable to do so within six weeks were to be sold into slavery. (Note: Candlin and Pybus describe Marie Rose as contemptuous of such laws...She understood the law and its implications, but she was proud of her French heritage and the liberties she had previously enjoyed. She saw no reason to travel the fourteen or so miles from [their estate] to the capital to prove who she was to the Anglo interlopers.)

The scholar of Caribbean history Laurent Dubois suggests that "chafing under [British] regulations, the free coloureds of Grenada watched intently as the nearby French colonies instituted policies of racial equality". For their part, the British—who knew what had happened in other islands—expected "anarchy, confusion and killings...Increasingly the Governor's correspondence was filled with worries for security and his fear of the island's French inhabitants, especially the free coloureds". There were rumours of a rising some months before it took place, and slaves were offered incentives to report to their owners anything they learned. (Note: Philip's own family granted one of their slaves her freedom for revealing what she knew; Candlin suggests that due to "the monotony of the regular work of the enslaved", any unusual activity would have stood out.) Lieutenant Governor Home appears to have been expecting an invasion from the French in Guadeloupe rather than an initial uprising, as he devoted most of the militia to manning coastal lookouts. (Note: In any case, argues Cox, the militia as a stand-alone force was almost useless, being raised as it was at short notice, although it did provide a sense of reassurance to the white population who would otherwise have viewed the absence of the British army with askance.)

== Planning ==
Planning of the rebellion seems to have begun around March 1793. Dr Hay later reported that a plantain crop of approximately 32 acres (0.13 km^{2}) had been planted in Belvidere around that time "for the express purpose of the present revolution". (Note: Plantain, comments Jacobs, was a wise choice of sustenance; not only was it easy to cook and nutritious, but it was self-fertilising and so only had to be planted once. It was useful not only as a food: its foliage provided cover from both surveillance and inclement weather.) This coincides with the appointment of Ninian Home as governor and may have been a direct consequence of it. Home, a Scotsman, was an established persecutor of Catholics. (Note: Jacobs notes that this was a year before the arrival of Victor Hugues in Guadeloupe, bringing news of the National Convention's abolishment of slavery in, and extension of citizenship to, French overseas territories.) Midnight meetings were held at which French revolutionary literature was distributed. The administration's lack of intelligence and materiel allowed the conspiracy to develop safe from British interference. There was a kernel of around 50 individuals of diverse social composition, including white bourgeoise and free-French blacks. No slaves, however, appear to have been involved in the planning stages of the rebellion, although they were responsible for the complex defensive earthworks and trenches around Fédon's camp. It is likely that Fedon and his comrades may have felt undermanned and in need of numerical support, which would have encouraged them to broaden their base after the planning had been finished. The rebellion was originally intended to be launched at Christmas 1794 rather than, in the event, three months later. Jacobs considers it possible that financing may have been at the root of this delay, as on 12 January 1795 the Fédons sold "eight Negro slaves" for 10,401 each; why else, questions Jacobs, would Fédon "sell slaves that he knew that he was going to free in a matter of weeks?" In the event, Fédon was clearly willing to maximise his use of slaves before freeing them, presumably as a way of guaranteeing that they performed the labouring necessary to his plans: Dr Hay noted that Fedon maintained their servile status "till the last moment".

Supplies were initially received by French Jacobin revolutionaries in Guadeloupe—including materiel and financing—under Victor Hugues. The conspiracy had been successfully hidden from the authorities, notes Martin, and "it wasn't until the day leading up to the rebellion that some British residents began to notice unusual activities among the rebels, but by then it was too late to act".

=== Participants ===
The French national cockade, issued to Fedon's men by Victor Hugues

The first slaves to join Fédon and his comrades were their own, whom they had freed as one of their first acts. Candlin has estimated that around 12,500 slaves took an active role in the rebellion, or half the island's slave population. (Note: Many others, he notes, "hedged their bets or took opportunities as they came", for instance, to escape the island.) Praedial slaves appear to have been more militant, generally, than house slaves, and a contemporary complained that it was "the most trusted, and best treated, both men and women, [who] were the first to join, and the most active in the insurrection". Although the slaves who revolted were doing so for with the aim of their own emancipation as their primary goal, they appear to have had a longer-term intention of abolishing the system itself. The French white and freedmen probably only amounted to around 150 individuals, however, while the leadership cadre possessed a "stark diversity of ideas and personalities" among them. Many had been business associates of Fédon and his brothers-in-law, or legal witnesses to deeds and charters; Murphy suggests that "personal ties, as well as the belief that political rights should be extended to men regardless of race, may have motivated at least some of the white participants". Of the rebel army in the field on the rebellion's outbreak, Craton has estimated its size at around 350 who possessed firearms, 250 with pikes or swords, and the remainder awaiting weapons. Fédon's rebels were assisted by the island's Catholic priesthood, who were later accused of fermenting dissent, as well as mulattos who had originally propagated the ideals of the French revolution in 1789–1790 but had been then driven underground by the British. Cox argues that the initial success of the rebellion is a direct result of the fact that it "seemed to promise something to all its participants".

Of Fedon himself, or his family, notes Curtis Jacob, little is known. John Garraway, whose father lived through the rebellion, reported that Fédon was of no great ability, "nor was he possessed of any extraordinary courage, but in his detestation of the whites, and his readiness to assent to any species of cruelty and atrocity, his companions saw sufficient qualifications to entitle him to command". Leaders included Fédon's brother-in-law Charles Nogues and Jean Pierre Lavalette, (Note: Occasionally Lavelette.) who were close friends with Victor Hugues; Hugues looked after and protected Nogues' son while the rebellion was ongoing. Nogues was a prominent tailor on the island, and was also Fédon's brother-in-law. Prominent whites included Clozier d'Arcuiel, Jean Baptiste Olliviere and the Chevalier du Suze who were important strategists in the military campaign as well as its administration. As well as Nogue, leading freed men included Stanislaus Besson, Etienne Ventour—a "hothead", suggests Candlin—and Joachim Philip, a coloured free planter. Fédon appears to have come under internal criticism for a having a dictatorial approach.

==== Leadership ====
Julien Fédon, the leader, was the son of a slave woman and a French planter, from whom he inherited Belvidere. Ideologically, Fédon had undergone a "remarkable" change since 1790, when he had written in support of the administration. He was both general of the army and head of the revolutionary council, known as the "Commission of the 24", which, despite concerns as to his dictatorial attitude, Fédon does seem to have regularly requested advice from. (Note: Fédon may have been related through his mother to Henri Christophe, deputy to the Haitian General L'Ouverture.) The leadership element was particularly concentrated in residents of the parishes of St John and Gouyave. Fédon, for example, was from the latter, as were a number of "prominent whites" he associated with. Ashby has questioned the extent of Fédon's ideological commitment to the French Revolution, having been a leading member of the French community and a prominent slave-owner; many of the rebellion's leadership, including Besson, Nogues, Philip and Lavalette were from wealthy slave-owning families.

Much of Fédon's immediate support came from his relatives, either by blood or by marriage. Prominent amongst them was his wife, Marie Rose, whom eyewitnesses later testified to being an "active and engaging presence" alongside Fédon. Another leading figure, Joachim Philip, was, according to Candlin, a "most interesting man". From a large and extremely prosperous family of Grenadian planters, with much standing in the community, he felt that he had been repeatedly ignored for office or patronage by the British administration. (Note: His family was also already known to the Governor, Home. In 1793 his father Michael had submitted a request to the administration for small arms to defend Petite Martinique; "unable to countenance such an idea, in the margin of the request Ninian Home scribbled 'not complied with'".) The rebellion's leadership, suggests Candlin, was composed of "tightly knit series of free coloured families who all intermarried". Fédon's deputy in the rebellion, Stanislaus Besson—also appointed by Hugues—was a local silversmith; Philip was a carpenter. Fédon was heavily mortgaged.

=== Belvidere Estate: Camp Liberté ===
The conspirators' headquarters was Fédon's remote plantation in Belvidere Estate. This covered 360 square kilometres (140 sq mi) and held 965 African slaves. Capable of producing 6,600 pounds (3.0 t) of coffee and 20,250 pounds (9.19 t) of cocoa. The Belvidere plantation was backed by a steep mountain, which Fédon fortified and is now known as Fedon's Camp. (Note: Its location, suggests Jacobs, harked back to the last revolt in Grenada, when the naive Caribs attempted to expel the British colonialists: their headquarters was the fortified peak of Mount St Catherine—the highest on the island—2,756 feet (840 m) above sea level.) The estate then was not only large but largely inaccessible and its isolation gave it commanding views of the surrounding countryside. Further, not only had Fédon arranged a food supply, but it was backed by springs and streams providing a water supply.

== Outbreak and the first week of operations ==
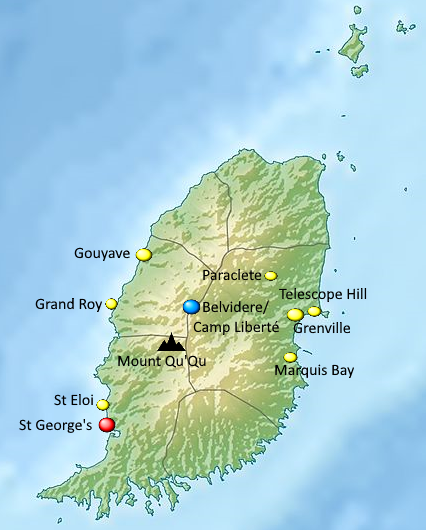

The political historian Timothy Ashby has argued that Home had a chance to assert Britain against the conspirators in 1794 when he was urged to collect arms off all the French and free coloureds. Home, though, a local planter later reported, was "fearful that such a measure would betray their own weakness and apprehensions", and did not do so. By 1 March 1795, Home, Candlin argues, was "increasingly desperate and aware that something might be afoot". The militia was raised, but—in a continuance of the heavy-handed treatment of the island's coloured population—the coloured members of the militia were excluded from the general call to arms, in whom Home "should think it the last imprudence to trust the fortifications and military stores". This created further ill-feeling, and may, suggest Candlin, encouraged those members to join, rather than resist, the rebels. Home's actions may have forced Fédon's hand in the timing of the rebellion: "On an island where distrust and disloyalty were salient features, keeping covert plans secret was impossible".

In February, Fédon despatched Nogues and Valette to Guadeloupe, seeking the assistance of the new French republican government under Victor Huges. Only absent a few days, when they returned it was bearing the rank of captain in the French revolutionary army and a large supply of arms, tricolour cockades and liberty caps. Having received ideological instruction and arms training, they returned with a commissions of rank in the French revolutionary army. Fedon was appointed Commandant-General, Stanislau Besson his deputy, and Nogue and Lavalette both captains. Nogues was Hugues' personal representative on Grenada. Their instructions were simple: To promulgate the revolution through Grenada and then to the rest of the archipelago, in return for which they would receive prompt and fulsome support. Fédon—now holding the rank of General—directed the opening assaults on the night of 2–3 March 1795, simultaneously attacking the towns of Gouyave and Grenville, (Note: At this time Grenville was often called by its French name of La Baye.) in the parishes of St John and St Andrew respectively.

=== Massacre at Grenville and Marquis ===
In the east, at the small village of Grenville, a group of around 100 insurgents attacked and overran the small towns of Grenville and Marquis. (Note: Fédon later blamed this massacre on a non-existent French Revolutionary army he claimed had invaded.) about seven miles from Belvidere. At midnight Fédon and Besson, leading a group of about 100 freedmen—some of whom guarded the entrances to the village to prevent anyone escaping—attacked. They forced 20 white residents from their beds and into the market place, where they were all shot and the bodies then cut up with cutlasses. Those that were killed immediately may have been, in the spirit of La Terreur, the local nobility. Ashby speculates that, as more houses and cellars were raided, more alcohol was consumed and this led to a breakdown of discipline among Fédon's troops. The murders, says Candlin, were done to "the cheers of their free coloured neighbours". Two whites escaped, and the town was looted. Fédon and his force withdrew with hostages to Camp Liberté. En route, more slaves and white French joined the rebels, while some hostages—including an old priest and a pilot—were killed. They also returned to Belvidere, capturing more hostages and gathering more support as they did: stopping for rest on the Balthazar Estate, the estate manager supplied them with sugar and rum; a priest who brought the manager's coat and trousers out to him was shot dead.

=== Assault on Gouyave ===
Gouyave—where Fédon owned a large property—was on the west coast of the island and was attacked at the same time as Grenville, although with far less violence. This force was led by Philip and Ventour, and included both white French and coloured men. The local Catholic priest was also in their group, armed and wearing the uniform of a French artilleryman. There were no deaths in Gouyave, the town was also looted, with houses being ransacked and torched. Ashby suggests that the more disciplined capture of Gouyave was due to a large portion of the force was made up of planters, who had received a degree of military training; some wore regulation French Army uniforms. Instead of killing those whites that had not had a chance to escape, Philip and Ventour took them hostage. The Justice of the Peace and leader of the local militia, says Candlin, Dr Hay "and his family could expect no quarter", although in the event they were spared. Candlin speculates that this may have been because he and Ventour were neighbours, or perhaps more likely, because of the value a medical doctor was recognised as having to the rebel army. The parson, McMahon, was also among the captured. The only injury was suffered by Ventour, who shot himself in the wrist while confiscating Hay's pistols. The white men were taken hostage and marched off to Belvidere, while, says Candlin, French coloured women "enjoyed the scene below from their balconies". (Note: Candlin argues that the relative lack of violence done in Gouyave may have been due to Philip, who, he suggests, had "more to lose" than his comrades.)

=== Intelligence ===
It is possible, suggests Jacobs, that Hay's own servant was a member of Fédon's intelligence network. Hay later reported how, on the forced march to Belvidere, Hay observed his "principal servant John Charles, with a national cockade in his hat; he addressed himself to me, and said he had been pressed into the service as a drummer, which I doubted". Hay believed Fedon's intelligence to be extensive. Not only was it suggested by the fact that—despite it being common supposition that the militia's supplies of guns and ammunition were held in St George's—the raiders on Hay's house knew he kept a large quantity of gunpowder in his cellar and muskets in an outhouse. Hay believed that, prior to the outbreak of rebellion, "not a single transaction of moment took place in town which was not known in six hours afterwards at their post of Belvidere", and that thefts of guns and munitions were being stolen by sympathisers in the capital and despatched to Belvidere on a daily basis. Not all Fedon's agents were slaves; at least one, Pierre Llavat, was white, and he was a constable of St George's parish, having been "strongly recommended" for the post by the magistrates, says Hay. Labat was one of the group who arrested Hay, and Jacobs argues this indicates that agents had infiltrated the colonial police, and, therefore, "at least part of Grenada's internal security had been compromised".

Governor Home was not in St George's when the rebellion was launched, but was on his estate in Paraclete in the northeast of the island. He heard exaggerated rumours that the rebels were already in control of the island, so, believing the roads to be unsafe, he took a sloop to Gouyave. (Note: A large number of Home's own slaves deserted to Fédon's armies, although several were deemed sufficiently loyal to number among the Loyal Black Regiment. Brizan argues that the Loyal Black Rangers served the British forces twice over, or what he describes as a "clear manifestation of 'divide and conquer', whereby...if the Black Rangers were successful then the British would have achieved their aim; if they were killed, white lives would have been saved".) Soon after the attackers left Gouyave, Home—not realising that the town had been raided—landed at Gouyave with four others. Fédon's brother, Jean-Pierre had been left in command; Home's longboat was captured before it had even landed, and he and his men were also taken back to Belvidere. Fédon's simultaneous assault on two targets equidistant from his central base has been seen as an example of his grasp of military tactics, as well as indicating the extent of his intelligence network. Conversely, Home's inability to act decisively has supported arguments as to his weakness of character in a crisis. Critical to Home's capture, so Grenadian oral history tells it, were the actions of a slave named Oroonko. Oroonko, it was said, wanted revenge on Home, who had split Oroonko and his wife up; recognising Home's isolation on the estate, Oroonko made his way to Fédon and passed on the information. Oronookoo, argues Jacobs, although a slave, was "obviously gathering intelligence at the highest echelons of Grenada's British community". (Note: In support of this thesis, Jacobs notes that at this point in the rebellion, no-one in Gouyave—including the Governor—even knew Fédon was leading the revolt, let alone that it would be based out of his own estate; Oroonko must have known beforehand.) Home, writing to the council in St George's on 3 March, telling them

No French had landed at La Baye, but the Free people have risen against the Whites. Captain Blair and several are killed. I think the Coloured people ought not to have their arms or at least none except Captain La Grenade's company. I shall be in town as soon as possible.

But, notes Brizan, "Governor Home was never to see St George's again".

=== Marching on St George's ===
Without entering into any detail of our rights, we summon you, and all the inhabitants, of every denomination in this colony, to surrender, within the space of two hours, to the republican forces under our command...And we give you notice, that in case of your not submitting, as you are enjoined, you shall be liable to all the scourges of a disastrous war ... Done at our camp, the fourth of March in the third year of the French Republic, one and indivisible. Julien Fédon, Officer of the Republic, appointed at Guadeloupe.

— Proclamation of Julien Fédon, 4 March 1796

The morning after the attacks on Gouyave and Grenville, a council of war and state was held in St George's, and it was resolved that—despite the town being ill-defended and poorly defensible (Note: Unlike, for example, neighbouring St Kitts, which had the permanent and strongly manned garrison at Brimstone Hill for both internal and external defence. Sir William Young, to the government, asserted that a string fort was essential for the secure governance of each of Britain's West Indian islands. According to Young, "the restlessness among the servile population matched the growing anxiety and insecurity among island whites whenever a British fleet was no longer stationary Or cruising in the Caribbean", and by 1795, Grenada epitomised that situation.)—to place the island under martial law. By the morning of 4 March, estimates Brizan, the rebel army had recruited "almost every Frenchman in the northern half of the island". A portion was dispatched to the capital, St George's. Drumming themselves on, they were heard from afar. One commentator later wrote how the local militia—comprising around 150 men—declared they would defend their lives, families and properties or die in the attempt. It was, said the observer, "a chaotic and most melancholy scene", as by now Home's capture was known of, creating further panic. A delegation comprising Nogues and Philip demanded access to the gubernatorial council; this was granted, on condition that they allow themselves to be blindfolded. This took place, but not before Philip and Nogues had to be rescued from an angry mob that included Philip's own sister, who tried to "tear him to pieces". Informing the council that they had captured "the tyrant and former Governor", they made two proclamations. The first—"chillingly uncompromising"—was from Fédon, demanding the British surrender within two hours and written in French, thus—to the British—confirming Jacobin influence over Fédon.The next speech had been prepared by Victor Hugues, in English, and countersigned by Goyrand and Le Bas. This emphasised the extent of his victory over the British at Guadaloupe, revenge, they said for the taking of Martinique by the "cannibals", Lords Grey and Jervis.

Time and the defeat of the English forces at Guadeloupe had weakened the remembrance of the heinous crimes by which the vile satellites of GEORGE had sullied the Windward Islands...that from and after the date of this our official declaration, the assassination of each and every individual republican (of whatever colour he is; and in whatever island it may happen) shall be expiated by the death of two English officers, our prisoners.

— Proclamation of Victor Huges to the British council in St George's, 4 March 1796

Fédon's message finished by telling the British that Grenada was French by birth and by right; "you", said Fédon, "are only intruders; you came from England, that is your country, where you ought to have remained". Nogues and Philip were fed and watered by the British—which "they calmly enjoyed"—while the latter went into consultation. Outside, meanwhile, the rest of the gang that had accompanied them was becoming increasingly fractious and was being continually augmented by supporters in St George's. The British procrastinated, suggests Candlin, probably because the deputy Governor McKenzie was unused to taking command.

French republican propaganda was important to the rebels in recruiting. The rebels, who identified strongly with the French Revolution, wore tricolour sashes and declaimed Liberté, equalité ou la mort ("liberty, equality or death") as their slogan, which was engraved on their brass helmets; when Fedon's own notepaper was later found, it was headed Liberté, Egalité, la Loi.

By the end of the week, the rebel ranks had swollen to over 7,000 people, comprising coloured and black freemen, whites and self-emancipated. Only a few hours into the rebellion—"with a combination of planning and good fortune", comments Martin—they captured the island's Governor, Ninian Home. This was not only a propaganda coup for the rebels but physically inhibited the British response to the rising by his enforced absence from leadership. Home, and many other hostages, were kept tied to a boucan frame for drying coffee. The rebels announced that any Frenchman who failed to join the insurrection would be deemed an enemy to the enterprise, outlawed and their goods confiscated. They also declared that any assault on their Belvidere base would result in the deaths of the hostages. The hostages were not ill-treated at this time, and indeed a vestige of class society still operated; for example, while most eat their meals off banana leaves, Home ate from a plate, and was occasionally allowed out of his chains in spite of his comrades' repeated assaults on Belvidere. However, Dr Hay reports that they suffered many indignities—sitting on the ground while it rained, for example—especially as the guard that watched over them comprised their own previously-held slaves.

=== British response ===
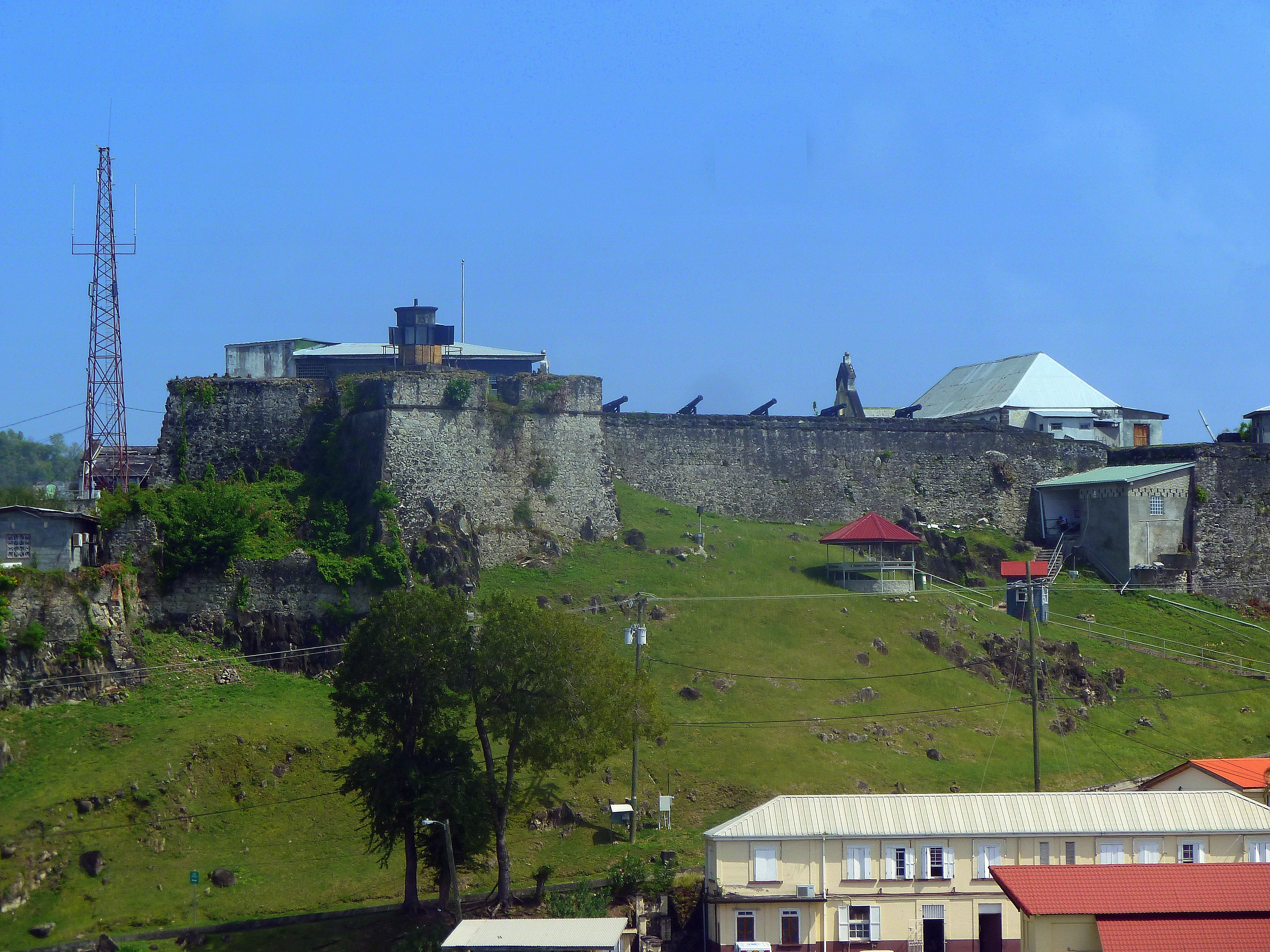
Fort St George, from where the British directed operations against Fedon, seen in 2012

The British, besieged in the south in the capital, St George's, were taken by surprise, and this frustrated their efforts at a concerted response. The British garrison comprised 190 troops and officers of the 9th and 58th Regiments of Foot, and a small section of Royal Artillery. About half of the garrison was unfit for duty due to illness. Although in disarray, when the rebels called upon the administration to dissolve itself, the British refused. Although Nogues' and Philip's negotiations with McKenzie lasted three hours, they left with nothing tangible to show for it, and it is likely that the deputy Governor expected reinforcements shortly. This belief enabled McKenzie to dismiss the rebels' demands, saying, "with some stoicism...that any British Governor, indeed any British subject, imprisoned or otherwise would rather die with honour than face the ignominy of surrendering an island to slaves. This was in spite of Home having written, under supervision, to the council urging them to give "serious consideration" to the rebel's proposals and urging to do what they could to save the hostages' lives, because, Home wrote, Fédon had made a "positive declaration" to kill hostages at some point. McKenzie offered a reward of 20 johannes to anyone who captured a rebel. (Note: A johanne was a Portuguese colonial gold coin weighing no less than seven pennyweights.)

Cox suggests that had the British launched a lightning raid on the rebels camp, they might have caught them sufficiently dispersed and disarrayed to grant the attackers a swift victory. The British issued a proclamation announcing an amnesty to all rebels who surrendered peaceably and returned to their duties. They also promised an "incredible" reward of 4,160 for the capture—dead or alive—of any rebel. (Note: Craton argues this was bound to be of little effect, as "the republican offer of freedom was much more attractive to the Grenadian slaves than the mere promise of an amnesty made by the regime". Even more, suggests Cox, it was likely to spur the rebels on to greater, in their view, things.) Grenada had been denuded of troops in 1794 in order to prosecute the war against the French on other islands. McKenzie wrote to London demanding reinforcements, emphasising the precarious nature of British rule following the rebellion:

Every moment of inactivity must increase the evil within, as the Negroes are daily joining the Insurgents and desolating the Estates; all of which have been plundered, and a number in the neighbourhood of St George's...have been burnt".

Brigadier-General Sir Colin Lyndsay was despatched to Grenada with 150 regular soldiers from Martinique, as was a force comprising reinforcements from Barbados and the sailors and marines from a passing British frigate. Also present were a number of Spanish soldiers sent by José María Chacón, Governor of Trinidad in what Candlin describes as a "rare show of foreign support". (Note: Grenada, although held by a foreign power, was important to the Spanish, as cotton produced in Trinidad was transported to Britain via Grenada, and Chacón, says Candlin, was as keen to stop the "contagion" of republicanism spreading as the British.). McKenzie had written to him at the same time as he had requested his domestic reinforcements, reminding Chácon it was "a moment pregnant with so much danger, as well to the Spanish, as the British colonies." (Note: Around the same time, the Spanish also helped the British administration in Jamaica suppress the Trelawny Maroons with hunting dogs.)

== Course of the rebellion ==
A few days into the rebellion, Fédon told his hostages that they need not expect swift rescue, as the rebels "were perfectly acquainted with the mode of making war in the woods". (Note: It is unknown, says Jacobs, precisely how Fédon garnered this knowledge, but it may be connected to a 1767 ordinance which instructed French and free coloureds—such as Fedon—to go into the woods and recapture escaped slaves. If so, argues Jacobs, the British "in trying to put the free coloureds against the [escaped slaves], only succeeded in exposing the free coloureds to the knowledge of 'making war in the woods'".) The rebels received further assistance from Hugues, in the form of armed squadrons, which had sufficient success to establish an administrative département under the rebels' direct control. Hugues, who had been outraged at the British proclamation, advised Fédon to execute his hostages if he suffered losses to the government, declaring the statement "an outrage against the rights of nations and humanity". A large number of slaves had by now joined the rebellion, either overtly or covertly: the former filled Fédon's ranks, while the latter were midnight arsonists, setting alight their ex-masters' plantations. (Note: Fédon had reportedly offered a reward to slaves who deserted or killed their owners and burned down their properties.) Regarding the latter, it was later reported that "this was the beginning of a conflagration which was lighted up every night by the negroes in different parts and in the end, desolated the whole island". White French and free-coloureds were armed with what rifles, muskets and bayonets were available while slaves were issued pikes and cutlasses. Although Fédon's army was clearly being augmented by many slaves from across the island, Cox notes that it is now impossible to ascertain whether this was due to ideological support or a fear of the consequences of not doing so. was joined by Candlin questions whether the burning of plantations was in Fédon's interests and suggests that, rather, the enslaved he freed as they marched were bent on the destruction of their places of captivity and imprisonment. He did not want a war of destruction, she says, yet was unable to prevent one, particularly in the early weeks of the campaign.

The rebellion, says Martin, "raged for 15 months, and saw extreme brutality and destruction" take place. Many of the white French rebels surrendered to the British as the rebellion increased in ferocity; they may have felt more endangered from the rebels than from the British. Most British planters deserted their estates for the towns, leaving both them and any faithful slaves at the mercy of the rebels. The British Army sustained continual losses, and the Chief Surgeon, called McGrigor, recorded "frightful" losses.

In the early days of the rebellion, comments Candlin, and in spite of the widespread destruction, "Fédon seemed to have kept a semblance of order or, at least, focus". Although the rebels massively outnumbered the British, Fédon's side lacked the experienced tacticians and strategists possessed by the British, and their assaults—while large-scale and brutal—were disorganised. Although controlled most of the countryside, Fédon's army was unable to displace the British from St George's, while the latter also had the advantage of superior sea power. This was used to great effect, eventually cutting Grenada off from its supply lines to St Lucia and Guadeloupe. (Note: Although not completely; schooners from Guadeloupe occasionally got through.) Meanwhile, Lyndsay marched inland and attacked the Belvidere estate. He was able to capture Fédon's house on 17 March after savage fighting, but then discovered that the main rebel camp was situated further up the hill. Campbell later wrote to Lord Cathcart that taking Camp Liberté seemed impossible, and how "the service was in storming the stronghold of the insurgents, which ended in proving which must of been the opinion of every military person before it commenced, a matter without any probability of success.

Sickness, mostly from Yellow fever, pervaded the British Army. (Note: In Colonial times and during the Napoleonic Wars, the West Indies were known as a particularly dangerous posting for soldiers due to yellow fever being endemic in the area. The mortality rate in British garrisons in Jamaica was seven times that of garrisons in Canada, mostly because of yellow fever and other tropical diseases. Between the years 1791 and 1797, across the entire archipelago, the army lost an average of 700 me a month to the fever; this was its worst losses in its history. The army was also ill-attuned to fighting guerilla jungle warfare: Sir John Moore, who both created the British light infantry and fought in St Lucia, said that European soldiers could never fight in a jungle. He put this weakness down to "poor diet, rum, a general lack of discipline and economy among the troops, and a dispirited and incompetent officer corps".) In April, a British Brigadier-General, Colin Lindsay, was so distraught with the fever that he left his camp, went out into the rain, and shot himself; although notes Craton, his position was worsened by "the nightmare of heat and mosquitoes, barbarous shouts and sudden volleys from hidden assailants".

Little activity from either side is known of between the initial rebel attacks and May 1795; the rebels may have spent their time consolidating the defences at Belvidere; Philip's brother was a trained mason, notes Candlin, and this would have been a particularly useful skill in this regard. The rebels were still disorganised, so intensive training was probably undertaken, while the presence of a large number of women and children made it necessary for them to be looked after. The British limited their actions to circulating bills around the anglophone community urging them to remember their duty as subjects of George III, while calling on the French-speaking populace to return to the fold. They may have been conserving their strength, suggests Cox, or perhaps deliberately avoiding Fédon's base in case he carried out his threat to the hostages. In March, a small but decisive engagement was fought at Madame Aché's plantation on Grand Etang, with the victory going to the rebels, while the British were also unable to clear them from Pilot Hill.

=== Attacks on Belvidere ===
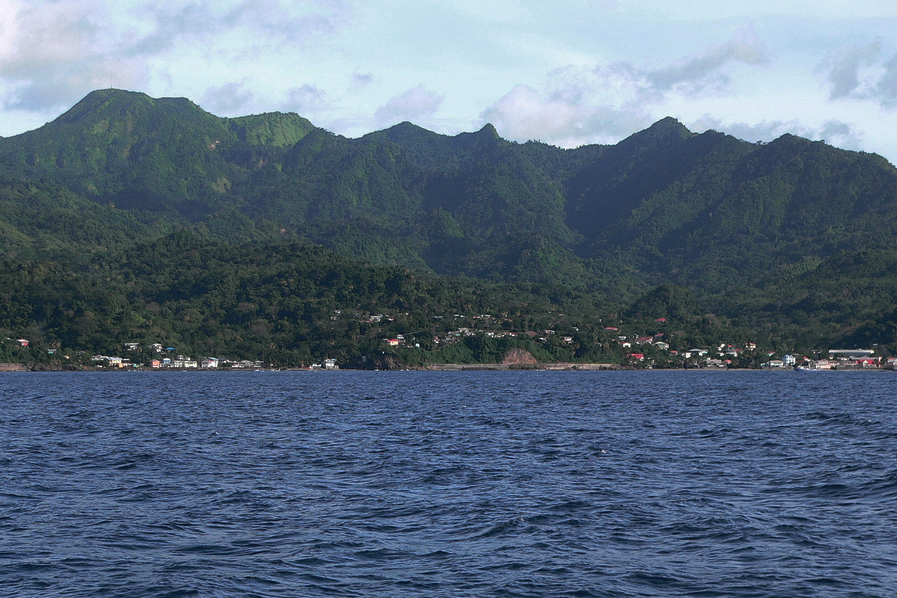
Grenada mountains, over which both parties fought, often transporting cannon with them

The British launched a number of assaults on the Belvidere Estate. The first was the day after Nogues' and Philip's visit to St George's, and the plan was to disperse Fedon's army before it could gather more adherents and become further entrenched. To this end, the militias of St Patrick's and St Andrew's parishes were raised with the aim of approaching Fédon from the east, north and west of the island. Demonstrating the seriousness of the situation argues Ashby, is the fact that the militia commanders were instructed, at their discretion, "to arm a number of able trusty negroes" at a time when the administration was in constant fear of those members of the population turning the aforesaid guns against their masters.

A force led by Captain Gurdon of the 58th landed at Gouyave, intending to march east to Belvidere. However—in what Ashby has termed a "tactical error"—instead of doing so immediately, he camped his force in town overnight. His men, in turn, proceeded to get plastered on "rum, wine and porter"; as a result, Ashby's role in the operation was called off. However, they were still called upon to fight. Somehow, the rebels had learned of Gurdon's presence in Gouyave and attacked the town with around 400 men. This attack, suggests Ashby, was probably designed to test the British strength and the defences for weak spots. Twelve rebels died to four defenders: Comments Ashby, "Apparently, the St. George's Militia distinguished themselves during the action, which sorely embarrassed the British officers because of their own men's drunkenness".

==== Strong drink ====
On the east of the island, the militia refused to make its way to Gurdon because of, as they saw it, "the hostile disposition of almost all the gangs of negroes, not to say the same of many whites in this quarter". By the time McKenzie had managed to persuade them to march out and meet Gurdon, over a day had been lost. And although Gurdon's force had been reinforced with sailors from HMS Quebec, both his men and the newly-arrived sailors had got drunk again and were in no position to campaign. In response, Gurdon marched them closer to Fédon's camp, where they would be denied access to further libations. His plan failed, however, when he discovered that, as he later noted in his official report, "contrary to my expectations, I found that the negroes brought rum to the men from every house or hut". Ashby suggests that, of the 50 Royal Marines from the Quebec, on 28 were capable of marching any distance. Eventually, the attempt on the Belvidere encampment was arranged for Sunday, 8 March. In the event, Gurdon considered it too well defended to be successfully stormed with the force at his disposal and the British returned to Gouyave. By this point, the militia was on the verge of revolt, so Gurdon deemed it tactical to withdraw to St George's. Gurdon's army was beset with discontent, with many considering their position outnumbered and helpless. Fights broke out in the ranks, and on one occasion, a private attempted to bayonet his captain. Another captain was urging the men to desert and the militia's doctor had already abandoned his post.

On 12 March, Colin Lindsay arrived in Grenada; he was followed by Schaw two days later. With them came men from the 9th and 68th Regiments of Foot. By 15 March they were ready to launch an all-out next attack on Belvidere, or Camp Liberté as the rebels had named it. Lyndsay led a troop of 400 men and militia and marched to Gouyave where he awaited marines from HMS Beaulieu and reinforcements from Le Grenadine. While Lyndsay paused, Fédon moved his hostages to the secure third level of his camp.

==== Attack of 20 March ====
Sir, Upwards of one half of the militia having left me, contrary to the most positive orders, I have been prevented from carrying my plans into execution; and as I shall not be able to act offensively until I have at least a number equal to those with which I set out, I thought it advisable to give the part of the militia that remained behind and who bore cheerfully much hardship from the extreme badness of the weather, leave to return to St. George's to refresh themselves, under the positive promise of them returning in two days; in which time it is to be hoped that the weather may prove more favourable for active operations...I must request a supply of blankets and shirts for my troops, as when they laid down their haversacks to engage the enemy, the negroes stole them.

— General Lindsay complains to McKenzie, 21 March 1795

At dawn on the 15th, Lindsay led 400 men and militia northwards out of St George's toward Gouyave—the rebels having evacuated on his approach—he awaited Royal Marines to be landed again. Although it is unknown for what reason, Lindsay kept his troops at Gouyave for another two days before marching westwards. About a mile from Fédon's camp, Lindsay rested the troop for two hours. This argues Ashby, was a mistake, as it wasted the final precious hours of daylight. Belvidere was once again not taken, and although a rebel outpost was captured, two men were lost in a bloody set-to doing so. Further operations were hampered by continuing rain, and Lindsay wrote to McKenzie on 21 March. While promising to be in the enemy camp "tomorrow", he also had a litany of complaint ranging from the (poor) quality of his forces to the weather, to thieving locals and the continued inebriation of much of his army. Two days later—"in a fit of temporary insanity", possibly brought on by fever—he blew his brains out.

=== British offensives ===
At this point Vaughan—then in Martinique—called off all British offensive operations until reinforcements could be despatched to Grenada. The outpost captured by Lindsay was to be maintained as an observation post by Schaw, and he was also to reinforce Gouyave. However, McKenzie believed that inactivity would be bad for the army and countermanded Vaughn's orders, despatching a force by sea under Schaw to reinforce Grenville. On their arrival, they came under artillery fire from Pilot Hill, killing one. Ashby estimates Fédon to have placed 200 men on Pilot Hill to accompany two pieces of cannon; this was too strong a defensive position to be taken by Schaw's smaller force. Schaw wrote to McKenzie, complaining that he and his men were "here without any provisions or bread, and there are scarce any plantains to be found". He also highlighted how sickness was ravaging his troops, "a considerable number [of whom] with sore legs". (Note: Axually, comments Ashby, it later became apparent that the rebels only had two companies of men on Pilot Hill, and they were running out of ammunition: Gurdon's retreat had "again proved unfortunate for the British cause".)

An escapee from Fédon's camp informed the administration that, with around 7,000 people a day to feed—which itself took between eight and ten cattle to achieve daily—Fedon's army was starting to run out of supplies as well as meteriél. At the same time, Abercromby, in Barbados defeated Goyrand in St Lucia. Bringing that island under control was a tactical necessity, as there was little point in attempting an invasion of Grenada until it was cut off from its supply lines. A number of French ships were captured attempting to import arms. Those on board were taken prisoner except in one case when a deserter from the militia was discovered; he was hanged in St George's market place. A number of small rebel positions were attacked and overran, including Paradise Negro-House, Pilot House and Telescope Hill, but Gurdon's position on the latter gave him a view from which he established that an assault on Belvidere could lose him up to two-thirds of his men. Furthermore, although now in possession of Pilot Hill, he doubted he could hold it for any period of time, so he withdrew that night.

Attack of 8 April

Main page- Battle of Belvedere estate

On the 8th of April 1795, the Coloured militia, led by Louis Cazot LaGrenade attacked Belvidere/Belvedere with 200 men, this attack however failed, although some speculate it was nearly successful, and was the turning point in Fédon’s mind which made him execute the hostages.

=== Murder of the hostages ===
Despite having sworn to kill the hostages if Belvidere was attacked, it had now been assaulted twice without their having been harmed, indicating their value to Fédon. Eventually, though, he lost patience. In retaliation for the attack on Belvidere on the 8, April 1795—and perhaps indicating how close it had come to victory—Fédon had the 44 of his 47 hostages killed: "one by one", comments Candlin, "the prisoners were dragged from the coffee store into the estate courtyard and shot, their blood mingling with the muddy, rain-soaked ground and running in great streams off the hillside". (Note: Joachim Philip's brother Nicholas had been responsible for guarding the prisoners, and he was also in charge of their execution, including the provision of a coup de grace when necessary.) This number included the island's Governor, Ninian Home, upon whose killing Marie Rose Fédon observed with a "cold indifference", as Dr Hay later wrote, or a "protean detachment" according to Brizan. The Fédons' daughter, also Marie Rose, may also have been an onlooker. (Note: In his account, Brizan suggests that two of Fédon's daughters watched the executions and that Jean B. Cotton personally split the skulls of the dead with a cutlass to make sure none survived.) Another victim was one James Campbell, who had originally sold Fédon the Belvidere estate in 1791 and was also close to Ninian Home. The dead were buried in a mass grave, but this was dug into by rooting pigs. The survivors were sent to Guadeloupe and into Hugues' custody.

Among those whom Frédon allowed living was the "much-loved" Parson McMahon—who may have been personally known to Fédon—a Dr Hay, and a fellow named Kerr. Dr Hay was spared because, as a medical doctor, his skills would come in handy to the rebels; it is also probable, suggest Candlin and Pybus, that this was a quid pro quo for his generous treatment of Marie Rose following her arrest. Little is known of Kerr, although he may have been married to the daughter of a local French chevalier. It is also unknown why he was spared, is unknown, but in his memoirs, Dr Hay asserted that Kerr was probably a rebel spy among the hostages.

==== May 1795 ====
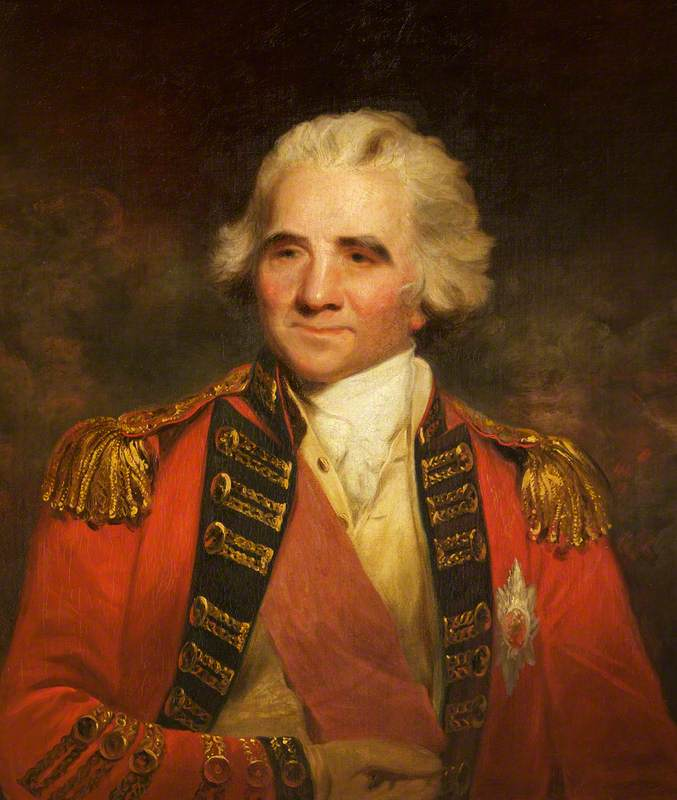
Sir Ralph Abercromby by John Hoppner, c. 1798.

In May 1795, the British launched a surprise night-attack on Fédon's Belvidere base. Due to Lindsay's suicide, the command had fallen to his inexperienced subordinate, Colonel Schaw. The British troops, in particular, were weakened by sickness, and this lost them the element of surprise they had relied on for victory.

As the Belvidere Estate was situated on elevated ground, the British were at a severe tactical disadvantage. It was divided into three sections; the lowest as the estate proper, the next was his personal camp, and above that Mount Qua Qua. Further, the rebels had spent the preceding weeks fortifying it with a number of levels of defence. (Note: The defences were good enough that, later on, British officers assumed that they had to have been a long time in the preparation.) The layers were named. The lowest—known as Fraternité—held the majority of the rebel army, including artillery—which due to a lack of cannonballs, were loaded with sugar wedges wrapped in sacking—behind a complex of earthworks. These consisted of defiles intended to lure the British into ambush. Above that was Liberté, which contained the estate buildings itself and the rebel headquarters. The third and last camp—Morte—was by way of being a redoubt at the last line of defence. Fédon moved the hostages to the upper camp, while demanding that Governor Home force McKenzie to make a peace: "Ah, tyrant Home; you are now my prisoner. You must cause the [British] forts to be delivered up". By now though, suggests Brizan, Home had become lethargic as to his fate, replying "I am a prisoner and have no longer any power in the colony. I am resigned to my fate whatever you may make it".

In torrential rain, the British attacked from several directions simultaneously, supported by both cannon and cavalry. After intense hand-to-hand combat, the British army got to the gates of Morte redoubt. Dr Hay was responsible for the rebels' medical station in Liberté. Fédon's brother, Jean-Pierre, was killed in the intense fighting. and Fédon later suggested that no quarter was given the rebels. The attack, however, had dissipated by morning. The failure was the result, says Candlin, of "poor coordination, coupled with bad weather and mere bad luck"; Jacobs describes the operation as "bungled". The British lost 27 men dead and 57 wounded.

==== Hiatus ====
The assault on Belvidere and the killings of the hostages was followed, comments Candlin, by a "bizarre year-long standoff" during which both sides prepared for a war of attrition while probing each others' strength in occasional skirmishing. During this time, whites that remained in rural areas escaped, where they could, to the towns. On Fédon's part, this was because he had neither the troops nor the resources to maintain an army in the field for any length of time, although he was joined by a number of English-speaking slaves from British estates, as well, he boasted, as number of British soldiers whom he promised "faithfully offer all those that will follow their example the same good treatment". Time was originally against the British, who would bleed men and morale without reinforcements. The British, says military historian Martin R. Howard, had been "surprised by the obduracy of their mostly black adversaries...admitting that Fédon's men were capable of putting up stiff resistance", while William Dyott noted that they were not only resilient but mobile with it. On one occasion, the British were mortified, says Howard, to capture 500 rebels with "not a single white soldier among them". Sir John Moore wrote how

Their attachment and fidelity to the cause is great; they go to death with indifference. One man the other day denied, and persevered in doing so, that he had ever been with them or knew anything of them. The instant before he was shot he called out "vive le république".

During this period, argues Cox, the helplessness of the British position was exposed to all; they were awaiting men and supplies that were gradually reached them by sea. During these months, says Dubois, with the British confined to St George's, Fédon's followers "pillaged and destroyed the abandoned plantations on the rest of the island". This enabled Fédon to feed the increasing number of people who now dwelt at Camp Liberté. McKenzie continued to fortify St George's until it was almost as formidable a port as English Harbour in Antigua. He decided to conserve his forces and retreat to urban areas and forts, but by doing so, suggests Walvin, he allowed Fédon effectively to create a "state within a state". McKenzie recognised, however, that he was no soldier and could not expect troops to obey him as if he was their general. (Note: McKenzie was not only a civilian, wrote Campbell later, but his methods were also "too Austrian".) He wrote to Vaughn on 9 April that, regretfully

The plans I have formed for the restoration of tranquillity were the best which I could devise but they have been uniformly defeated by some sinister accident. My profession is not arms and of course, it cannot be expected that the army will act under me with that vigour and confidence which they would feel when commanded by an experienced general.

MacKenzie was also forced to rely on credit to bring in supplies from other islands. For most of the rest of the year, Fédon relied on guerilla tactics, so avoiding pitched battles. Towards the end of the year, the arrival of further French supplies enabled the rebels to launch an island-wide offensive. He drove the white militia out of Gouyave (capturing a unit of Loyal Black Rangers in doing so) and overran Grenville again, this time establishing batteries with which to bombard the patrolling British ships. Then in February 1796, the rebels captured Mount St Eloi, to the north of St George's; soon after, however, on the 27th, the British stormed and captured Post Royal Hill on the east coast. This had the effect of acting as a future landing stage for reinforcements and driving the rebels back into the interior.

The failure of the attack on St George's meant that the British remained in control of the most important strategic site on the island, and to where they could be regularly revictualled. Fédon, meanwhile, remained in command of most of the island. His army needed feeding, but he had no effective strategy for this and mainly relied on hand-to-mouth pillaging of by now-deserted estates. Although originally a rich vein of succour, these estates—by now producing nothing due to the war—were gradually becoming less and less profitable for the rebels. This was reflected generally: says Candlin, "the island's produce was destroyed, there were no crops and the economy completely collapsed".

Following the suicide of Lindsay, he was replaced by Brigadier-General Oliver Nicolls who brought 1,000 men and over-ran Pilot Hill in early May; (Note: Nicolls was not only an experienced soldier but knew Grenada already, having been stationed there in command of the 45th Regiment decade earlier during the governorship of Edward Matthew) Gurdon was killed in one of the skirmishes. At the same time, HMS Mermaid captured two French ships and the 250 marines on board. However, Yellow Fever continued to ravage the British Army, which by summer 1795 had lost two-thirds of its regulars to the disease; further, large numbers of the white militia also deserted. By the start of 1796 Craton has estimated that the militia stood at 281 active men (when it had been 535 the same time the previous year). There was some good news for McKenzie; the creation of a Loyal Black Ranger Corp had proved popular as an auxiliary force and now comprised 5 companies of 60 men and 25 officers. (Note: Recruited in direct response to Fédon's swelling slave army, the Loyal Black Rangers were offered freedom in return for their service. Craton argues that "ironically, without these faithful black auxiliaries, who...already outnumbered the rest of the militia, Grenada would have fallen entirely to Fédon's forces", and Dubois describes them as "crucial" to the British war effort.) However, despite the sea embargo, the rebels were able to land two ships from St Lucia which provided 200 French troops.

== Support ==
=== External ===
The rebels maintained a world view of events, and a comment from one of Fedon's deputies acknowledges this: "Liberty can never be confined solely to the dominions of France, but must gradually extend to every corner of the globe, when it will the interest of mankind to unite and totally terminate that perfidious race". Communication was maintained with fellow revolutionaries in Haiti, Guadaloupe and St Lucia, although this was a somewhat "uneasy relationship", suggests Martin, as Fédon, on the one hand, wanted as much assistance as he could receive, but on the other was wary of allowing external forces too much influence within his movement. (Note: Much of what is known of the growing distance between Fédon and Hugues comes to scholars from the later memoirs of Dr Hay, who was sent to Guadeloupe after the execution of the hostages.) In June 1794 Victor Hugues had been sent by the National Convention to promulgate the Decree of 16 Pluvôise, which—"reluctantly and belatedly", says William Doyle—abolished slavery in all French colonies. Making his base in Guadeloupe, Hugues' mission part of a French strategy to both regain her colonies earlier lost to Britain and from Britain capture new territories. This would be achieved by organising those who already had a historic French connection, and those whose populations were dissatisfied under British rule: Grenada, says Jacobs, "qualified on both counts". As a result Hugues was particularly vociferous in spurring the Fédons on, but found he had little sway over Fédon, whom he called hot-headed. Fédon, though, increasingly ignored the exhortations of his comrades elsewhere to unity and enforced his own strategy and discipline. Fédon and Philip both had siblings who had emigrated to Trinidad prior to the rebellion and it is probable that they also provided external support for the rebels; one brother-in-law, Michael Belleran, organised a support network from there.

In Guadeloupe, Hugues, says Dubois, "issued a declaration of all-out war against the British", declaring that they were trying to crush the rights of man and the "brave and loyal Republicans" upholding them. It seems likely, says Martin, that while French revolutionaries elsewhere in the Caribbean wanted more direct involvement in Fédon's rebellion, he went to lengths to limit their active participation because "he did not want checks on his own authority". He suggests, furthermore, that this backing was "vital to the success of the rebellion, and it proved detrimental when British forces succeeded in cutting it off". (Note: Which they managed to do, says Candlin, despite having no small ships available to patrol the sea. However, there were sufficient ships of the line in the area to ensure an effective blockade of Grenada, as the Royal Navy had maintained a presence in the Caribbean since the Seven Years' War.) It may be that Fédon did not feel the need for Hugues' reinforcements, as his army had swollen with coloureds and slaves. Hugues, who had instructed Fédon and the Republic army to obey the laws of war at all times, appears to have distanced himself from Frédon after the latter began executing his prisoners. It is possible, however, that the degree of support the revolutionaries offered to Fédon has been exaggerated. Murphy notes that there are no surviving letters to or from Fédon in Hugues' extant archive, and few mentions of events in Grenada at all. (Note: An anonymous contemporary opponent of Hugues wrote that he had granted commissions to "trois mulâtres chassés de cette isle pour dettes" and that Hugues then "avait abandonné cette tentative à elle-même pendant l'espace de huit mois sans rien faire pour la soutenir". (Three mullatos driven from the island over debt, and that he abandoned Granada after 8 months, doing nothing further.))

=== Internal dissention ===
From almost the point the rebellion had been declared, rifts appeared in the ranks. In the first week, a mutinous rebel shot Lavalette, and was then himself ordered executed by Fédon. Martin suggests that internal relations went downhill rapidly on account of the rebels' failure to swiftly overcome the British forces. Nogues, too, seems to have fallen out with the leadership relatively quickly; although an original member of the Commission of 24, he left it soon after the rebellion broke out. Martin notes that the causes of Nogues' falling out with Fédon is now unknown, but in a letter to Fédon, Goyrand urged him to strive for unity:

We are pained to see how divided you are; the enemy will hear of it, and will take advantage of it to fall upon you and defeat you. Let ambition give way to love of the Republic. It is impossible for you all to be in charge; obey those who command you and do not force us to use harsh measures against you. Listen to our appeals, they are for your own good.

Gaspar Goyrand, in St Lucia, wrote that he had heard that "several individuals have desired to act a part in this revolution, who, from a spirit of jealousy, of ambition, or the insanity of pride, have endeavoured to revive prejudices condemned to profound oblivion". He reminded Fédon that, for as long as his "ambition [is] to wear epaulettes" rather than unite his army, he was hurting the rebellion's chances. For his part, Hugues seems to have disapproved of Fédon's treatment of the hostages: in April 1795 he sent a ship to bring them from Grenada to Guadeloupe, but by then—with the exception of Hay, McMahon and Kerr—they had all been killed. As a result of the disagreements between Fédon and Hugues, the rebellion effectively split into two parties, physically and ideologically. The French Republicans were based at Belvidere, while the Grenadians operated out of Gouyave. Resources were also a source of contention within the rebel leadership. At one point, possibly around the time Gurdon missed the opportunity to take Pilot Hill, Nogues wrote to Fédon complaining that Nogues' repeated requests for ammunition had gone unfulfilled:

Citizen—To the several demands which I have made for ammunition, you have given me for an answer that you could not send any. Recollect that the powder belongs to the Republic, as well as ourselves. I must tell you, that ammunition ought not to be refused to a chief whom the Republic has invested with its powers.

Divisions within the leadership may have been exacerbated, suggests Candlin, as much by the independence of the slaves and the position they forced the rebels into as much as anything the British administration could do.

=== Summoned by Goyrand ===
The two rebel groups, while fighting a common enemy, had increasingly distinct commands. This came to a head in October 1795, when Goyrand finally took action against Fédon. Goyrand ordered the dissolution of the Commission of 24 and summoned Fédon to Guadeloupe. Nogues had brought charges against Fédon, and Goyrand was investigating, but Fédon failed to appear. As a result, he was stripped of his command of the French revolutionary troops in Grenada he had been sent, although he maintained his control of the freedmen and slaves.

== Rebel government ==
Idleness being a Vice contrary to the Spirit Of the Government, the Energy of the Government, being to watch over the happiness Of the Social Contract, It is therefore the Duty Of the Government to work at extirpating this odious Vice of Idleness. The Eye of the Chief has penetrated into the forests, and instead of wild beasts, has seen there Citizens living separate from the Society of men. The Law does not know man, whom Society does not know. All those who live at a distance from others, are suspicious in her (sic) Eyes, She cannot look upon them as her legitimate Children. A Vagabond is a dangerous Monster, every man useless to the Republic ought to be treated as such, the Action of the honest man are public Acts, usefull (sic) to the Republic, as well as himself. Now, he who lives retired and concealed does no public Actions, whose Actions are not useful to the public Cause, and from that time he must be considered as a suspicious and dangerous man, this is a man whom Government must prosecute with all the Rigour of the laws in order to make him useful to the common happiness[...]

— Ordinance of the Police, signed by Fédon on 12 Brumaire, Year IV (2 November 1795)

During their occupation of Gouyave by the rebels—who made it their capital—the town was renamed French: Port Libre (Free Port), from where a rudimentary government was established. Here, for the dispensing of revolutionary justice, a guillotine was set up; its victims consisted mostly of ex-slaves who either deserted, expressed views favourable to the old regime or were otherwise deemed counter-revolutionary. (Note: On one occasion, reports Hay, "eight negroes were guillotined in one day for eating mules".) Among other enactments, slavery was abolished and allegiance to the French Republic was declared. Fédon appears to have managed to create a fledgeling bureaucracy during this period of relative calm. Jacobs notes that at the height of the rebels' campaign, Fédon had clearly attempted to restructure society along the lines of revolutionary France: inhabitants were citoyens and were instructed to live as part of the Republic of France, as part of the body politic, rather than outside it, as many were still doing, in the forests. Among the legislation Fedon's administration enacted was the Ordinance of Police which instructed all forest-dwellers to return to the towns and thereby, suggest Jacobs, returning to "useful service under the Republic". The fact that Fédon felt the need to make such an appeal, suggests Candlin, indicates the extent to which some freed slaves refuted the authority of both French revolutionary rule and British sovereignty.

== Renewal of hostilities ==
In August 1795, the administration had requested and received, a 10,400,886 loan with which to fund the revolt's suppression. Similar requests followed, with increased frequency. Late December 1795 saw a renewed British offensive. On 17 December In January 1786, the Grenville garrison was attacked by a larger rebel force, killing two British officers. The town was besieged for a week before the rebels withdrew to Marquis. Nicolls reported to Dundas that the rebels had not been particularly effective:

They got a Gun to bear on the blockhouse, which was soon silenced; they made some attempts to cut off communication between Pilot Hill and the town of [Grenville] which have been equally frustrated, and their guns taken and destroyed and thrown over the cliff into the sea by Sallies from the Garrison.

However, the rebels were able to bring two large schooners' worth of men and guns into Marquis Bay. This prompted Nicolls to write again requesting reinforcements from home and emphasising the strategic importance of Pilot Hill. By early January, these forces were ready to sail to Grenada. The Foreign Secretary, Henry Dundas, wrote to Abercromby informing him that:

By the first week in April a division of not less than 4,000 British infantry will be ready to sail from England, Ireland and Gibraltar, which I trust will be found sufficient to replace all the losses which the army may experience during the Campaign.

On 17 February, rebel schooners captured a sloop under contract to the British government, the Hostess Quickly, which was attempting to land supplies for the Pilot Hill post. By this point, says Ashby, British forces on the island were "growing increasingly vulnerable to the well-supplied enemy". Nicholls complained to London that, had he had reinforcements, they may have avoided recent setbacks such as the loss of the sloop. On another occasion, a British ship had been cannoned from a rebel emplacement on Telescope Hill. By now, complained Nicolls, he had less than 700 fit and able men to command, and these were barely enough to maintain the defensive positions they held. Without reinforcements, he finished, and "painful as it is, I must leave Pilot Hill to its fate, a most disturbing thing, but unavoidable". By now Fédon had managed to place 11 artillery stations around Pilot Hill, and this prevented any further British landing. Nonetheless, a last attempt was made on 27 February: HMS Mermaid sent its launch in, followed by a gun boat, the Jack. The launch was sunk by rebel artillery, and the Jack ran on to the rocks where it had perforce to be abandoned along with its 18-pound cannon, smaller guns and a large amount of ammunition.

By now low on water and supplies, the decision was taken to evacuate Pilot Hill. Major Wright, 42 British and 264 black soldiers made their way through a besieging force of around 1,500 rebels. Two men two wounded to carry had to be left behind, along with a large quantity of cannon and other weaponry. Ashby describes their escape—without loss—as "miraculous". By March 1796, the government had abandoned a number of posts and the rebels had captured several others; Brizan suggests that "there was no doubt that at this time five parishes were firmly under Fédon's control. St George's alone eluded his grasp." However, by early 1796, Fédon's army, says Cox, faced the consequences of their policy from the previous year of burning and pillaging the island's estates. This had, in the short term, fed the army and its supporters, but no further cultivation had taken place and a food shortage began. Furthermore, he had, by occupying so many outposts, overextended his supply lines, and the British were aware of this. (Note: Candlin suggests that the rebellion was a victim of its own success, as the fact that food began running out may indicate that Fedon might not have expected it to have been so popular with the slave populace as it turned out to be. That there was a food supply problem may also be indicated by the death penalty that a number of Fédon's army received for eating mules without permission.)

== Arrival of British reinforcements ==
Grenada now became the focus of British military operations in the West Indies; Jacobs writes how Saint-Domingue, "the colony in which the British had sacrificed thousands of soldiers in order to wrest it from France, was consigned to the background". In March 1796 Nicolls launched an assault on the Grenville-Marquis area. The rebels were forced in battle and eventually expelled from the area after losing around 300 men. Fédon was wounded and his force retired to the mountains surrounding Grand Etang and Belvidere. In the meantime British authorities had been organising an expeditionary force under Major-general Sir Ralph Abercromby to take back the island. It was by now long overdue; although Abercromby had been appointed to command the expeditionary force in June 1795, a series of mishaps (Note: Both natural disasters, including the fleet being broken up by storms and vacillation by the British Admiralty, which countermanded its own orders several times, helped to delay the transports. Abercromby had been stationed in Gibraltar and his recall exposed it to Spanish attacks.) had prevented a number of departures from the south of England. The expeditionary force arrived in Barbados, the designated mustering point from which to invade Grenada, in June 1796. Abercromby was a highly capable officer (Note: A strong supporter of the American Revolution, Abercromby had moved to Ireland in order to avoid being sent to fight against the Americans. When war with France broke out in 1793, he was appointed commander of a brigade under the Duke of York for service in the Flanders campaign, where Abercromby commanded the allied vanguard in a battle at Le Cateau. During the allied withdrawal to the Dutch Republic in late 1794, he commanded the allied forces at the Battle of Boxtel and was wounded directing operations at Fort St Andries on the Waal. Abercromby was later appointed as an aide-de-camp to George III.) and his arrival meant the British forces outnumbered the rebels by about 10 to 1.

500 British regulars of the 10th, 25th and 88th Regiments of Foot under General MacKenzie arrived from Barbados to reinforce the troops on Grenada. When Nicolls inspected MacKenzie's troops he found many of them sick and had to send them to the hospital., Nicolls claimed to other British officials that to launch an effective offensive he needed at least 500 more troops, and another 700 regulars from the 3rd, 8th and 63rd Regiments of Foot arrived at Grenada on the East Indiaman Ponsborne on 13 March. Ashby suggests that by now "British fortunes... seemed to have taken a turn for the better" as around this time they also recaptured Hostess Quickly from the rebels in Marquis and hung those found aboard her. Nicols ordered a night march on the rebel base, which was not as successful as he hoped. One of the officers who took part, Lieutenant-Colonel Dyott, later wrote that "although one half of the distance was a tolerably good road, we were near ten hours getting eight miles, and that not without much confusion". (Note: Dyott also noted that the Loyal Black Rangers kept themselves amused by shooting "some wretched poor devils in the cane fields" whom Ashby supposes to have been innocent slaves rather than rebels.)

== Collapse of the rebellion ==
The arrival of reinforcements led to a number of British attacks on rebel positions, which were gradually overtaken piecemeal. On at least one occasion, said Dyott, as the rebels fled, British cavalry "made dreadful slaughter with their swords on the enemy that were endeavouring to make their escape", although he also says that "it was some time dubious how the affair would end". In early May, an attack on Post Royal saw around 300 rebels killed and 500 escaping, including Fédon; British losses were six officers and 40 men. A temporary stalemate existed while the British awaited further reinforcements, as sickness was as much an enemy as the rebels. The army also experienced a small number of desertions. Dyott reports how "three villains (Dutchmen) deserted from the 25th regiment to the enemy. One of them was afterwards taken at Gouyave, and we had him hung up on the highest tree we could find without ceremony."

On 28 May Sir John Hope arrived in St George's; he also reported the recent British capture of St Lucia. This was welcome news to the British administration of Grenada, as it meant that troops could now be diverted from St Lucia to assist against the rebellion. Dyott describes the difficulties of the final 21-hour march on Fédon's headquarters:

Our march for the last three miles was literally up and down precipices, half-way up the leg in clay, and through a wood where I believe no human foot had ever before stepped. A party from the enemy had attacked our advanced guard, and disputed the ground we halted upon, but they made no stand; however, they annoyed us all evening with their bush fighting from the woods with which we were surrounded, and killed and wounded several men."

Around this time Abercromby wrote to London that when he found Fédon, "his Force is supposed not to exceed 300 Men, without any regular Supply of Provisions, but in a Situation very difficult of Access". Candlin estimates that it took only a fortnight to rout Fédon's rebel army and regain the island. After a short exchange in which there were no British casualties, the 200-strong French republican force in Gouyave under Captain Jossey de Tournecy surrendered to Nicolls on 10 June. There were six articles of surrender, and included the return of the non-free to slavery. Fédon's army, still in the field and composed almost exclusively of this demographic was otherwise not mentioned in the surrender of Jossey's men. (Note: One of the conditions of Jossey's surrender was that he and his men were treated as prisoners of war rather than rebels.) Jossey's surrender marked the end of both revolutionary France's engagement in Grenada and its support of Fédon's rebellion. (Note: Jacobs notes that the Decree of Pluvôise remained on the French statute book—codifying as it did France's relationship with its colonies—until its revocation by Napoleon in 1801.) It is unknown, notes Jacobs, whether Fédon was aware of his ally's intention of surrendering before Jossey did so, although much of the revolutionary army seems to have melted away under cover of darkness and joined Fédon's forces in the interior.

=== Attack on Camp Liberté ===
By this time, however, Fédon seems to have been running low on supplies in Belvidere; a contemporary reported that the ensconced rebels had "a number of Cattle, but plantains...fall short, and they have not Salt". With the defeat of Fédon's revolutionary allies both within and outside Grenada, suggests Jacobs, Fédon's own defeat was only a "matter of time". (Note: Victor Hugues, although undefeated had been "holed up" in Guadeloupe and effectively neutralised.) by the British Abercromby, leading the 57th Regiment of Foot approached Fédon's base from the west, launching his attack from the Grand Roy Valley. Stealth units, composed of a number of Jägers approached the Belvidere encampment from the north. On 12 June, his force encountered two rebel deserters, who claimed that Fédon's camp was in great confusion and that desertion was rife. This view, suggests Ashby, was reinforced the following day when Fédon sent an emissary under the flag of truce offering terms; Fédon offered to surrender his base if he and his officers—but not the men—be allowed to retire to Guadeloupe. Abercromby personally rejected the offer. Further, he not only forbade any further negotiations with the rebels but offered a reward of equivalent to £48,884 in 2025 for Fédon, dead or alive. Sickness was returning to the ranks, however, and this was compounded by a lack of food and drink. Dyott reports how soldiers were "dropping down from hard duty and from the inclemency of the worst climate in the universe, and for twenty-four hours nothing to eat or drink". Hope himself succumbed to the fever and had to be convalesced back to St George's. Although the troops were ordered to attack at 3 AM on the morning of 17 June, they were unable to do so as expected provisions had yet failed to arrive. Campbell initially refused to advance until his men had at least two days' supplies, although in the event he relented after food and rum was found for one breakfast, and they set off four hours late.

During the night of 18 June, the attackers—deliberately leaving their campfires burning below—crept up the mountain in small groups to evade detection. They isolated and neutralised rebel outposts as they moved. In order to climb the steep inclines of the mountainside, troops used their swords as scaling ladders. Dyott described the light infantry as "scrabbling through the woods, getting behind trees and taking a potshot when they could get an opportunity". In a number of assaults, the attackers suffered 65 casualties, but the following day they breached the third of Fédon's hillside redoubts with little resistance. Marie Rose Fédon was probably killed in the fighting, while Fédon killed the last remaining prisoners. This strengthened inordinately the British desire to hunt him down, comments Craton: they were British soldiers, who had been captured on foraging expeditions, and were found stripped, tied up and shot. An observer noted that the presence of the Jäger battalion (Note: The Jägers were, in Jacobs' words, "a crack mercenary unit comprised of German and Dutch soldiers of fortune". Brizan describes them as "specially trained fighters, skilled in...mountain war".) inspired particular fear in the rebels, "who generally made short work of them, and gave them no quarter". As a result, rather than be captured, many rebels, including Fédon, threw themselves down the hillside to escape. (Note: This was a traditional means of avoiding capture by the enemy through suicide among Grenadian indigants, and had been known of since the European conquest of Grenada in the 17th century.) Fedon's army experienced great losses; the government army, on the other hand, lost nine dead and 55 wounded. The mopping-up operation—what Nicols called being "in search of the Monsters in every direction"—began immediately; in one of his final despatches from Grenada, Abercromby informed London that "there appeared a general Disposition in the Revolted to submit; and to throw themselves upon the Mercy of the British Government".

=== Fédon's fate ===
Jacobs notes that "many revolutönaries preferred death to slavery and leapt off the mountain stronghold to their deaths". Fédon was officially last seen on 27 June 1796, and may have been among those who did so; although whether he actually died is unknown. Craton suggests that it was from this point that he and those with him were transformed from "revolutionary soldiers into legendary outlaws", and this was due at least in part to the fact that he had avoided an ignominious death at the hands of the government. (Note: Fédon's hide-out was sparse. Craton describes what the soldiers found when they broke in: "only three pairs of boots, some mountain cabbage, and a few sugar canes. Nearby were a few muskets, carpenters' tools, and the skeleton of a canoe that the rebels had been building.") Nine days later the Grenadians in Belvidere surrendered. By the end of the rebellion, the British presence in Grenada has been estimated at 5,000 men, and, comments Candlin, "clearly by the end of the conflict Fedon's dreams of becoming a republican general and governor of the island were in tatters".

Fédon's fate is unknown, comments Candlin, "only a compass in an upturned rowboat tantalizing" scholars as to his end. The fact that the boat was pointing towards Trinidad when it was found suggested to contemporaries that he had drowned attempting to join his sister there. Brizan supports the argument that Fédon died en route to Trinidad, in a boat unfit for the journey. The Spanish administration of Trinidad was so disorganised, say Candlin and Pybus, that this would not have been as difficult as it may seem. Dubois also believes Fédon to have escaped the island. A report as late as 1815, from Sir Ralph Woodford, Governor of Trinidad, that Fédon had been recently sighted in Cuba. However, the Spanish government disallowed an investigation. Candlin inclines to the theory that—"Given the interconnectedness of relatives in Trinidad and Grenada"—it is most likely that he survived and went into hiding in the former, while Jacobs suggests that he escaped to Cuba. Wherever he was, suggests Craton, he was presumably "living incognito and waiting for his chance to return and lead the ultimate rebellion". The failure to capture Fédon both enhanced his mythical status among the freed coloureds and slaves and created a long-term sense of insecurity for the white population, who lived in a semi-constant state of fear of his return. The £500 reward for his capture was never claimed.

The British had regained control of most of the island, and now, comments Martin, "the might of the British Empire descended". The effectiveness of the British assault led to large losses among the slaves, and by this point, Fédon and his colleagues would have been focussing their energies in escaping Grenada, suggest Candlin. He had a number of near misses from being captured. A British official later recorded that, on the last such occasion, Fédon launched himself "down a place where [no man] dare venture after him. His object and that of the few remaining in the woods was to get off in a canoe. We have...destroyed several that were preparing for that purpose". Even so, notes Walvin, it took the British another 18 months to restore order and seek out remaining rebels.

== Consequences ==
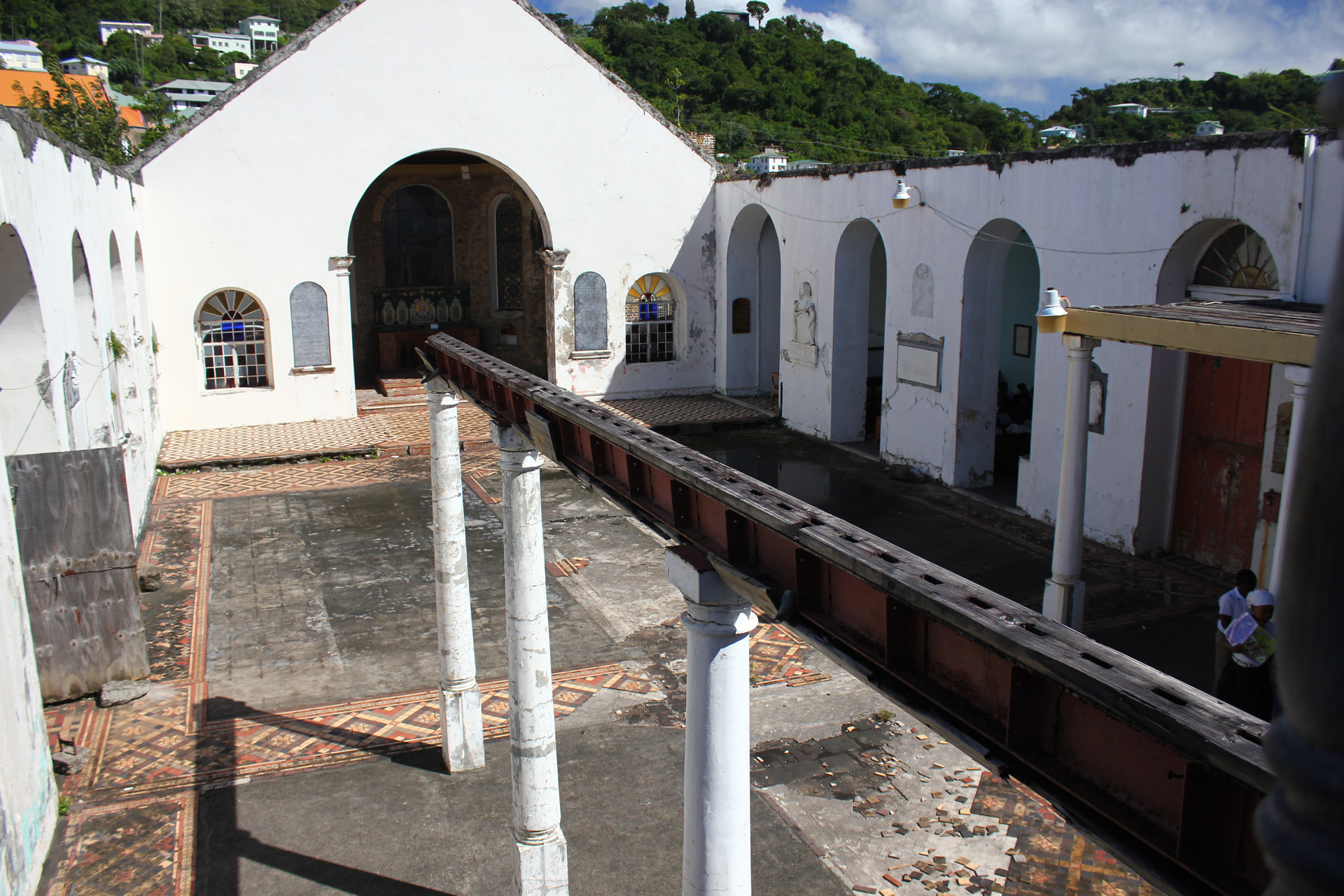
St. George's Anglican Church, illustrating the plaques commemorating Fédon's victims

Following the collapse of the rebellion, a bill of attainder was promulgated which condemned 400 people. (Note: The Act was officially titled "'An Act to attaint certain Persons therein Named of High Treason unless they shall render themselves and submit to Justice on or before the first day of September One thousand seven hundred and ninety five".) Two hundred rebels were enslaved and 50 executed, suffering hanging and then decapitation, with some being gibbeted at St Eloi Point as a warning to approaching ships. Slaves who were captured had generally been hanged where they had been found; 38 rebel leaders and free coloureds were taken to the towns, where, after a "nominal" trial, suggests Craton, they were publicly executed and their heads paraded through St George's and other towns. Most whites were eventually reprieved. A few were exiled to South America, although Candlin suggests that, such had been the losses to the slave population, the British could not afford to lose many more abroad. Overall, approximately 25% of the island's slave population—around 7,000 people—died during the revolt. Another 500—charged with being in possession of arms—were sold off the island. Many, however, seem to have remained free, or unmolested; Dr Hay commented in his later report that when he eventually returned from Guadeloupe, he was "dismayed by the numbers of the enslaved who had taken up casual residence in the town". Bills were issued requesting slave owners to report the names and numbers of their runaway or missing slaves, and appointed commissioners to establish compensation and oversee the sale of the rebel leaders' estates to that purpose. (Note: Grenada's demographics took only a few years to recalibrate, and by 1829 there were 3,786 free coloureds compared to 801 whites.) Not all the British were happy: Dyott raged against his superior officers over their handling of the last weeks of the campaign:

Oh shame to tell never did anything equal the neglect of this army in the article of provisions. After two days' severe, harassing marches, at the end of each a sharp action...there was not a drop of rum to give the men as a reward of their exertions...There was not a morsel of provisions of any kind for either officer or private man. Neglect and infamous misconduct have prevailed in this particular during the whole campaign. Blame is due somewhere, and exemplary punishment ought to attach to the person in fault." (Note: Dyott's regiment, the 25th, had suffered, he thought, more brutally from sickness than even from enemy action: it had lost, over a period of 15 months, 11 officers, 30 sergeants, 15 drummers and over 500 infantry)

Although Fedon's fate is unknown, that of his deputy, Philip, is well-attested to. He stayed in Grenada for much of the time, successfully hiding from the authorities for eight years—possibly as a "maroon" in the forest, suggested an official report—when he was discovered on Petite Martinique in March 1803 and hanged St George's market place a few days later. A similar case was that of Captain Jacques Chadeau, who evaded capture until 1808, when he was captured, hanged and gibbeted at St Eloi. (Note: Brizan suggests that Chadeau may have been the victim of a love triangle, whereby one of his lovers reported him to the authorities to spike her rival.) Candlin notes that, while those directly involved could not expect to receive mercy—and did not—those who managed to "managed to keep a low profile away from the violence and at relative peace with their neighbours fared better".

The rebellion was defined as high treason rather than merely criminal (as it would be if deemed conspiracy or sedition). Rather than the usual courts of law, those suspected of complicity on the rebellion were examined under commissions of oyer and terminer which had the power to impose arbitrary sentences and confiscate property. (Note: This particular judicial implement was also useful because it did not require witnesses to be called; the only two responses to the charge a defendant was allowed to make was either to plead guilty or to state that they were not the named individual. In Britain, by this period, although still on the statute book, it was "regarded as antiquated and morally dubious".) The confiscation of property was particularly useful, argues Murphy, as it could be distributed as patronage to loyal whites which would both increase the political authority of the anglophone community and concomitantly deprive future rebels of the financial backing that Fédon had possessed. Coloured freedmen who survived "now found themselves open to abuse on the streets, their homes invaded and their property taken", argues Candlin. The new Governor, Alexander Houstoun, reported to the Colonial Office in November 1796 that animosity from the Anglophone community towards the French and coloureds had hardly diminished. This he explained by suggesting that the most recent spate of executions had been of "Coloured people—very active dangerous characters, who had continued out in the woods, and were brought in from time to time". (Note: In the same letter to London, Houston both claimed that the island was in "perfect tranquillity" and requested to the regiments of soldiers newly sent there were allowed to stay on longer.) Approximately two-thirds of those found guilty were executed. Houston's successor, Sir Charles Green appointed in late September 1797, wrote to London that, by then

There are I understand still a few of the coloured and black Insurgents skulking in the more inaccessible parts of the Island, but of late they have done no Mischief; being afraid to shew themselves in the inhabited Quarters, and it is to be presumed cannot long exist in their present forlorn situation.

Green also refused the return to Grenada of some of the dead rebels' female relatives in 1797, on the basis that it was too dangerous to allow them back. McGrigor reports how, in the weeks following the end of the rebellion, "all the Jails were now crowded with such of the rebels as had been made prisoner", and that, in one day, "about twenty of these French proprietors were executed on a large gibbet in the market place of St. George's, leaving wives and families". Many were transported to the jungles of Central America, where they were left with deliberately insufficient provisions. Even George III, say Candlin and Pybus, "was shocked at the level of post-rebellion repression in Grenada", and the Colonial Office wrote back to Green, reprimanding him for his severity against those whose involvement was in doubt. An anonymous planter has left scholars his personal view of who was to blame for the rebellion:

"Such are the dreadful effects which have resulted from the persecution of the adopted subjects in Grenada, from the weak government of Mr Home, from the withdrawing of our usual garrison for the capture of the French islands in 1794, and the defence of them afterwards; and above all from the weak and pusillanimous conduct of the Colonial Government, from the time the President assumed the command, until the arrival of General Nicholls.

== Aftermath ==
Due to the ultimate failure of the rebellion, it impossible for scholars to know what would have happened consequently. Martin suggests that the most likely immediate result would have been—mirroring Haiti—the abolishing of slavery. However, argues Craton, while many big houses and their estates had been destroyed, Fédon and the other planter leaders of the rebellion managed to keep their own lands safe and appear to have intended a return to the plantation economy once the British had been finally evicted. Jacobs highlights that there is no documentary evidence extant that Fédon or his colleagues ever declared emancipation for the slaves of Grenada in March 1795, although notes that Dr Hay recalled Fédon offering slaves freedom if they would join the rebel army.

Goyrand, in St Lucia, put the failing of the rebellion down to the rebels' lack of unity. In a later letter to Fédon, Goyrand told him that

We had predicted, citizen, you are divided, you were overcome, thus re-join that love of the Republic to replace your ambitious desires. We want to send you forces to repair the loss that disunion has just made you.

As a result of his falling out with Fédon, Nogues left Grenada and joined Goyrand's staff in St Lucia. Martin argues that the ideological and strategic divisions within the rebel leadership fundamentally weakened it, and made it incapable of meeting the increasingly effective sorties of the British.

The white population of Grenada was radically reduced as a result of the rebellion. Candlin estimates 1,000 whites and free coloureds to have died as a result, and although the contemporary suggestion that another 1,000 whites left the island in response, an 1810 census indicates that the 633 whites listed were less than half that of 50 years earlier. There was also, notes Cox, "an even more careful and systematic screening of free coloureds entering the island". The economy too was irreparably damaged. Although some plantations survived barely damaged—particularly those of the rebel leaders—many never recovered and in some cases had to be allowed to return to the wild. The rebellion has been estimated to have caused around 26,002,214 worth of damage to Grenada, and severely, limited the island's future sugar production. Every plantation had been at least partially destroyed, and in many cases, totally. Manufacturing plants for the production of sugar cane and rum distilleries had also been put out of action, while working animals valued at 6,760,576 had been killed, and two-years' crops had perished. Production reverted to small scale, localised operations rather than the regional hub that the British had intended, refocusing on spices rather than sugar, coffee or cocoa. This compares to Grenada's pre-rebellion position as producing the British Caribbean's second-largest annual income of 46,803,986, which the rebellion wiped out. The failure of the rebellion also set back the renewal of discussion regarding French Catholics' rights for another generation. (Note: It was not until 1882 that French Catholics in Grenada attained equality with their Protestant neighbours.) Candlin summarises the after-effects of the rebellion thus:

The Royal Navy now patrolled the coastline in force. There was now no argument or protest from the French community, no truculent local councilmen or companies badgering to turn a profit, just grateful British planters and merchants at least thankful that order had been restored. The conflict had cleared the way for a widespread Anglicanization of the island and a dramatic increase in colonial power.

The rebellion was one of what Candlin and Pybus call "several interconnected struggles that tore through the Caribbean" in the Age of Revolution. It directly influenced the revolt in St Vincent in 1796, in which rebels held the country for six months before being crushed by Abercromby. (Note: Although Craton argues that the Maroon War, although much smaller than Fédon's rebellion, Has always been more famous...not just because it occurred in Jamaica, the chief of Britain's sugar colonies, but because it had the lineaments of a classic tale: a desperate cause, a heroic fight against odds, and a tragic outcome deeply discreditable to the winning side.) Although by 1797, suggests Craton "Grenada was superficially peaceful, but the effects of Fédon's rebellion were never fully mended", while Jacobs notes that the island "remained an armed camp for more than a decade afterwards".

There was as much personal as political motivations for the rebellion; the Fédons, for example, "used the conflict to try and gain more power for themselves as white rule fractured around them", and may have seen in the latest war between France and Britain a chance to secure economic and political independence for their island. while his Lieutenant, Philip, was in debt by £2,260 and had had to sell off much of his property in the years prior to the rebellion. As did much of the slave community, which often took freedom for itself without actively joining the revolt. Although the slaves who joined Fédon's army enjoyed a greater degree of freedom than they had, the vast majority of the island's slaves watched from the sidelines. Martin suggests that choosing the wrong side would mean harsh retaliation, and they chose to avoid this.

The rebellion had lasted over a year, consumed the resources of 16 British regiments,—about 10,000 men, including slaves and skilled mercenaries—and cost over £2,500,000 in sterling, argues the historian Tessa Murphy, and "paralysed one of Great Britain's most promising plantation colonies". The historian Robin Blackburn argues that Fedon's rebellion, and others in the Eastern Caribbean, "tied up more British troops and warships than the campaign in San Domingo". Both the war, and the diminishing profits that it had caused, required a large injection of cash to stimulate the Grenadian economy. Grenada may have been re-taken, argues the scholar Jessica Harland-Jacobs, but "it was clear that Britain's policies with regard to the governance of Grenada had utterly failed".

== Historiography ==
=== Sourcing ===
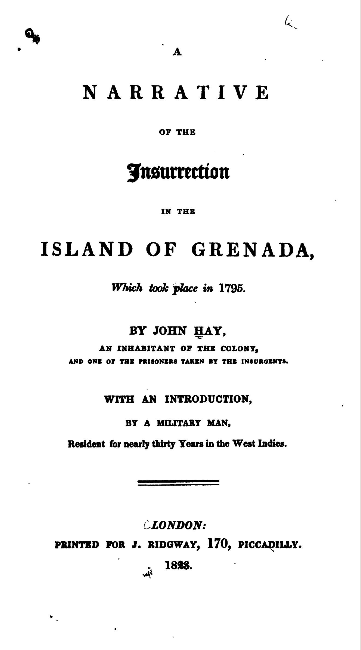
Title page of John Hay's 1823 A Narrative of the Insurrection in the Island of Grenada: Which Took Place in 1795, one of the original sources for the rebellion.

The main sources for scholars of Fédon's Rebellion are original documents, mostly held in the Registry of the Supreme Court in St George's, which contain records relating to not just Fedon but his family and antecedents. Other material is held at the National Archives in Kew, and a number of contemporary books. These are eye-witness descriptions of the rebellion but are all from the perspective of the British. As such, suggests Candlin, they "show a predictable bias to the eventual victors in the conflict", and Murphy argues that, written as they are by Protestants, they are "openly hostile". Indeed, argues Jacobs, until about 1964 all historiography on Grenada's colonial period emanates from "white, male and British" commentators. Among these accounts are those written by Dr Hay and the Parson, Francis McMahon, who had been captured at Grenville and Marquis; both published their accounts in 1823. The most important near-contemporary source is a monograph by D. G. Garraway of 1877, in which he synthesizes the contemporary recollections. The rebellion remains, says Candlin however, "of all the major slave revolts and insurrections in the Atlantic world...the least studied and the least mentioned" in the literature.

The majority of contemporary sources view it solely as the work of "French revolutionary agents, traitorous francophone residents, or free persons of African descent whose liberty threatened the colonial order", argues the scholar Caitlin Anderson. This—and the fact that they are "marked by profound silences"—makes the sources inadequate to know the fundamentals a historian wants to know: who planned it, why and what they wished to replace it with. Anderson also notes that this is at least in part due to the nature of the subsequent trials and investigations. Because courts of oyer and terminer required neither witnesses nor defence, there is nothing in writing confirming or denying either the accusations nor the responses, only lists of names, convictions and sentence. No testimonies were taken, nor, notes Jacobs, does anything remain to "shed light on the precise thoughts and feelings of the Africans, who were forcibly returned to a life of slavery after nearly two years of self-emancipated freedom". However a contemporary British slave owner touched on this question in a letter before Abercromby's final assault on Belvidere, opining that:

We are now waiting the arrival of Gen'l Abercrombie, but we are yet to know far the force of arms will succeed in laying this spirit of Insurrection. Those negroes who have tasted the charms of a life if Indolence free from controul (sic) will return with bitter reluctance to their former subjection.

The secondary scholarship, comments Candlin, has also tended towards the cursory, particularly "in comparison to the voluminous research on the closely related 1791–1804 revolution in Saint Domingue...it is often mentioned in passing but rarely discussed in detail".

=== Analysis ===
Martin argues that, while "almost all analyses of [the rebellion] define it as a slave revolt or a revolt against the slave system", the number of white French involved necessitates a far more nuanced view. The participants probably viewed the rebellion differently from the beginning, the French and free coloureds seeing themselves as anti-colonialists, while the slaves seeing as a traditional slave rebellion. Brizan, similarly, has argued that it was along the lines of a joint operation, with the French and free coloureds fighting for the ideals of the revolution while native slaves fought for their liberation. Candlin has argued that, not only was the rebellion "the deadliest slave revolt in the history of the British Caribbean", but in unleashing the power of the slaves, including their own, they [the rebel leaders] had betrayed everyone who remained loyal to the old system". The slaves were not just armed by the rebels: "all sides, royalist and republican, French and British, armed slaves in droves". Contemporaries saw the French revolutionary revolt under Fédon as preceding, but automatically leading to, a broader slave rebellion, saying, for example, how "the general insurrection of the slaves which soon followed was undoubtedly the work of the same insidious instruments employed in spreading the flame of rebellion, disseminating discord, confusion and anarchy in the minds of all who were susceptible.

The French Freemason and scholar Cécile Révauger argues that Fedon was only interested in restoring French rule, while conversely, Jacobs has called him Grenada's "first great Emancipator", although questions whether Fédon freed slaves as an emancipator himself or whether it was merely a political consequence of his allegiance to revolutionary France. Likewise, the socialist historian Chris Searle argues that, whether the rebels meant to lay particular emphasis on French revolutionary ideology, the important thing is that the British clearly thought so, blaming Jacobinism for the rebellion. Dr Hay, in his memoirs, repeatedly refers to the outbreak as a revolution rather than a rebellion, for example, and Jacobs argues that the rebels' slogan—Liberté, egalité ou la mort—was not only a battle cry: their "revolutionary aspirations, ideology, battle colours, and their mountain redoubt [became] one and the same". Tessa Murphy, on the other hand, has placed the rebellion as less a direct consequence of the French revolution, and the result of international rivalries in the Caribbean. This rivalry meant that men like Fédon and Philip, for example, "experienced an expansion—and later a violent contraction—of their possibilities for political inclusion" which drove them to rebellion. The difference, she says, is that while the revolutions that raged throughout the Caribbean at this point were concerned with gaining new droits de l'homme for all, in Grenada it was the recovery of traditional rights that inspired revolt. Men such as they, she says, "had lived in Grenada for generations, and...had long shaped the island's political economy", and wanted to regain that position. (Note: The logical result of Murphy's analysis, she notes, is that the spark for revolution is moved back from 1795—when violence broke out—but 1763, when France recognised Britain's suzerainty over Grenada.)

Murphy's argument is at odds with traditional analyses that emphasised the role and influence of the French revolution and emphasise the imported nature of much of the cause of conflict. For example, the Grenadian politician and author, George Brizan, has written that the numerous slave and black uprisings around the Caribbean on the period were "inextricably bound to events and developments within the French Revolution of 1789-96. They were by no means isolated movements but were considerably influenced by the principles of liberty, equality and fraternity as propounded by the French Revolution." Fédon's rebellion, argues Jacobs, "defies categorization", while the historian James Walvin has highlighted the particular problems that hybrid revolts such as Fédon's caused the government, arguing that "what puzzled the worried planters, however, was that the slave leaders were local-born. As long as the rebels were Africans, slave-owners had no trouble explaining revolt in terms of African barbarism. But who could explain the rebellious instinct in local-born slaves?"

Another problem the aftermath of the rebellion raised for the administration, argues Anderson, was the treatment of the slaves. While there was no compunction in meting the highest penalties of treason to them, there was an awareness that this, therefore, implied them to be British subjects—"with all the rights and privileges of that status". As such, there appears to have been an unspoken agreement not to summon any slaves before the oyer and terminer courts nor to convict them, as doing so would confer rights upon them that were incommensurate with their slave status. (Note: Anderson notes that one slave was caught and condemned for high treason in the first week of the rebellion, but also that he was the only one to be so treated.) Writing in The Encyclopedia of Africa and the Americas, C. M. Jacobs has described the revolt as "one of the most spectacular, sustained, bloody but ultimately unsuccessful antislavery, anticolonial, proto-nationalist struggles of the Age of Revolution", although the extent of the bloodshed has been contested. Craton suggests that, in fact, off the battlefield, Fédon's regime "appears (the details are sketchy) to have been far from the destructive and bloody anarchy pictured by the beleaguered whites".

==== Influence on later rebellions ====
Fédon's rebellion changed British policy towards its colonial possessions in the West Indies, which became conciliatory towards the inhabitants rather than attempting to proselytise them for the King. It was also a precursor to the slave revolts that shook the Caribbean in the next century and eventually, having made it ungovernable, the elimination of the slave trade itself. Fédon, says Jacobs—"Grenada's first anticolonial, antislavery, proto-nationalist hero"—was a direct influence on Maurice Bishop, leader of the 1979 Grenadian Revolution; Caribbean scholar Manning Marable argues that it was Bishop's "intimate knowledge" of Grenadian history that allowed him to place his revolution within the "tradition of resistance" begun by Fédon. (Note: Ironically, notes Jacobs, one of Bishop's ancestors was Louis La Grenade, a political opponent of Fédons who sided with the British during the rebellion, having become a Protestant and led the 8 April 1795 attack on Belvidere. Says Jacobs, "the evidence suggests that Bishop never publicly discussed his famous ancestor".) In a speech of November 1980, for example, Bishop referred to Grenadians as collectively being "the children of Fédon". Bishop's Minister of Health in the revolutionary government, Chris de Riggs, was also an established poet and author. His epic poem, Jookootoo I tells the story of an eternal Granadian discussing the history he has seen, including Fédon's rebellion:

Jookootoo I who walked through Belvidere wid Fedon
Was me who tell him to bun de dam place down
Grenada 1795 was naked blood and sand
and every bitch and dey brudder wid a hatchet in dey hand
Was death and terror for de Englishman
Believe yuh me dey run like hell

Martin has compared Fédon's Rebellion with that of 1979 in being equally "defining moments" in the history of the country, both "for what they set out to achieve and the impact they have had on Grenadian society ever since", and the People's Revolutionary Army's main base before the uprising was named camp Fédon. The Deputy President of the revolutionary government, Bernard Coard has since claimed that "there are links between the Fédon Revolution, the slave revolts, the ex-servicemen's revolt in 1920, the 1951 Gairy revolutionary upsurge, the 1973—74 revolutionary upsurges, and the Grenada Revolution in 1979—83". The rebellion has been seen as one of the most significant events in the region's history. The author Michael Craton, for example, has described it as "the most serious threat posed to British control anywhere in the Antilles", and it is often considered second only to the Haitian Revolution in its regional significance. Many Grenadians, suggests Martin, see Fédon as a national hero. Indeed, he reckons that those who led the revolution 200 years later saw themselves as part of a historical tradition that sprang from the rebellion. In an analysis of how social media was used by those advocating reparations for the Caribbean, the scholar Eleanora Esposito highlights how Fédon continues to represent the image of the past that politics required; in "refashioning Caribbean history as one of heroic resistance against white colonisers", Fédon was placed alongside figures such as Marcus Garvey, Sarah Basset, Nanny of the Maroons and Bussa, or what Esposito terms a "pan-Caribbean pantheon".

=== Reasons for failure ===
Brizan argues that Fedon's failure can be placed squarely on the shoulders of his inability—or unwillingness—to make a full-frontal, decisive attack on St George's: "instead of intensifying government pressure, Fédon continued demanding that the government abdicate". This allowed the British to reinforce their positions while remaining safe from attack, and eventually, isolating Fédon at Camp Liberté. Candlin emphasises that too little planning was to blame for the eventual failure of the rebellion, particularly regarding supplies and materiel. Fédon had not planned for an eventuality in which he began running out of either, and was, therefore, surprised when this occurred. Further, too much of the island's productive machinery had been destroyed in the early weeks of the uprising without a long-term plan or ability to replace it. Fédon relied on reinforcements that never materialised. As a result, notes the scholar Claudia Wright, he was unable to turn his rebellion into a revolution, "despite the duration and intensity" of it, remaining too "limited in scope" to do so. Cox, meanwhile, has argued that Fedon's inability to bring the struggle to a close ultimately worked against him, arguing that, while the original prolongation of the war had favoured him, it eventually enabled the British to re-arm and utilise external support while denying him his own. Likewise, the longer the war took, the higher the rate of attrition on Fédon's own army through injury and death.

== Memorials and cultural impact ==
The 19th-century Trinidadian novelist Edward Lanzer Joseph's Warner Arundell, published in 1838, is a historical register of the period in which Fédon is a primary protagonist, a brooding Byronic hero much favoured by Gothic literature at the time. Its characters include many other historical figures of the era, apart from Fédon, such as Ralph Woodford, Victor Hugues and Simón Bolívar. A contemporary reviewer for The Literary Gazette noted that, although "by the pen of its author, it is evidently founded on a basis of fact". The fact that Fédon's body was never recovered, writes Ward, "allow[s] Joseph to tell a different version of Grenadian history than that commonly found in the colonial archive". In Joseph's story, Fédon has survived the rebellion, and while roaming as a criminal in exile, he is haunted by a sense of failure, a "spectral mulatto". Joseph also has Fedon explain his motives for rebellion, and in a powerful speech—"in some respects anticipating Frantz Fanon"—has Fédon say:

I wished to make the negro respected despite his inky skin, to induce the mulatto to consider himself a man, although his brown complexion told him he was the son of the tyrannical white man. This archipelago once possessed a numerous and happy progeny; the white man came, and the red children of the Antilles were exterminated. Millions after millions of the dark tribes of Guinea have been brought hither by white men: where are they? They have perished, except a miserable few, who live to give birth to offspring whose inheritance is bondage, whose complexion is reproach.

Jacobs has described Fédon as "a legend and inspiration to Grenada's artists, nationalists, and revolutionaries". Craton explains Fédon's popular memorialisation as stemming from "the uncertainty of his fate, for he thereby became a permanent symbol, a mythical hero for political revolutionaries and less politically motivated freedom-loving blacks alike". Maurice Bishop's administration set up a national publishing house called Fedon Publishers, and, comments Jacobs, "it was Bishop's short-lived administration that helped to revive interest in the Fédons over the last three decades". The poet Merle Collins' Callalloo, references Fedon in the lines, "For Grannie/Fédon never existed/Toussaint/Was a/Whispered curse/Her heroes/were in Europe/Not/In the Caribbean".

The University of the West Indies runs the annual Julien Fédon Memorial Prize for historical research presented by the student body; the reference to Fedon, the University states, is intended "to increase the awareness among Grenadians and people of the region of Fedon's contribution to his homeland and the region". There is an annual Julien Fedon Lecture every year also, at which the Memorial Prize is awarded. Places named after Fédon are rare, only Mount Fédon—the mountain on which his estate was sited—being so. (Note: Jacobs also notes that "the Fédon family name, meanwhile, has completely disappeared from Grenada".)

Velvet Nelson, analysing the role of the slave trade in the modern Caribbean tourist industry, notes that the subject is rarely broached. Citing the Adventure Guide to Grenada, St. Vincent and the Grenadines—"one of the few" that does—Nelson reports that, on slavery, guides "don't delve too deeply into this side of Caribbean history...you are on vacation, and the subject is far too depressing to be read on the beach or before retiring from a lovely day in the rainforest". Fédon's rebellion, however, comments Nelson, "is one event in which the subject of slavery on Grenada is addressed". Fédon, says Nelson, exemplifies a historical individual "cast as social bandits and romanticized in literature or through tourism". (Note: Similar, says Nelson, to such figures as Ned Kelly, Robin Hood and Jesse James, each of whom polarised their contemporaries in life but were romanticised by them in death.) In Grenadian tourism, notes Nelson, while Fédon's camp is the most significant tourist attraction regarding the rebellion that bears his name, although its remote location means that most will be exposed to it second-hand rather than by making the mountain hike, suggests Nelson. Other sites of significance include the Anglican church in St George's, which holds a number of memorial tablets to hostages killed in 1796, including Ninian Home. One such reads, condemning the insurgents as having "simulated by insidious acts of French republicans/Lost all sense of duty to their sovereign". Finally, Nelson notes that Market Square is the last tourist attraction associated with the rebellion because, while it is today a bustling hub of social and economic activity, it is where the captured insurgents were hung from the public gallows in 1796.

== See also ==
- Julien Fédon
- Battle of Belvedere estate
- Louis Cazot La Grenade
- Haitian Revolt
