= Joachim Philip =

Grenadian planter and revolutionary

Joachim Philip was a Grenadian planter and revolutionary, and a member of the prominent free-coloured (mixed-race) Philip family. He was a leader of Fédon's rebellion; Philip held the rank of captain in Julien Fédon's forces and delivered Fédon's ultimatum to the British forces in St. George's. He survived the end of the rebellion but was captured in Petite Martinique eight years later and executed.

== Early life ==
Joachim Philip was the son of Jeanette, a formerly enslaved woman, and her husband Honore Philip, a French baker turned planter. Honore and Jeanette had eight children — Magdalen, Susannah, Judith, Honore, Michel, Joachim, Nicholas-Regis and Jean-Baptiste Louis. Joachim Philip and his brothers Honore and Louis trained as carpenters while his youngest brother, Nicholas-Regis was a stone mason by training.

When Honore died in 1779 he left property to his children, his two brothers, François and Jean-Pierre, and his mother. When Jeanette died in 1788 she left more property to their children across Petit Martinique, Carriacou, and the main island of Grenada. In November 1794, to settle a court judgement against him, Joachim was forced to sell his property on Petit Martinque and relocated to a family property in Gouyave.

== Fédon's rebellion ==
In 1795, less than six months after he was forced to dispose of his plantation, Joachim Philip joined Julien Fédon in his revolt against British rule. Fédon made Philip a leader in the uprising with the rank of captain. On the night of March 8, while Fédon led an attack on the town of Grenville, Philip and Etienne Ventour attacked the town of Gouyave. The town was looted and the white male population was taken prisoner by the rebels, but the only injury was a man who shot himself in the wrist with a captured pistol. This was in contrast to Grenville, where the rebels killed most of the white population.

On March 4 Philip and Charles Nogues, another free coloured planter, entered the capital, St. George's, under a flag of truce. They were escorted through the town by the militia through a hostile crowd which threatened to lynch the rebels. The militia had to restrain Philip's sister, Susannah, who otherwise would have "torn him to pieces" according to reports. Philip and Nogues informed the council that the rebels had captured the governor, Ninian Home, and delivered an ultimatum from Fédon which demanded that the British surrender the island and a proclamation from French Republican leader Victor Hugues in Guadeloupe which threatened the death of two British officers for each republican killed by the British.

When the British launched a failed attack on the rebel stronghold at Belvidere, Fédon's plantation, Philip was "in the thick of the fighting" while his brother Nicholas-Regis, who had also joined the rebels, took a lead role in the execution of the British prisoners.

== Later life ==
After the failure of the rebellion, Joachim Philip was among the 400 people named in the bill of attainder. He survived for another eight years in hiding before he was captured on Petit Martinique in 1803. He was brought to St. George's, tried, and executed by hanging in Market Square.
