= Samuel Williams (governor of Grenada) =

Governor of Grenada in the colonial era

Governor of Grenada (First term)
- In office 1787–1788
- Preceded by: William Lucas
- Succeeded by: James Campbell

Governor of Grenada (Second term)
- In office 1789–1792
- Preceded by: James Campbell
- Succeeded by: Ninian Home

Personal details
- Died: c. 1808

Samuel Williams Esq. (died c. 1808) was the acting governor of Grenada twice, firstly from 9 October 1787 to 1788 and then again from 1789 to 28 January 1792.

== Governorships ==
Prior to becoming governor Williams had served as Secretary of State. Samuel Williams became governor of Grenada on 9 October 1787 after the premature death of acting governor William Lucas. During Williams’ tenure Fort Frederick and a barracks were being prepared by the Black Artificers and labourers for a detachment of the 45th Regiment. He was succeeded in his first tenure by James Campbell and he was succeeded by Ninian Home after his second tenure.
