= Julien Fédon =

Leader of slave revolt in Grenada

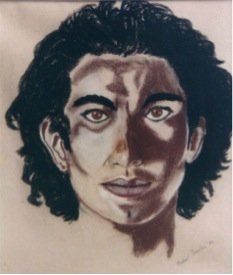
- Portrait of Julien Fédon
- Born: Unknown but likely 1750s Martinique
- Disappeared: June 1796
- Died: Unknown, possibly June 1796 (possibly died in a canoe at sea)
- Occupations: Landowner and lead commander of the slave revolt in Grenada
- Known for: Fédon’s Rebellion
- Spouse: Marie Rose Cavelan
- Children: Daughters (unspecified amount)

Julien Fédon (died c. 1796), also called Julien Fedon, Foedonn, Feydn, and Fidon, was the leader of the Fédon Rebellion, a revolt against British rule led primarily by free mixed-race French-speakers that took place in Grenada between 2 March 1795 and 19 June 1796.

The Fédon Rebellion broke out in the same year as several other rebellions in the Caribbean, including in Cuba, Jamaica, and Coro, Venezuela. During the 19th and 20th centuries, Fédon was considered a folk hero in Grenada and influenced the nationalist leaders and revolutionaries of the island.

== Biography ==
Julien Fédon was born on the island of Martinique. He was the son of Pierre Fédon, a French jeweler who had migrated to Martinique from Bordeaux, France, in 1749. His mother was a freed black. The family moved to Grenada in the 1750s, when the island was under French rule. However, according to a historian, Edward Cox, Fédon seems not to have lived there until 1772 and probably migrated to it later.

In Grenada, Fédon married Marie Rose Cavelan, a mixed-race woman, in 1787, and they settled on a plantation in Saint John Parish known as the Belvedere Estate Grenada. Fédon was appointed commanding general of the French republican forces on Guadeloupe.

Fédon began his revolt in Grenada on the night of 2 March 1795. With the help of around 100 freed slaves and people of mixed heritage, Fédon fought against the island's French and British planters. The rebels' attacks were coordinated against the cities of Grenville and Gouyave. Grenville had been a scene of brutality, a "massacre of the English white inhabitants." The rebels looted and burned houses and murdered many British planters. They shed less blood in Gouyave, instead capturing several of the white English population. Ninian Home, the former governor, was one of those captured. Home had left St. George's to visit his estates in the parish of St. John. After returning to the mountains of Belvedere, the rebels joined a large group of slaves who had fled the plantations where they worked. In the mountains, Fédon built several fortifications to withstand British attacks.

During the rebellion, about 14,000 of the 28,000 slaves on Grenada at the time were allied to the revolutionary forces; some 7,000 of them were killed in action. At the time of the rebellion, Grenada still had a significant francophone population. Many French people who had seen Grenada ceded to the British in 1763 joined as well, along with some French Catholics who had been excluded from civil and political rights because of their religion and wanted to oust the British. The French had limited rights, particularly those considered mixed-race.

On 8 April 1795 a brother of Fédon died in the skirmish called the battle of Belvedere. To avenge the death of his brother, Fédon ordered the summary execution of 48 of the 53 British prisoners he was holding on the mountain, he also executed these prisoners because the British had attacked his camp, and Fédon had made the threat that if anymore attacks were to happen in his base he would summarily execute the hostages, these executed hostages included Governor Ninian Home.

From their base in the mountains, Fédon's rebels were able to control the whole island except for St. George Parish, the seat of government. Their attack on St. George failed, and historians consider this the source of the rebellion's eventual defeat. Also, on many occasions, Fédon allowed the British to regroup and gain strength without launching an attack.

The day after the failed attack on St. George, the forces of Fédon were defeated on the steep hills and ridges near Mt. Qua Qua. The few surviving rebels flung themselves down the mountain. Fédon was never captured, and his whereabouts after the revolt are unknown. Some historians believe he tried to flee the island by canoe, which may have sunk in poor weather. Whilst others say that he escaped to Trinidad or Cuba, and there were claimed sightings of him as late as 1815.

== Ideology ==
Fédon was influenced by the French Revolution, the French revolutionary leaders on Guadeloupe, and the Haitian Revolution. Some historians have claimed Fédon intended to grant freedom to the island's slaves, while others claim he merely wanted the island to return to Catholic French control. His followers (notably Jean-Pierre La Valette, Charles Nogues, Stanislaus Besson, Etienne Ventour, and Joachim Phillip) were also influenced by the French Revolution's ideals of liberty, equality, and fraternity.

== Legacy ==
The mountain that was the rebels' base during the revolt, located on Fédon's Belvedere Estate in the center of Grenada, is the only place on the island that bears his name. The mountain, whose original name was Morne Vauclain, is now called Morne Fédon. However, the surname Fédon has disappeared from Grenada.
