= Ninian Home =

British colonial administrator and planter (1732–1795)

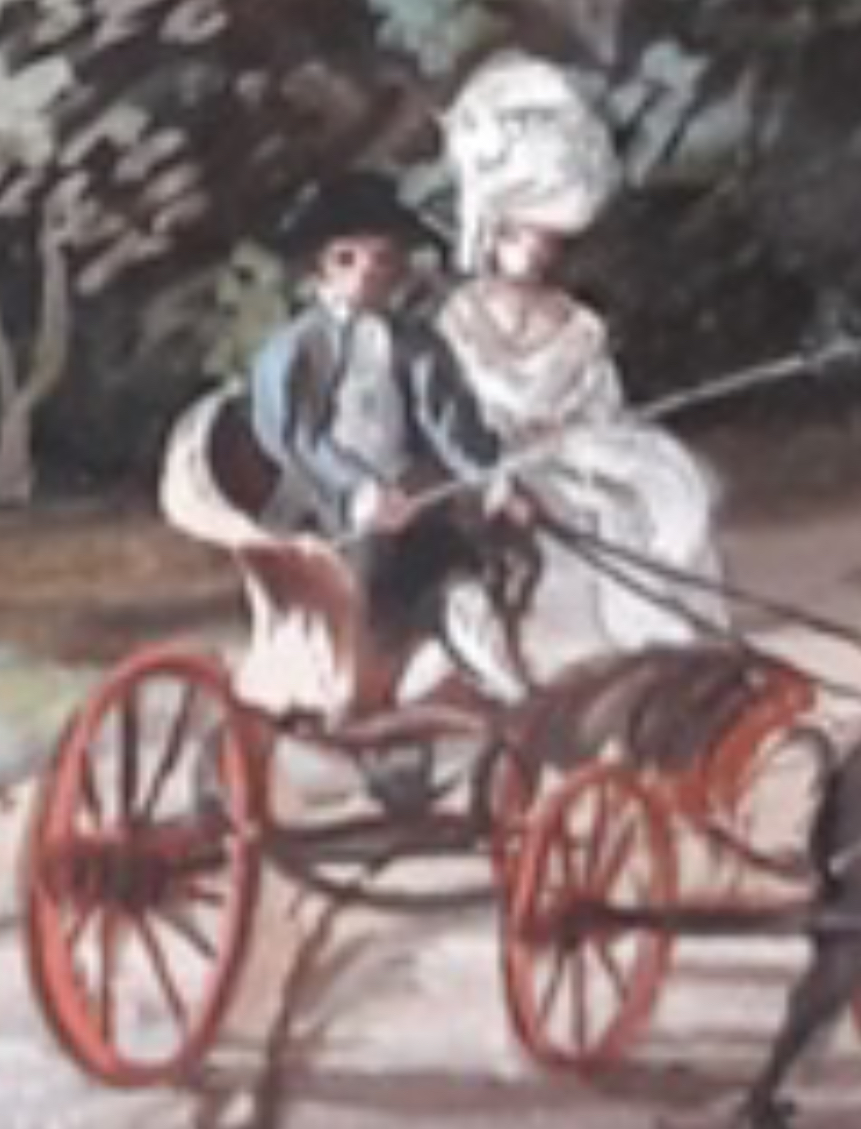
- Ninian Home and his wife Penelope as depicted in a 1789 painting of Paraclete estate (or Waltham Estate)

Governor of Grenada
- In office 17 November 1792–1795
- Preceded by: Samuel Williams (acting)
- Succeeded by: Kenneth Francis Mackenzie

Personal details
- Born: 1732 Scotland
- Died: Abt. 6 April 1795 Belvedere estate, Grenada
- Citizenship: British
- Spouse: Penelope (died 1794)
- Parents: Alexander Home, of Jardinefield (father); Isabel Home (mother)
- Relatives: Patrick Home (uncle)
- Occupation: Landowner and governor of Grenada

Ninian Home (1732 – c. 6 April 1795) was a British colonial administrator and planter who served as the governor of Grenada during Fédon's rebellion, a revolt against British rule led primarily by free mixed-race French-speakers that took place between 2 March 1795, and 19 June 1796. Home was captured and held hostage during the rebellion and was eventually executed (“murdered” was the term used by the British).

== Biography ==
Ninian Home was born in 1732 in Scotland and made his fortune from his plantations in Grenada which enabled him to purchase Paxton House, Berwickshire from his uncle, Patrick Home, in 1773.

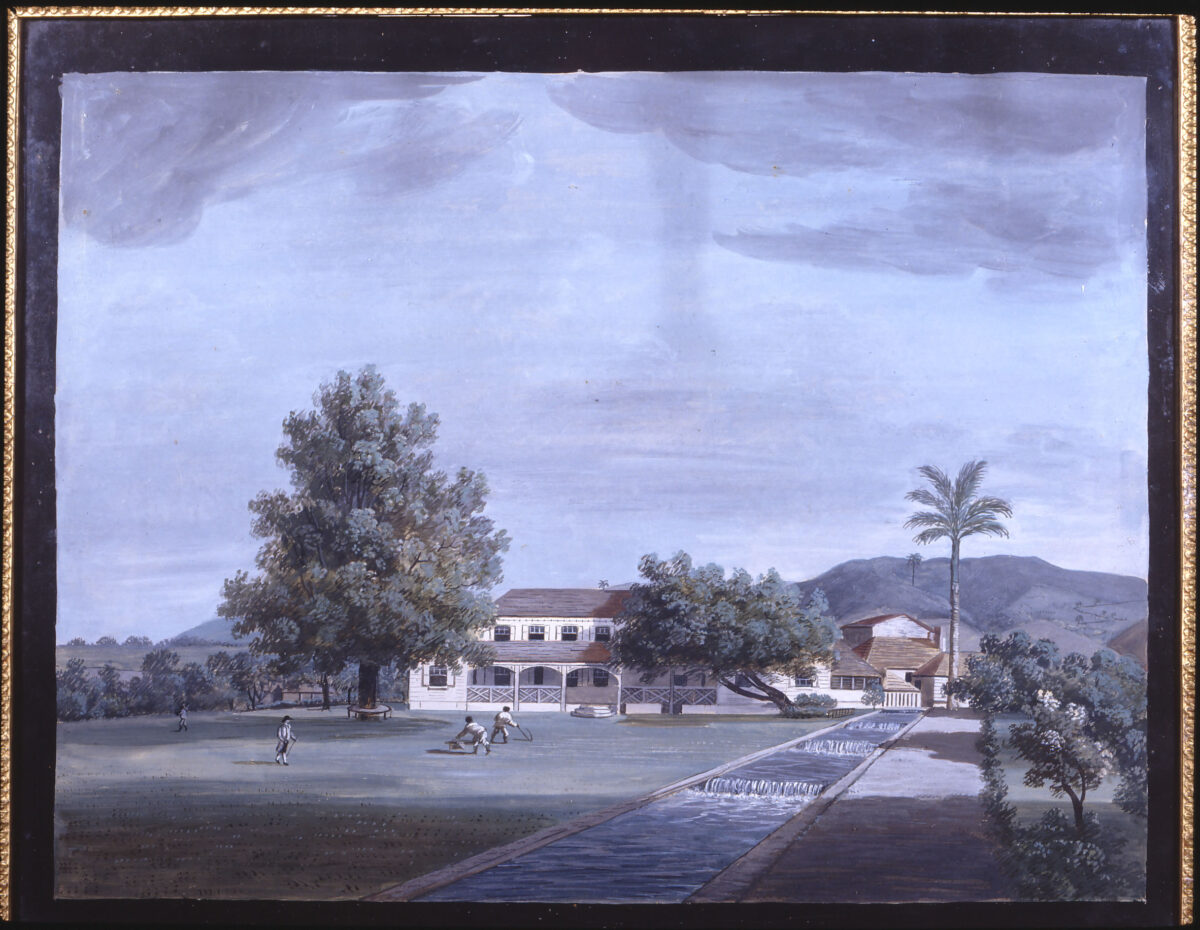
Paraclete Estate painted by Adam Callander (1789), Ninian Home is depicted in the very corner overseeing some Slaves

Home was sent to Virginia as a young man to earn his living. He first went to Grenada in 1756, where he would later spend most of his career. From 1764 Home spent much of his time in Grenada where he owned two plantations (after taking about an immense mortgage on the plots) which were manned by over 400 enslaved people growing coffee, cocoa and sugar. He owned the Waltham Estate in the parish of St Mark from 1780 as well as Paraclete in the parish of St Andrew. He also owned land on the island of Mustique in Saint Vincent and the Grenadines. He also part-owned a number of trading vessels in the Caribbean which transported goods and slaves. In 1789, a variety of paintings were created depicting Paraclete estate (one may be of Waltham estate) many of them containing small figures of slaves and of Ninian Home, these are the only depictions of him from the time. These paintings are now all located at Paxton House.

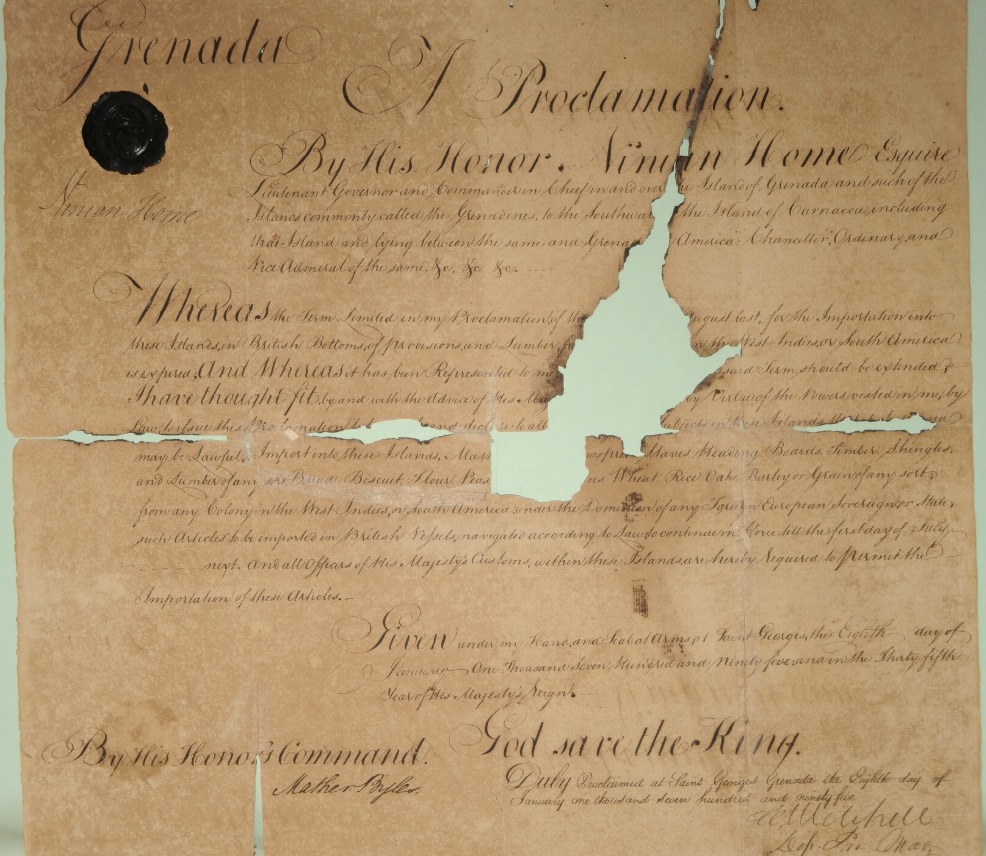
Proclamation of Ninian Home, 9 January 1795 ordering the disarming of immigrants on arrival.

Ninian Home became Governor of Grenada in 1793.

On 3 March 1795, the second day of the revolt led by Julien Fédon, Governor Home was captured along with around 50/51 others and held hostage. Most of the hostages (48 out of the 51) including Ninian Home, were executed by the rebels after a failed attack on their camp by the British, called the Battle of Belvedere estate. The hostages had been placed in a makeshift prison, before being placed in stocks inside the prison. During the attack on Belvedere the prisoners were returned to the makeshift prison whilst the battle ensued. John Hay (one of the only surviving hostages) noted that he heard someone shout in French “The prisoners are to be shot!”, as the guards readied their muskets. The prisoners were let out and Hay begged for mercy, however Fédon did not agree and continued the executions. Fédon gave the order to fire himself, staring on at the executions along with his wife and daughters. Some of the prisoners were not quite dead after being shot, and so Fédon ordered the “Saloperie” (the “dirty bastards”) to be finished off using bayonets and cutlass, which the soldiers carried out.

Ninian's brother, George Home of Wedderburn, succeeded to his Scottish and Grenadian estates upon his death.
