= 103rd =

103rd is the ordinal form of the number 103. 103rd or One hundred and third may also refer to:

- A fraction, 1/103, equal to one of 103 equal parts

== Geography ==
- 103rd meridian east, a line of longitude
- 103rd meridian west, a line of longitude
- 103rd Street (disambiguation)

== Military ==
- 103rd Brigade (disambiguation)
- 103rd Division (disambiguation)
- 103rd Regiment (disambiguation)

== See also ==
- April 13, 103rd day of the year in a standard year
