= 103rd Division =

103rd Division or 103rd Infantry Division may refer to:

- 103rd Division (1st Formation) (People's Republic of China), 1948–1951
- 103rd Division (2nd Formation) (People's Republic of China), 1951–1952
- 103rd Commando Division, People's Democratic Republic of Ethiopia
- 103rd Infantry Division (German Empire)
- 103rd Infantry Division "Piacenza", Italian Army, World War II
- 103rd Division (Imperial Japanese Army)
- 103rd Guards Rifle Division, Soviet Union, later the 103rd Guards Airborne Division
- 103rd Rifle Division, Soviet Union
- 103rd Infantry Division (United States)

== See also ==
- List of military divisions by number
- 103rd Brigade (disambiguation)
- 103rd Regiment (disambiguation)
- 103rd (disambiguation)
