= Robert Bruce, Lord Kennet =

Scottish advocate, legal scholar and judge

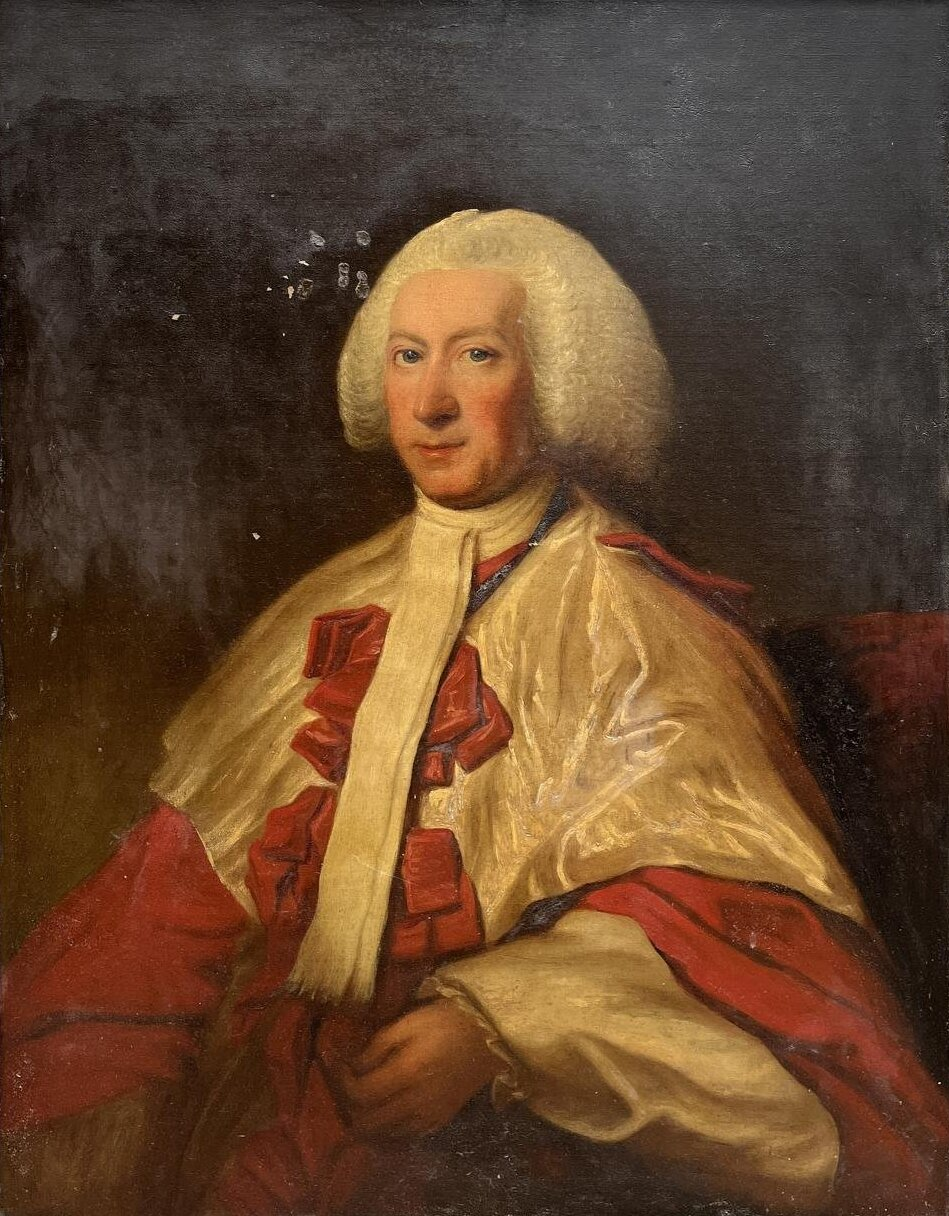
Portrait by David Martin, 1782

Robert Bruce of Kennet, Lord Kennet FRSE (24 December 1718 – 8 April 1785) was a Scottish advocate, legal scholar and judge.

== Life ==
Bruce was born in Edinburgh on 28 December 1718, the son of Mary Balfour, daughter of Robert Balfour, 4th Lord Burleigh and Alexander Bruce of Kennet (1691-1747).

He was admitted to the Faculty of Advocates in January 1743. He served as Professor of Law of Nature and Nations at the University of Edinburgh (1758–64) and was appointed Sheriff-Depute of Stirling & Clackmannan in 1760. He was elected a Senator of the College of Justice, as Lord Kennet, in 1764 and Lord of Justiciary in 1769.

In 1783 he was a founder member of the Royal Society of Edinburgh. His Edinburgh address at this time was at George Square.

He died at Kennet House on 8 April 1785, aged 66.

== Family ==
He married Helen Abercromby (b. 1731) on 6 June 1754.

They had seven sons and one daughter, including his heir, Alexander (1755-1808) who was born in Edinburgh. The remaining six children were born between 1757 and 1771 at Kennet House.

Bruce was the uncle of James Abercromby, 1st Baron Dunfermline (1776-1858). His brothers-in-law included James Stuart-Mackenzie (1719–1800), Alexander Abercromby, Lord Abercromby (1745–1795), James Edmonstone (d.1793) and Sir Lawrence Dundas, 1st Baronet (1712-1781) who had married his older sister Margaret (b. 1716).
