= 103rd Regiment of Foot =

Five regiments of the British Army have been numbered the 103rd Regiment of Foot:

- 103rd Regiment of Foot (Volunteer Hunters), raised in 1760
- 103rd Regiment of Foot (King's Irish Infantry), raised in 1782
- 103rd Regiment of Foot (1794), raised in 1794
- 103rd Regiment of Foot (1806), formed from garrison units in 1808
- 103rd Regiment of Foot (Royal Bombay Fusiliers), raised by the East India Company and placed on the British establishment as the 103rd Foot in 1862
