= Alexander Abercromby, Lord Abercromby =

Scottish advocate, judge and essayist (1745–1795)

Lord Abercromby, mezzotint by George Dawe, after a lost portrait by Henry Raeburn

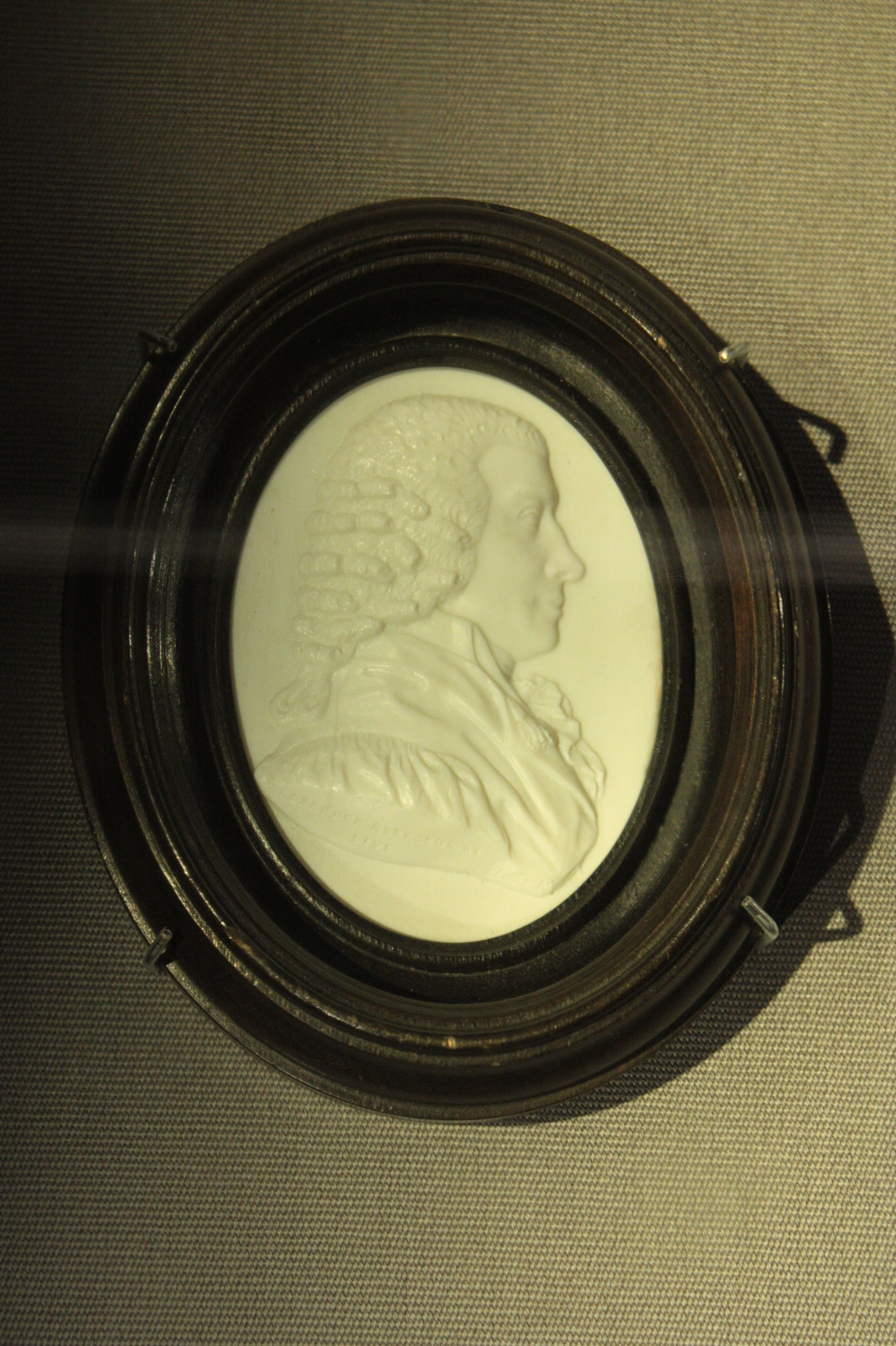
Cameo of Lord Alexander Abercromby, 1791, Scottish National Portrait Gallery

Alexander Abercromby, Lord Abercromby of Tullibody FRSE (15 October 1745 – 17 November 1795) was a Scottish advocate, judge and essayist.

== Life ==
Abercromby was born in Tullibody House in Clackmannanshire on 15 October 1745, the fourth and youngest son of George Abercromby of Tullibody (1705-1800) and Mary Dundas. Two of his brothers entered the army; one of them became general Sir Ralph Abercromby. Alexander was the brother-in-law of Robert Bruce, Lord Kennet and James Edmonstone.

Alexander studied law at the University of Edinburgh, where he seems to have been chiefly distinguished for his handsome person and engaging disposition. He was admitted a member of the Faculty of Advocates in 1766, and was soon afterwards (1770) appointed sheriff-depute of Clackmannanshire.

However, personal residence was not required within the county served, and he continued the practice of his profession at the bar in Edinburgh. In 1780 he resigned his sheriffship and was appointed one of the advocates-depute by Henry Dundas, then Lord Advocate of Scotland, and acquired a good practice. He also helped Henry Mackenzie, the author of the Man of Feeling, to start the Mirror, published at Edinburgh in 1779, and contributed to the Lounger in 1785 and 1786.

In 1783 he was one of the original founders of the Royal Society of Edinburgh.

Abercromby's papers show much correctness of style and tenderness of expression. In 1792 he took his seat on the bench of the Court of Session under the judicial title of Lord Abercromby, and a few months afterwards was appointed one of the lords commissioners of justiciary.

In Edinburgh his offices were at Parliament Square and his house was at Horse Wynd.

== Publications ==
Lord Abercromby's known contributions to literature consist of ten magazine articles in the Mirror and nine in the Lounger.

== Death ==
On 17 November 1795, he died of pulmonary disease at Exmouth.
