= HMS Abercrombie =

Three ships of the Royal Navy have borne the name HMS Abercrombie, after General Sir Ralph Abercromby, but using the variant spelling of his name:

- HMS Abercrombie (1809) was a 74-gun third rate, previously the French D'Hautpoul. She was captured in 1809 and sold in 1817.
- HMS Abercrombie (1915) was an Abercrombie-class monitor. She was originally planned as Farragut, then renamed Admiral Farragut, M1 and General Abercrombie, before being renamed HMS Abercrombie before her launch in 1915. She was sold in 1927.
- HMS Abercrombie (F109) was a Roberts-class monitor launched in 1942 and scrapped in 1954.
