= 103rd Division (2nd Formation) (People's Republic of China) =

103rd Division (1951-52)
- Active: 1951.2 - 1952.6
- Country: People's Republic of China
- Branch: People's Liberation Army
- Type: Division
- Role: Infantry
- Garrison/HQ: Wenzhou, Zhejiang

The 103rd Division(Chinese: 第103师)(2nd Formation) was activated on February 26, 1951 from 5th Military Sub-district and elements from the former 103rd Division. The division was composed of:

- 307th Infantry Regiment (former 5th Security Regiment of Zhejiang Military District);
- 308th Infantry Regiment (expanded from 2nd Battalion, 309th Infantry Regiment of former 103rd Division);
- 309th Infantry Regiment (1st and 3rd Battalion, Security Regiment of Zhejiang Military Region).

The division was acting as Wenzhou Military Sub-district.

In June 1952 the division was disbanded along with its 308th Infantry Regiment. Its 307th Infantry Regiment was transferred to Wenzhou Military Sub-district, while 309th Infantry Regiment was transferred to Taizhou Military Sub-district's control.
