= William Dyott =

British Army officer and courtier

General William Dyott DL JP
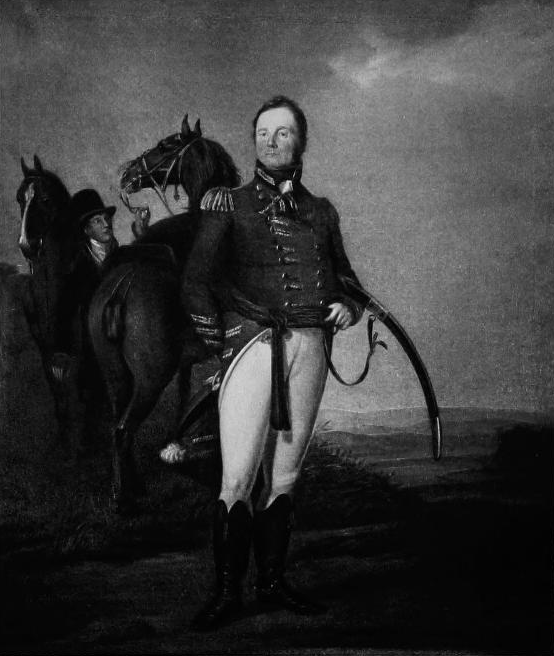
- Portrait of Dyott published in the edited volumes of his diaries
- Born: 17 April 1761
- Died: 7 May 1847 (aged 87); Freeford Hall, Staffordshire
- Burial place: St Mary's Church, Lichfield
- Education: Queen Elizabeth's Grammar School, Ashbourne; Nottingham High School
- Spouse: Eleanor Thompson (m. 1806; div. 1815)
- Military career
- Allegiance: Great Britain; United Kingdom
- Branch: British Army
- Service years: 1781–1847
- Rank: General
- Unit: 4th Regiment of Foot
- Commands: 103rd Regiment of Foot; 25th Regiment of Foot
- Conflicts: American War of Independence; French Revolutionary Wars; West Indies Campaign (1793–1798); Fédon's rebellion; French invasion of Egypt and Syria; Siege of Alexandria (1801); Napoleonic Wars; Walcheren Campaign

General William Dyott DL JP (17 April 1761 – 7 May 1847) was a British Army officer and courtier who served in the American War of Independence and French Revolutionary and Napoleonic Wars. Having joined the 4th Regiment of Foot in 1781, he initially served in Ireland before moving to Nova Scotia where in 1788 he befriended Prince William Henry, the future William IV. Dyott undertook a series of staff appointments in England and Ireland until after the start of the French Revolutionary Wars when, promoted to lieutenant colonel, he took the 25th Regiment of Foot to the West Indies. In 1796 Dyott fought against Fédon's rebellion on Grenada, returning at the end of the year having lost the majority of his regiment to yellow fever.

After several more staff appointments Dyott took the 25th to serve in the liberation of French-occupied Egypt in 1801, arriving too late to participate in most of the campaign but seeing action at the siege of Alexandria. In the first years of the ensuing Napoleonic Wars Dyott worked as a staff officer in Ireland, and also served George III as an aide de camp. Promoted to major-general in 1809 Dyott was ordered to take command of a brigade in the Peninsular War, but his appointment was cancelled when the army was evacuated after the Battle of Corunna. Later in the year Dyott was appointed to a different brigade for the Walcheren Campaign. Quickly beset by fevers, the campaign stagnated. Dyott formed part of the garrison on Walcheren before his return to England in October.

Dyott declined to serve in the new Peninsular Army under Lord Wellington in 1810 and saw no further active service. He held staff appointments in England until his promotion to lieutenant-general in 1813. In retirement Dyott served as a deputy lieutenant and justice of the peace for Staffordshire and was active in politics as a Tory. From 1781 to 1845 Dyott had written a diary, and in 1907 these were published in two edited volumes. Lord Ponsonby describes him as "an honest, unreflecting, and unobservant man".

== Early life ==
William Dyott was born on 17 April 1761, the second son of Richard Dyott of Freeford Hall and his wife Katherine née Herrick. Dyott's paternal family had lived near Lichfield since the reign of Elizabeth I, and several of his ancestors served as Member of Parliament for Lichfield. Dyott was educated at Clifford's School in Lichfield from the age of 5, later moving to Price's School when he around 8 before going on to Queen Elizabeth's Grammar School, Ashbourne at the age of 12. Dyott disliked this latter school, describing it in his diary as "such a school as fitted youth for no pursuit in life beyond a retail shop-board", and moved to Nottingham High School in 1775 where he spent the last four years of his education.

Dyott then spent several years in idle leisure, mostly staying with his friend Nigel Gresley at Drakelow Hall. In 1781 Dyott joined the British Army. With the support of Henry Paget, Baron Paget, Dyott spoke to General Jeffery Amhurst, Baron Amherst, who on 20 February enrolled him in Lewis Lochée's private military academy in London. Dyott spent four months at the academy, during which he struck up a life-long friendship with the future General John Hodgson.

== Military service ==
=== Early years ===
Dyott joined the British Army as an ensign in the 4th Regiment of Foot on 14 March 1781. The regiment was based in Ireland, and Dyott joined it at Armagh in August. His first military duties were mostly attending reviews and punishing deserters. He was subsequently promoted to lieutenant on 9 May 1782, serving in this period at Galway, Limerick, Cork, and Enniskillen. He was then placed on half pay towards the end of 1783, the American War of Independence having ended. He spent this subsequent period between Freeford, Bath, and London. Dyott returned to active service on 26 December 1784 and re-joined the 4th at Dublin, being appointed the regiment's adjutant on 3 April 1785.

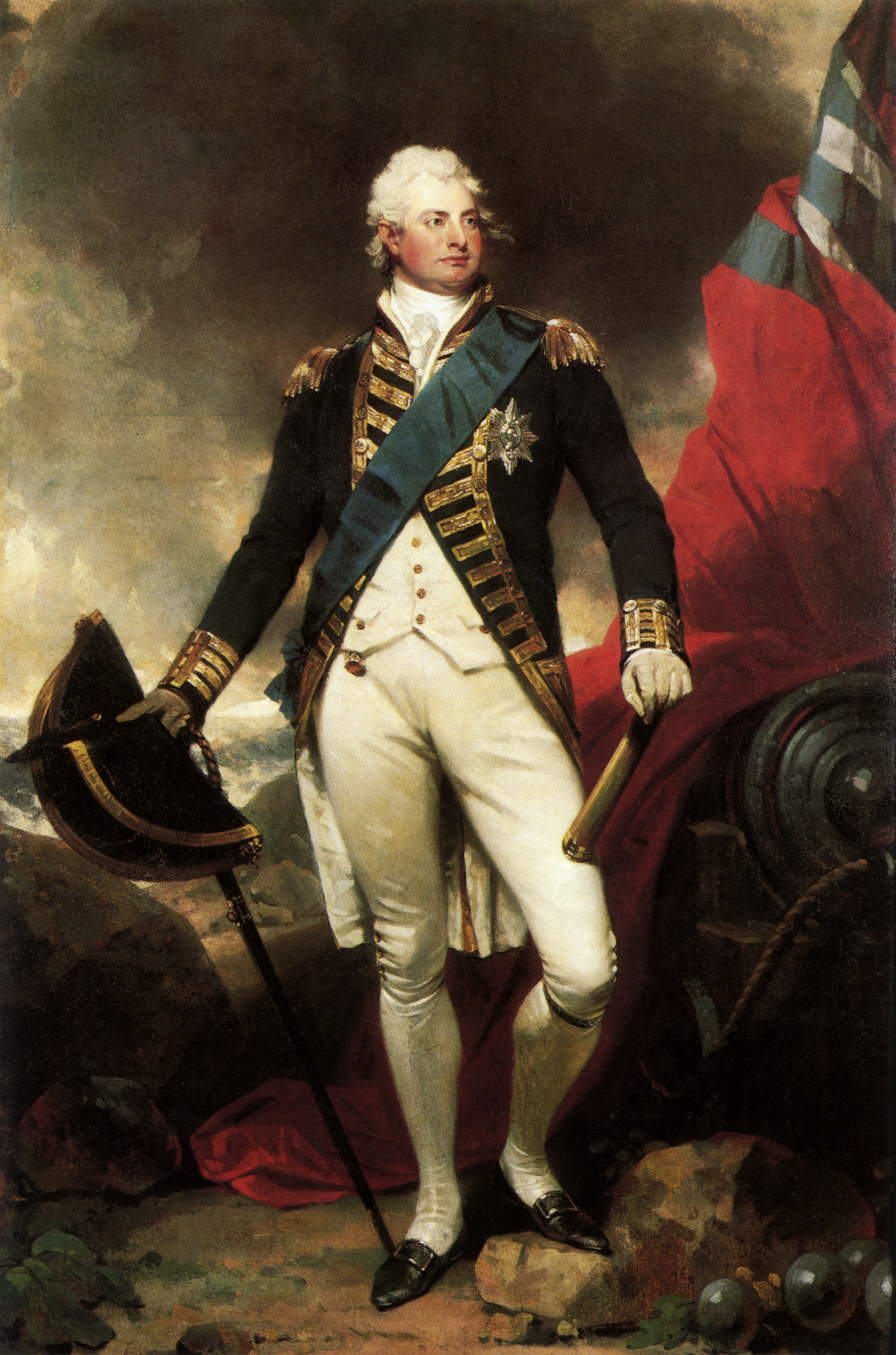
Prince William Henry, then Duke of Clarence and St Andrews. Portrait of the Duke of Clarence by Martin Archer Shee, 1800

Towards the beginning of 1787 Dyott spent several months on leave as his father's health was worsening, with the elder Dyott dying on 2 January. In May the 4th was sent to serve in Nova Scotia, arriving there in July. Dyott met Captain Prince William Henry, who commanded the frigate HMS Andromeda, at Halifax in around July 1788. A life-long friendship formed between Dyott and the prince, with the two regularly drinking together and playing pranks on each other. Dyott spent the following two years stationed at Port Edward.

Dyott went on leave in December 1792 and returned to England to visit his family, arriving on 28 December. Around this time the British Army began to expand in preparation for the French Revolutionary Wars, and Dyott was employed with a recruiting party for the 4th at Lichfield. He was promoted to captain on 25 April 1793 and given command of a company in the 4th. Around this time he also took charge of the training of the Staffordshire Militia before it moved to serve at Plymouth, where Dyott joined it and for a while wore its uniform. In June Dyott was appointed brigade major to Major-General George Hotham, who commanded the Plymouth Military District.

On 19 May 1794 Dyott purchased his promotion to major, for the purpose of which he assisted in forming and then joined the 103rd Regiment of Foot at Devizes. The regiment travelled to Bristol in October, from where it sailed to Dublin and subsequently served at Clonmel. Dyott was promoted to lieutenant colonel on 18 February 1795. He was then appointed brigade major to General Lord George Lennox, the Governor of Plymouth, in May. Dyott lived with Lennox's family while serving at Plymouth.

In September the men of Dyott's regiment were transferred into other units and the 103rd was disbanded. Dyott then exchanged his commission into the 28th Regiment of Foot which was embarked at Portsmouth for service in the West Indies campaign. He relinquished his position with Lennox and joined the 28th there. One of the other regiments waiting there was the 25th Regiment of Foot, of which Lennox was colonel, and Dyott transferred to command it instead on 11 November.

=== French Revolutionary Wars ===
==== Fédon's rebellion ====
Having left Portsmouth the ships were initially caught up in Christian's storm and driven back. The fleet departed again on 9 December and between 14–24 December the ships were again dispersed by heavy gales. Dyott's ship continued the journey alone and reached Barbados on 11 February 1796, the first ship of the fleet to do so. From there the 25th was sent as reinforcements to Grenada on 1 March, where the battle against the insurgent Fédon's rebellion was ongoing. They arrived on 3 March. 100 men of the 25th, including Dyott, then joined the expeditionary force leaving St. George's to dislodge rebels from several strategic points that the British had recently abandoned. They left in the evening of 22 March and spent ten hours marching 8 miles (13 km) through the night. At 2 p.m. the following day they encountered some of the rebels. Dyott, who commanded the 25th and 200 men of the 9th Regiment of Foot, supported the attack of the Loyal Black Rangers that captured the position with minimal casualties. The force next planned to attack the strongpoint named Post Royal, but delayed the attack because the troops were heavily fatigued. Dyott wrote that "if we had been attacked I should have been cut to pieces, as it was impossible I could move".

The British began to bombard Post Royal on 25 March, with the 25th garrisoning the rebel position captured earlier. Dyott did not participate in the assault later that day, but was unimpressed with the unorganised way in which the position was eventually taken. During the night of 26 March the rebels abandoned their other position, Pilot Hill, in the knowledge that the British were going to storm it. In the following day the 25th were positioned on a ridge in front of Post Royal, with Pilot Hill having been occupied. Dyott's position turned out to be very unhealthy for his troops, and in the following couple of months upwards of 300 men were lost while the force waited for reinforcements. By June these had arrived, and on 9 June the Post Royal troops marched out to rebellion leader Julien Fédon's main camp at Belvidere. The journey took them twenty-one hours, during which they skirmished with rebels in a route that, according to Dyott, "was literally up and down precipices, half-way up the leg in clay, and through a wood where I believe no human foot had ever before stepped".

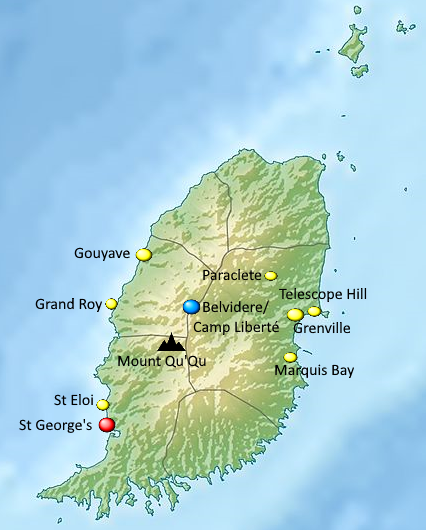
Map showing some of the key locations on Grenada during Fédon's rebellion

Dyott was ordered to capture Mount St. John, the neighbouring hill to Mount Quaqua where Fédon's camp was, on 11 June. The rebels retreated to Quaqua as his force approached, and he set up camp on top of St. John. On the following day two deserters from Fédon told Dyott that morale was collapsing in the camp, and on 13 June Fédon proposed surrender if his officers could go to Guadeloupe. This was refused. The British then continued to wait around Quaqua, to Dyott's displeasure as his men began to be affected by sickness again. Dyott was then given command of an ad-hoc brigade, containing the 25th, 9th, and 8th Regiment of Foot, that was to form part of a flanking manoeuvre around Fédon's position. They planned to attack on 17 June but a lack of provisions forced them to abandon the attempt. One day's food and drink was subsequently supplied, and Dyott remonstrated with his commander Brigadier-General Alistair Campbell that they had to move quickly before the force was further diminished by sickness. They moved out in the early morning of 18 June and at 5 p.m. reached the first rebel outpost, which was captured as night fell.

Campbell and Dyott camped at the position overnight, during which part of the main force crawled close to Fédon's camp and surrounded the rebels. Upon realising their predicament at dawn Fédon and his men escaped by throwing themselves down the steep mountainsides, allowing the British to occupy Quaqua without a shot being fired; around 100 rebels were killed. Dyott's force left its camp in the early morning and advanced on another rebel outpost while being sniped at from the bush. This was captured by the force's light companies at 9 a.m., losing several men to Fédon's guerilla tactics. The final rebel outpost was captured by other troops at around noon, leaving Dyott's force to relax in several huts. He was again disappointed with the organisation of the operation, with little having been done to supply the men for more than the day of the attack.

With the majority of Fédon's force defeated there was little for the British to do, and most were withdrawn from the island. The 25th were left on Grenada, and Dyott learned to his disappointment that the regiment was to stay in the West Indies rather than return to Europe. Illness continued to be a problem for the regiment, and within four days of the final capture Dyott sent forty men to hospital. On 24 June Dyott was ordered back to St George's where yellow fever was rife. With his regiment having lost through sickness over 500 men, the remaining rank and file of the 25th were drafted into the 53rd Regiment of Foot. The surviving officers and sergeants were to return to England. They boarded ship on 12 July. Dyott himself underwent an attack of yellow fever as the ships reached Tortola, and after arriving at Plymouth on 20 September he was allowed to go ashore immediately.

==== Egypt campaign ====
Dyott spent some time on leave before returning to his regiment, still at Plymouth, in 1797. In June the following year Dyott was put on notice to travel to Ireland with the Lancashire Militia to suppress the Irish Rebellion of 1798, but it was fully defeated before he could leave England. Dyott and the 25th were moved to Jersey in August. In March 1799 Dyott was appointed assistant adjutant general to the South-West District, under General Sir William Pitt. He volunteered in June to return to his regiment to serve with it in the Anglo-Russian invasion of Holland, but did not eventually do so. He instead travelled with Pitt to wait upon George III at Weymouth in August. When Pitt was replaced by Lieutenant-General Edmund Stevens in September, Dyott moved to his new headquarters at Salisbury. He was promoted to brevet colonel on 1 January 1800 and relinquished his post, returning to command of the 25th now at Ipswich. The regiment was favourably inspected by George III at Bagshot Heath on 12 June, leaving for Lewes on 2 September.

Dyott was appointed an aide de camp to George III, probably as a result of the Bagshot Heath inspection, in May 1801; he and his regiment were then ordered to go to Weymouth to attend the king, but other orders intervened. The 25th was one of two regiments in England that had recruited men with the agreement that they would be willing to serve outside of Europe. As such, in March, it had been ordered to reinforce the ongoing British campaign in Egypt to liberate it from French occupation. They embarked at Portsmouth on 28 May and reached Egypt on 9 July, missing the decisive siege of Cairo for which the reinforcements had been asked. On 9 August Dyott's regiment was placed in Major-General George Ludlow's 1st Brigade as part of the reorganisation of the army in preparation for the siege of Alexandria. Alexandria was heavily defended by the French and while a regular siege would be taking place to the east of the city, Ludlow's brigade and two others, under Major-General Eyre Coote, were to be shipped up the lake on the west side of the city to open a second front against the defenders.

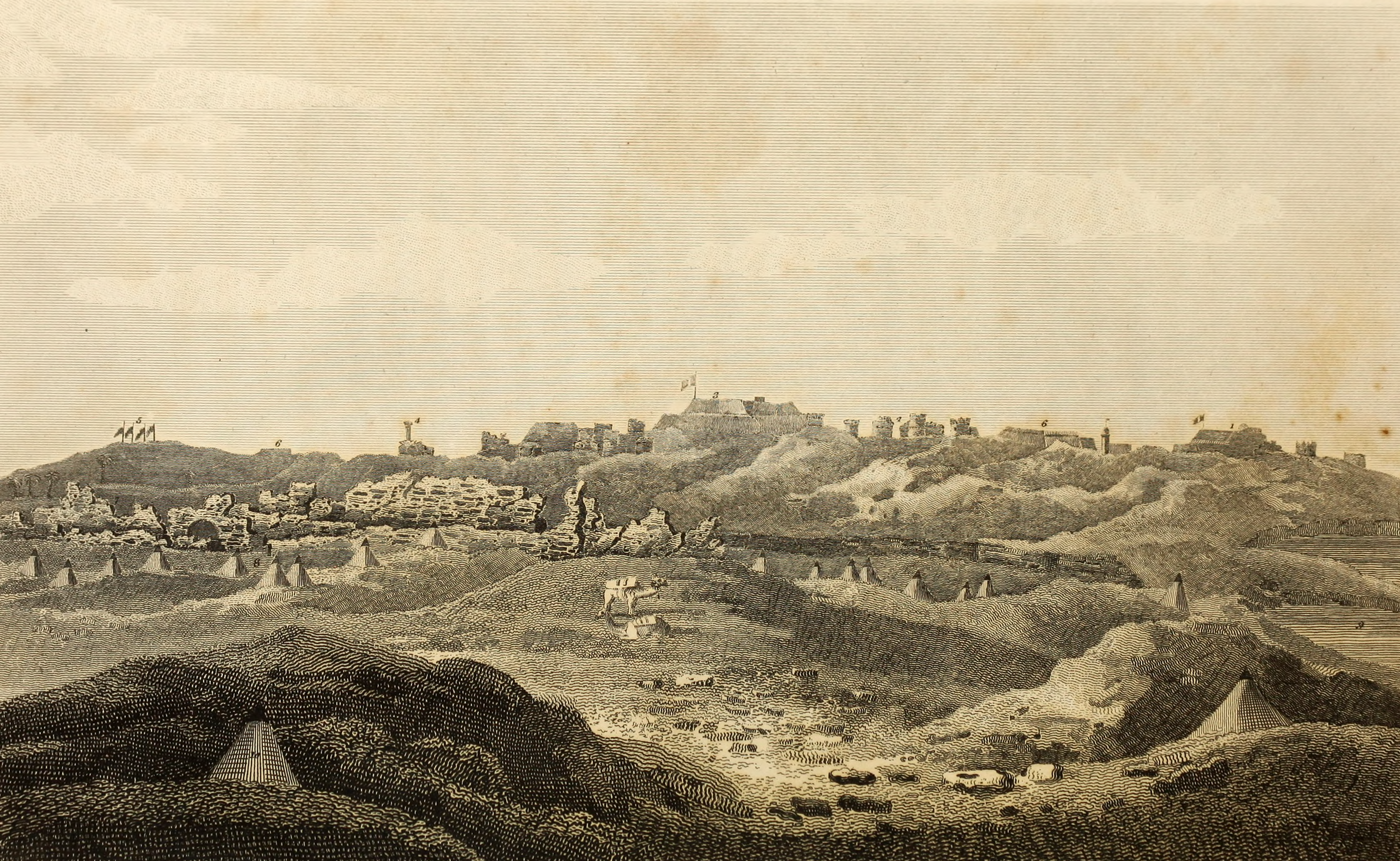
French fortifications at the siege of Alexandria

Coote's force embarked into small boats in the evening of 16 August. They accidentally scattered during the night, giving the French time to prepare for their landing, but Coote moved the landing point elsewhere to avoid this resistance. The force came ashore at around 10 a.m., and then busied itself bringing up stores. A portion of the force, not including Dyott, captured the stronghold of Fort Marabout on 21 August, opening the way for a larger attack. This began in the early morning of 22 August, with Dyott's regiment part of the left of the line of advance. The initial French defenders abandoned their positions and the British advanced quickly to within 1,400 yards (1.3 km) of the first major fortification, Fort des Bains, but were unable to do more because they lacked heavy artillery.

With the defences facing Coote much weaker than those on the east side, it was decided that the final attack would be made on the west and artillery was brought around to support it. The artillery bombardment commenced on 24 August, and two days later the French requested an armistice without Dyott having taken further part in the siege. The city capitulated on 2 September. Dyott and the 25th were subsequently sent to serve at Malta, arriving there on 12 October. They stayed there only briefly and on 30 October were moved on to Gibraltar, arriving 18 November. Dyott continued at Gibraltar until May 1802 when, the Peace of Amiens in effect, he returned to England on leave. He then took advantage of the peace with France and went travelling in Europe, visiting Spain, Italy, and being presented to Napoleon in Paris.

=== Napoleonic Wars ===
==== Home service ====
Dyott returned to England on 26 July and in September was summoned by George III to belatedly take up his role as aide de camp. On 26 December the 25th, still serving in the Gibraltar garrison, rebelled against the command of Prince Edward, Duke of Kent, and was put down by the remainder of the garrison. On 26 January 1803 Dyott was ordered back to Gibraltar to deal with the situation, but the order was later cancelled. He was appointed a brigadier-general on 4 June and ordered to go out with his regiment, that had since returned from Gibraltar, to command a brigade in the new West Indies campaign of the Napoleonic Wars. Before he could do so the 25th was redirected to serve in the Irish Command, and Dyott was moved to the staff there on 3 September, in command of Waterford.

When the king returned to Weymouth to recuperate from a manic episode in August 1804, Dyott left Ireland to join him. He spent this time in Weymouth, and also Windsor, escorting members of the Royal Family to the theatre and playing cards with Charlotte of Mecklenburg-Strelitz and her daughters. He returned to Ireland in January 1805. In March Dyott was translated to command the infantry in Dublin and the Eastern District, by September being located at the Curragh Camp. He continued in Ireland until September 1806 when he was given command of Sussex, part of the Southern District. His headquarters was at Hastings. Dyott was promoted to major-general on 25 April 1808. Still in close contact with the king, in September he recorded George's descent into blindness.

Dyott was given command of a brigade to serve in the Peninsular War on 25 December. He set out from Spithead on board HMS Fisgard on 14 January 1809, but on 18 January the Battle of Corunna took place and the army was evacuated from the Iberian Peninsula. Fisgard met with the ships on 26 January as they carried the army home. Dyott and the other general officers on Fisgard then transferred to the escorting HMS Alfred and returned to England with the army. Landing with part of the army at Portsmouth Dyott was appalled, describing "such miserable tattered beings I never saw, so wan and worn out". With his Peninsular command no longer viable, Dyott was instead sent to serve at Winchester.

==== Walcheren Campaign ====
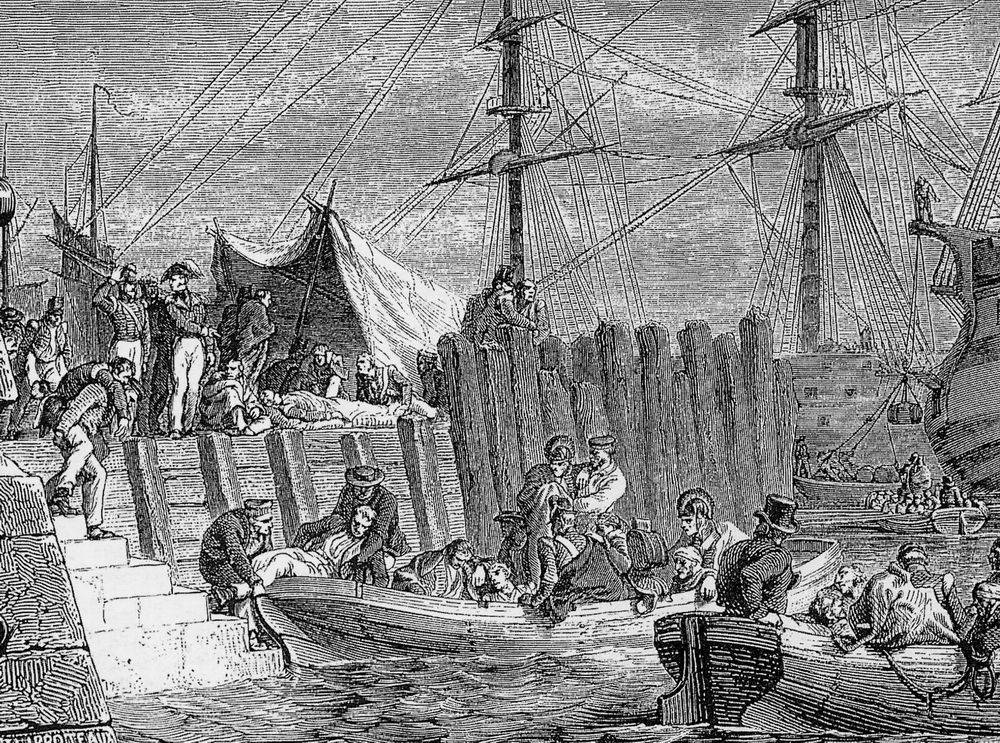
Ill soldiers being evacuated during the Walcheren Campaign, 30 August 1809

Dyott was given command of a brigade for the Walcheren Campaign in July. Within his brigade were three regiments of foot; the 6th, 50th, and 91st. It was part of Lieutenant-General George Gordon, Marquess of Huntly's division which was to capture the island of Cadzand while other units attacked Walcheren. They embarked at Ramsgate on 27 July and reached Cadzand on 29 July, but there was confusion over Huntly's orders and the Royal Navy did not have enough boats to land the entire force in one go. The sea was too rough to land that day, and on 30 July Huntly was put off by reports that the French had a garrison of 6–7,000 men on the island.

Dyott became greatly annoyed as preparations for landings were begun and cancelled several times; the operation was then cancelled on 3 August, with the division instead sent out to the Veerse Gat. This pleased Dyott, who thought that any attempt to land at Cadzand with the 600 men their boats could carry would have resulted in defeat. On 9 August the force was instead landed on Zuid-Beveland; the island was almost deserted of enemy soldiers and the British struggled more with the heat. Huntly's division stayed in occupation on Zuid-Beveland, although Dyott was present in the aftermath of the taking of Flushing to describe the "utterly impossible" destruction. By 20 August Dyott began to notice the onset of Walcheren fever amongst the British. Further operations for the army were cancelled on 27 August and Zuid-Beveland began to be evacuated.

Many of the brigades were sent home at this point, but on 29 August Dyott's was kept on as part of the Walcheren garrison. It arrived from Zuid-Beveland on 31 August with 500 men already sick. Without transport for these men they had to be left out on the Nieuw- en Sint Joosland beach in the heat; Dyott thought it the most distressing scene he had seen as a soldier. After several officers senior to Dyott returned to Britain he served as second in command on Walcheren between 14 September and 31 October. Hospitals were set up to treat the steadily increasing number of fever cases, with Dyott describing how in mid-September he visited the "miserable, dirty, stinking holes...the sick chambers of nearly 8,000 unfortunate men in fevers" at Middelburg. The evacuation of the army, and especially the sick, continued into October in which month 4,536 men were removed.

=== Final services ===
On 31 October Dyott returned to Britain, carrying despatches from Lieutenant-General Sir George Don to Harwich. This was the last active service of Dyott's career. In December he declined an invitation from Lieutenant-General Arthur Wellesley, Viscount Wellington, to join the Peninsular Army as a brigade commander. Having been away from his family for so long Dyott did not want to leave them again so soon and chose to decline any immediate staff appointment.

Dyott's next employment came in May 1810 when he was appointed Inspecting Officer of Militia for the Severn District, encompassing much of South Wales. Then in August he was moved to command the Inland District, with his headquarters at Lichfield. In 1811 he took command of a force consisting of the 15th Dragoons and Berkshire Militia with which he suppressed Luddism in Nottingham. He continued in command at Lichfield until 4 June 1813 when he was promoted to lieutenant-general. Dyott was not appointed to a new command after this, but on 7 April 1825 was given the colonelcy of the 63rd Regiment of Foot. Prince William Henry succeeded George IV, becoming William IV, in 1830, and Dyott was disappointed not to be remembered by his old friend, saying "Prince's promises are not permanent proofs". He was however promoted to general on 22 July the same year.

== Personal life and retirement ==
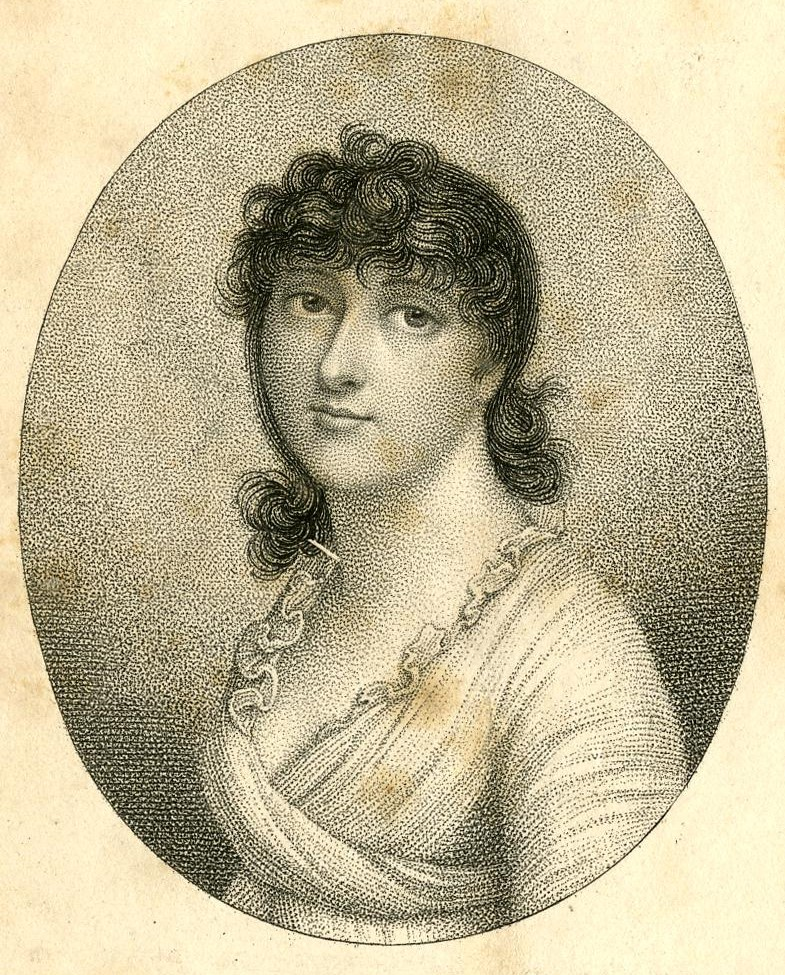
Eleanor Dyott, from the frontispiece of her 1821 memoirs

Dyott had initially courted Maria Gresley, the daughter of his friend, in 1801 but the relationship was cut short by Dyott's move to Egypt later in the year. In November 1805 Dyott met Eleanor Thompson, the daughter of Samuel Thompson of County Antrim, in Dublin. The pair were married there on 11 January 1806. Eleanor came with a rich dowry, providing £2,000 a year to Dyott, as well as properties in Ireland and the West Indies. The couple would go on to have two sons and a daughter together. In 1813 Eleanor began to suffer from a spinal disease and in the following year she requested a separation from Dyott, accusing him of adultery. He worked with Eleanor's family to attempt a reconciliation with her, but in September she eloped with a masseur and Dyott never saw her again.

Dyott's Divorce Act 1816
- Act of Parliament
- Parliament of the United Kingdom
- Long title: An Act to dissolve the Marriage of Lieutenant General William Dyott with Elinor, otherwise Eleanor, his now Wife, and to enable him to marry again, and for other Purposes therein mentioned.
- Citation: 56 Geo. 3. c. 76 Pr.

Dates
- Royal assent: 2 July 1816

Dyott subsequently began a private act of Parliament, Dyott's Divorce Act 1816 (56 Geo. 3. c. 76 Pr.), to divorce Eleanor. He successfully defended himself from the charge of adultery and had Eleanor's right to her properties and estate funds removed. The divorce was completed in 1815. Eleanor, going under her maiden name, fought back against the ruling in the following year with a bill in the Court of Common Pleas. She attempted to have the divorce bill overturned but failed. In 1817 she did however force Dyott to return her annuity from the estate properties.

The proceedings between Dyott and his wife were extensively covered by The Times, including intimate details such as an examination of their bedlinen. Eleanor published her story of the marital breakdown in 1821, titled Memoir of Mrs Dyott, in which she accused Dyott of only marrying her for the wealth she brought with her, and of using their divorce to take away the properties assigned to her in their marriage settlement. She died in 1841.

Dyott's older brother died in 1813, leaving him to inherit the family estates. His widowed sister in law continued to reside at Freeford Hall until her death in 1826, at which point Dyott took over the house. He was an active member of society in Staffordshire, becoming both a justice of the peace and deputy lieutenant for the county. Politically aligned as a Tory (describing himself as one of the "old school"), Dyott was good friends with his neighbour the politician Robert Peel. After the Peterloo Massacre in 1819 Dyott joined with other landowners in calling for an increase in yeomanry and the creation of town armed associations to assist in putting down popular unrest. Dyott was also an opponent of the Roman Catholic Relief Act 1829, Reform Act 1832, Slavery Abolition Act 1833, and repealing of the Corn Laws. Another of Dyott's close friendships, with Henry Paget, Marquess of Anglesey, was broken when the latter chose to support the Reform Act.

Troubled by seizures for most of the year, Dyott died of influenza at Freeford Hall on 7 May 1847, aged 87. Following family tradition, on 14 May he was buried by torchlight in the vault at St Mary's Church, Lichfield. He was succeeded by his eldest son, Captain Richard Dyott. Reputed to be an excellent staff officer, Dyott kept a series of diaries between 1781 and 1845, eventually reaching sixteen volumes. These were published in 1907 in two edited volumes as Dyott's Diary, 1781–1845. Initial reviews of Dyott's diaries were quick to differentiate his work from other more eloquent diarists such as Samuel Pepys, arguing that Dyott's writing was simple and quiet, but had great value through its plain sense and longevity, providing considerable detail and precision. The historian Oliver Warner says that Dyott and his writings are almost "too good to be true". He argues that Dyott was the substance behind the semi-fictitious idea of the "fine old English gentleman", comparing him to the character of Sir Roger de Coverley. In attempting to encapsulate Dyott's life and writings Arthur Ponsonby, Baron Ponsonby, describes him as "an honest, unreflecting, and unobservant man".

== Citations ==
Military offices
Preceded by Lord Balcarres	Colonel of the 63rd Regiment of Foot; 1825–1847	Succeeded by Sir Henry Watson
