= James Edmonstone =

Scottish army officer and agriculturalist

James Edmonstone FRSE (c. 1720 – 1793) was a Scottish army officer and agriculturalist. He was a joint founder of the Royal Society of Edinburgh in 1783. He was a close friend of fellow founder David Hume.

== Life and career ==
He was born in Old Newton House near Doune but the year is unclear. He was a younger brother of Sir Archibald Edmonstone, 1st Baronet of Duntreath and Newton. As a younger son he was not likely to inherit the baronetcy and followed a military career.

It seems possible that he met David Hume at the University of Edinburgh and seems equally likely that he (as Hume) dropped out without graduating due to a lack of respect for the professors.

At some point he joined the Perthshire Militia but may have transferred to the 3rd Dragoon Guards.

He served at rank of captain in Brittany. He rose to the rank of lieutenant colonel and served variously in Geneva, Siena, Paris and Dublin. Whilst having a military title a large proportion of this travel appears to have been in the role of "travelling tutor" to the family of John Stuart, 3rd Earl of Bute (Lord Mountstuart). Due to the age of Earl Stuart's youngest child this role would have ceased by 1775 or before.

In 1745 he (or his family) entertained Bonnie Prince Charlie for an evening at Old Newton House.

In 1785 he lived at Adam's Court in Edinburgh. Here he was visited by David Hume who also visited his house at Doune.

In 1793 he was admitted as a Member of the Highland and Agricultural Society of Scotland. He seems to have also owned land in Campbeltown.

He died at Old Newton House in Doune, north-west of Stirling on 24 June 1793.

== Personal life ==
In 1766 he married Mary Abercromby sister of Alexander Abercromby, Lord Abercromby and Sir Ralph Abercromby.

When he died the "Cambus Wallace" branch of the Edmonstone family died out, as he had no children.
