= 103rd Brigade =

103rd Brigade may refer to:

== Belarus ==
- 103rd Separate Guards Airborne Brigade

== Germany ==
- 103rd Panzer Brigade

== Russia ==
- 103rd Rocket Brigade

== Soviet Union ==
- 103rd Rocket Brigade
- 103rd Separate Guards Airborne Brigade

== Spain ==
- 103rd Mixed Brigade (Republican Spain)

== Ukraine ==
- 103rd Territorial Defense Brigade, a unit of the Ukrainian Territorial Defense Forces

== United Kingdom ==
- 103rd (Tyneside Irish) Brigade, British Army infantry formation during World War I
- 103rd Brigade, Royal Field Artillery, British Army unit during World War I
- 103rd (Suffolk) Brigade, Royal Field Artillery, British Army unit after World War I
- 103rd Anti-Aircraft Brigade (United Kingdom), British Army formation during World War II

== United States ==
- 103rd Field Artillery Brigade

== See also ==
- 103rd Division (disambiguation)
- 103rd Regiment (disambiguation)
