= 63rd (West Suffolk) Regiment of Foot =

- Active: 10 December 1756 – 1 July 1881
- Country: Kingdom of Great Britain (1756–1800); United Kingdom (1801–1881)
- Branch: British Army
- Type: Line Infantry
- Role: Infantry
- Size: One battalion (two battalions 1804–1814)
- Garrison/HQ: Wellington Barracks, Ashton-under-Lyne
- Nickname: "The Bloodsuckers"
- Colors: (Scarlet until 1881) Deep Green Facings, Silver Braided Lace
- March: Quick: Slow:
- Engagements: American Revolutionary War; French Revolutionary Wars; Napoleonic Wars; Crimean War

The 63rd Regiment of Foot was a British Army regiment raised in 1756. Under the Childers Reforms, it amalgamated with the 96th Regiment of Foot to form the Manchester Regiment in 1881.

== History ==
=== Formation and service in the Seven Years' War ===
The formation of the regiment was prompted by the expansion of the army as a result of the commencement of the Seven Years' War. On 25 August 1756 it was ordered that a number of existing regiments should raise a second battalion; among those chosen was the 8th Regiment of Foot. The 2nd Battalion of the 8th Regiment of Foot was formed on 10 December 1756 and renumbered as the 63rd Regiment of Foot on 21 April 1758. Later that year, the newly created 63rd, along with a number of other regiments and various other assets, set off for the West Indies. In January 1759 the regiment took part in the unsuccessful invasion of Martinique. Later that month the regiment took part in the invasion of Guadeloupe: after the Royal Navy bombarded Basse-Terre, the British troops landed on the west part of the island, near Fort Royal, a large citadel. By 24 January, British troops had entered the main town: the citadel there had been abandoned.

The regiment suffered a number of attacks while garrisoning the citadel, the rest of the force having moved to the more hospitable east of the island. During one attack, the regiment's commanding officer Lieutenant-Colonel Peter Desbrisay was killed. The regiment remained in the West Indies for a further five years.

=== American War of Independence ===
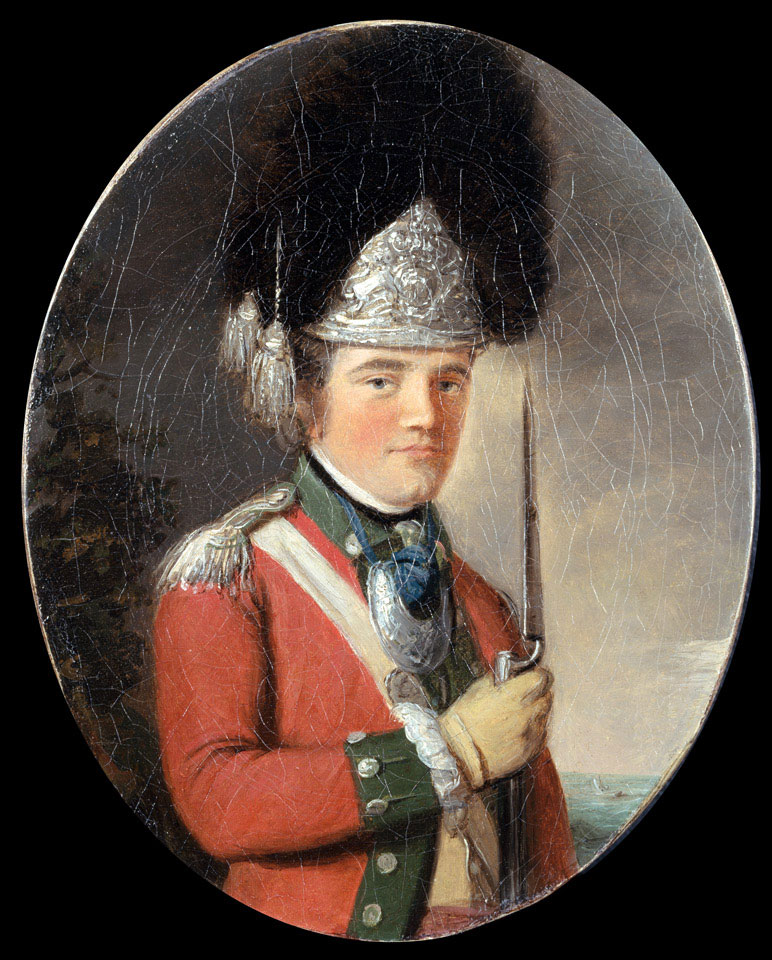
c. 1775 portrait of a regimental grenadier officer

In 1764 the regiment reached Ireland. In 1775 the regiment arrived in America in response to a request for reinforcements due to the outbreak of the American War of Independence. The regiment took part in the Battle of Bunker Hill in June 1775, with a third attack, which ended in a bayonet charge, finally breaking the Americans.

The regiment remained in Boston after the battle, the town becoming increasingly more uneasy to be in. Finally, in March 1776 the regiment, along with the rest of the forces in Boston, departed, heading for Halifax in Canada. The regiment took part in the Battle of Long Island in August 1776, a devastating blow against the Americans, though astonishingly, the American leader General George Washington managed to reverse the blow that had been struck against much of the Continental Army's morale in this battle soon after. Grenadier and Light companies of the regiment also took part in the Battle of Brandywine in September 1777 and the Battle of Germantown in October 1777. The main force of the regiment took part in the Battle of Forts Clinton and Montgomery in October 1777. The regiment then moved to Philadelphia and took part in the Battle of Monmouth in June 1778.

In 1780 the regiment became involved in the campaign in the Carolinas taking part in the siege and subsequent capture of Charleston. That year the mounted company of the regiment, augmented by a detachment from Tarleton's Legion under the command of the dashing, Banastre Tarleton, attacked and captured an American cavalry unit. The regiment also took part in number of battles as part of the forces commanded by Lord Cornwallis over the next two years, as well as taking part in another engagement near Camden in April 1781, as part of a force under the command of General Francis Rawdon. In 1782 the regiment was designated the 63rd (West Suffolk) Regiment of Foot.

=== French Revolutionary and Napoleonic Wars ===
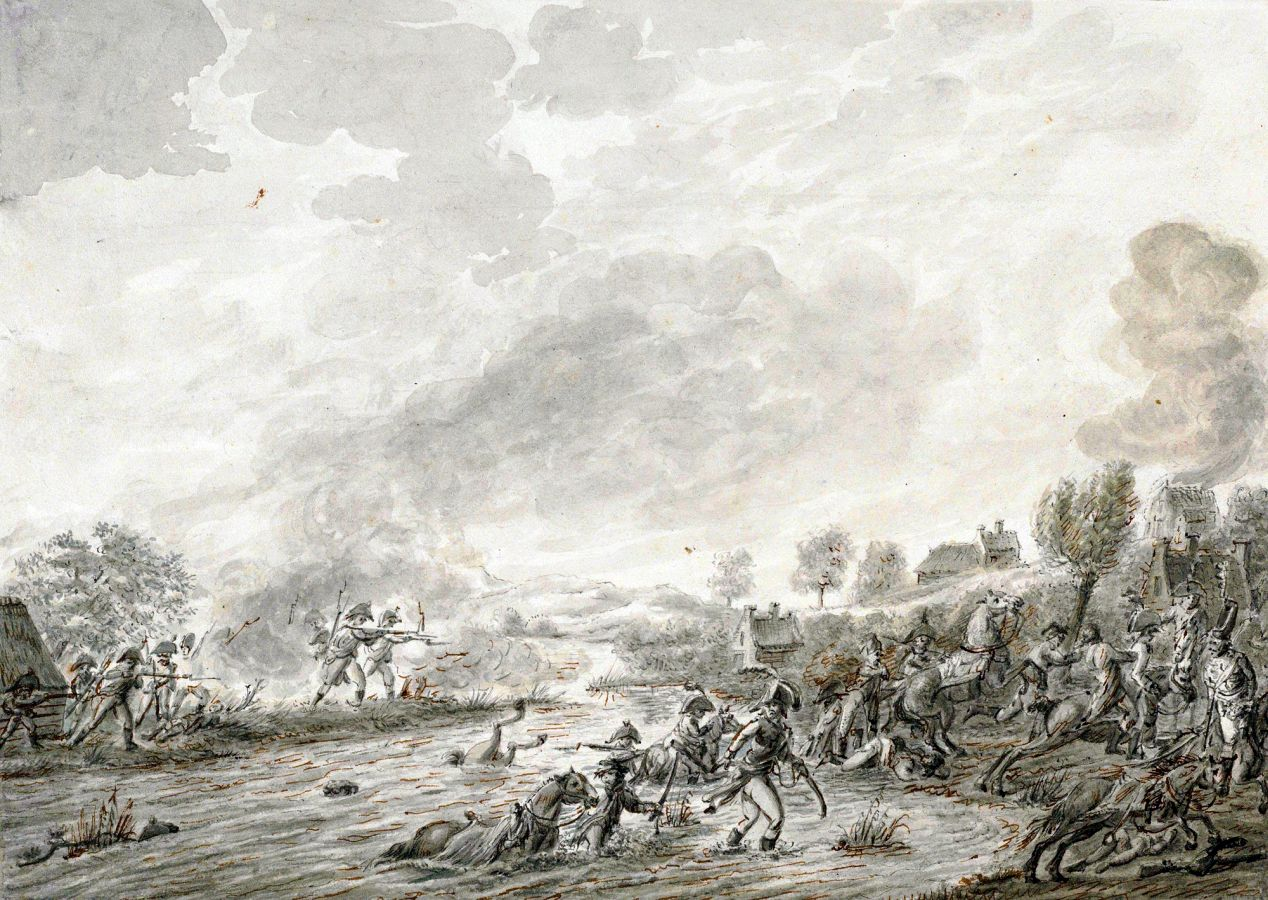
The Battle of Alkmaar, which the regiment fought in

In 1794 the regiment joined British forces already taking part in the Flanders Campaign. The regiment was involved in a number of actions before the British forces withdrew from the Netherlands in 1795. That same year, the regiment were part of a force designed to take a number of Caribbean islands under Dutch and French control. However, their transport ship sank, with the loss of two companies from the regiment, en route to the islands. The regiment took part in a variety of operations on the islands in the Caribbean, including helping to put down Fédon's rebellion in the Grenada in 1796. It remaining in the region until 1799, when they departed for home. In August 1799 the regiment took part in the Anglo-Russian invasion of Holland, seeing action at the Battle of Alkmaar in October 1799. In November 1801 the regiment joined the garrison at Gibraltar and, in 1803, it was deployed to Ireland.

A second battalion was raised in 1804. In 1807 the 1st battalion was involved in an expedition to Madeira, a Portuguese-controlled territory, under the command of Major-General William Beresford. Once the expeditionary forces landed, the Portuguese Governor agreed to all demands made by the British forces. In February 1808 the 1st battalion was stationed in Barbados. It took part the expedition to Martinique, which the British force captured. On 9 April 1809, a detachment from the 1st battalion was serving on the Treasury store-ship Emma, and so shared in the prize money for the French brig Navigateur for which Emma was a joint captor with sundry other ships. (Note: A fourth-class share of the prize money, the amount for a sergeant of the regiment, was £8 1s 7½d; a sixth-class share, that of an ordinary soldier, was worth £2 13s 10½d.) The 1st battalion became the garrison for island, suffering heavily from diseases one would expect in such tropical weather at that time. In January 1810, part of the 1st battalion took part in the capture of Guadeloupe, a duty the regiment had participated in many years before. The 1st battalion returned to Martinique and finally departed the Caribbean in 1819.

Meanwhile, the 2nd battalion took part in the disastrous Walcheren Campaign in autumn 1809, suffering from terrible fever while assisting in the capture of a number of towns on the island.

=== The Victorian era ===
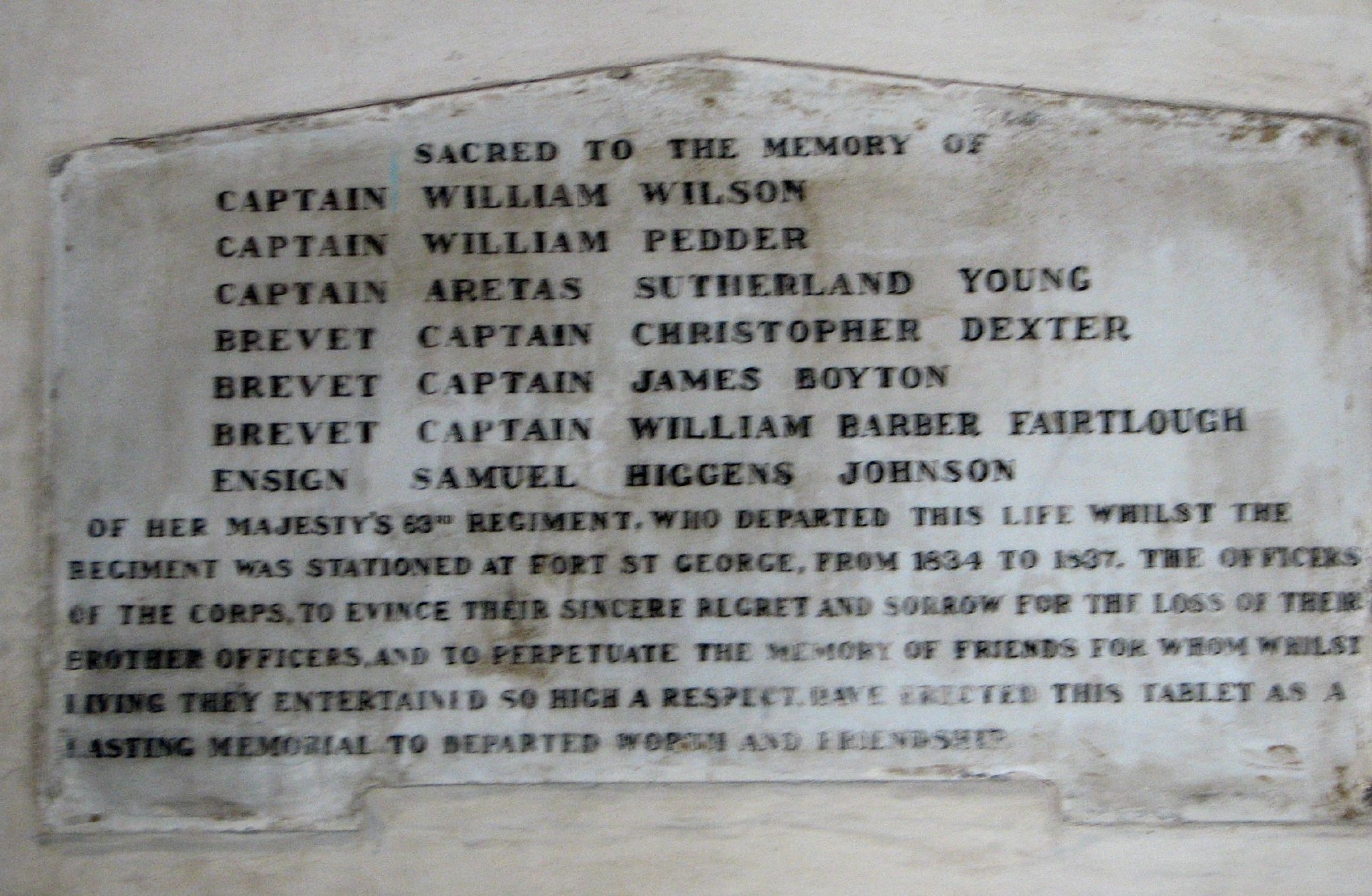
Memorial to the men of the 63rd Regiment, St. Mary's Church, Fort St. George, Madras, India

In 1820, the regiment were deployed to Ireland, a deployment that would last until 1826. The regiment was involved in an expedition to Portugal due to fears of impending insurrection in the country and landed there in January 1827. The rebel cause largely subsided, thanks largely in part due to the expedition made by the British forces.

In 1829, the regiment began providing escorts for convict ships traveling to New South Wales and Van Diemen's Land (now Tasmania). The rest of the regiment became garrison troops in the latter colony. A detachment of the regiment was present at the foundation ceremony of Perth in 1829, and had arrived in Western Australia that same year, on the warship HMS Sulphur. The officer commanding the detachment of the regiment at the ceremony, Captain Frederick Chidley Irwin, would later twice serve as administrator of Western Australia. The regiment transferred from Australia to India in 1833. The regiment deployed to Mawlamyine in Burma in 1838, returned to India in 1842, and then embarked for England in 1847.

=== The Crimean War ===
The regiment landed in the Kalamita Bay in August 1854 as part of the 4th Division for service in the Crimean War. The regiment took part in the Battle of Inkerman in November 1854 and was engaged in extensive hand-to-hand fighting. At one point, both colour bearers fell: Ensign James Hulton Clutterbuck, carrying the Queen's Colour, and Ensign Heneage Twysden, who was mortally wounded carrying the Regimental Colour. The regiment also took part in the Siege of Sevastopol and was part of a force created to assault a part of the great fortress of Sevastopol on 8 September 1855, during the last day of the long siege, known as Battle of the Great Redan.

=== Amalgamation ===
After leaving the Crimea, the regiment sailed for Nova Scotia in 1856. Upon their arrival at the dockyard in Halifax, a large crowd of many thousands came out to greet the regiment, as if they were a modern-day football team. The regiment returned home in 1865 and then departed for India in 1870.

As part of the Cardwell Reforms of the 1870s, where single-battalion regiments were linked together to share a single depot and recruiting district in the United Kingdom, the 63rd was linked with the 96th Regiment of Foot, and assigned to district no. 16 at Wellington Barracks in Ashton-under-Lyne. On 1 July 1881 the Childers Reforms came into effect and the regiment amalgamated with the 96th Regiment of Foot to form the Manchester Regiment.

== Battle honours ==
Battle honours won by the regiment were:

- War of the Second Coalition: Egmont-op-Zee
- Napoleonic Wars: Martinique 1809, Guadeloupe 1810
- Crimean War: Alma, Inkerman, Sevastopol
- Second Anglo-Afghan War: Afghanistan 1879-80

== Colonels of the Regiment ==
Colonels of the Regiment were:

=== 63rd Regiment of Foot ===
- 1758–1760: Maj-Gen. David Watson
- 1760–1764: Gen. Sir William Boothby, Bt.
- 1764–1765: Lt-Gen. Sir Richard Pierson, KB
- 1765–1768: Gen. Sir Charles Hotham, 8th Baronet, KB
- 1768–1782: Lt-Gen. Francis Grant

=== 63rd (the West Suffolk) Regiment of Foot - (1782) ===
- 1782–1788: Lt-Gen. Hon Alexander Leslie
- 1788–1789: Col. George Waldegrave, 4th Earl Waldegrave
- 1789–1825: Gen. Alexander Lindsay, 6th Earl of Balcarres
- 1825–1847: Gen. William Dyott
- 1847–1850: Maj-Gen. Sir Henry Watson, CB
- 1850–1868: Gen. Sir Thomas Kenah, KCB
- 1868–1873: Lt-Gen. Arthur Cunliffe van Notten Pole
- 1873–1877: Gen. Thomas Maitland Wilson
- 1877–1881: Gen. Sir Richard Waddy, KCB

== Sources ==
- Frothingham, Richard Jr. (1851). History of the Siege of Boston and of the Battles of Lexington, Concord, and Bunker Hill, Second Edition. Boston, MA: Charles C. Little and James Brown. OCLC 2138693.
- Slack, James (1884). The History of the Late 63rd (west Suffolk) Regiment. London: Army and Navy Cooperative Society.
