= 103rd Regiment of Foot (King's Irish Infantry) =

- Active: 1781–1784
- Country: Kingdom of Great Britain
- Branch: British Army
- Type: Line Infantry
- Role: Infantry
- Size: One battalion

The 103rd Regiment of Foot (King's Irish Infantry) was a British Army regiment raised in 1781. Ralph Abercromby was colonel, of the regiment throughout its existence. It served entirely in Ireland before being disbanded in 1784.
