= Ralph Abercromby =

British Army officer, politician and colonial administrator (1734–1801)

Lieutenant-General Sir Ralph Abercromby KB
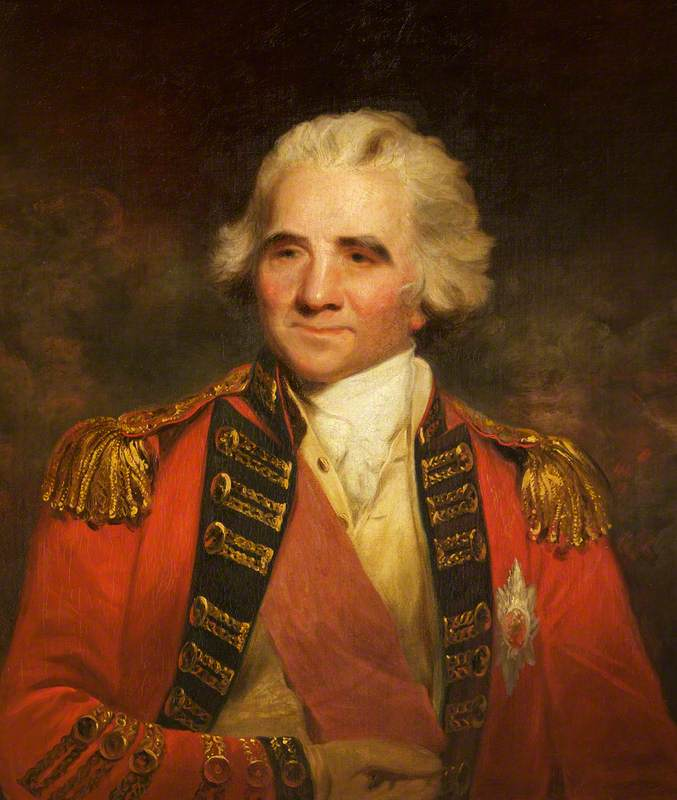
- Portrait by John Hoppner, c. 1798
- Born: 7 October 1734; Menstrie, Clackmannanshire
- Died: 28 March 1801 (aged 66); Near Alexandria, Ottoman Egypt
- Burial place: Fort Saint Elmo, Valletta; 35°54′10″N 14°31′12″E
- Relatives: Alexander Abercromby, Lord Abercromby (brother); Sir Robert Abercromby (brother)
- Military career
- Allegiance: Great Britain; United Kingdom
- Branch: British Army
- Service years: 1756–1801
- Rank: Lieutenant-general
- Conflicts: Seven Years' War; West German campaign; Battle of Warburg; French Revolutionary Wars; Flanders campaign; Battle of Tourcoing; Battle of Boxtel; West Indies campaign; Fédon's rebellion; Anglo-Spanish War (1796–1808); Invasion of Trinidad (1797); Battle of San Juan (1797); Anglo-Russian invasion of Holland; Battle of Callantsoog; Battle of Krabbendam; Battle of Castricum; Irish Rebellion of 1798; French invasion of Egypt and Syria; Battle of Abukir (1801); Battle of Mandora; Battle of Alexandria (1801) (DOW)
- Other work: Member of Parliament; Governor of Trinidad; Lord Lieutenant of Clackmannanshire

Lieutenant-General Sir Ralph Abercromby (7 October 1734 – 28 March 1801) was a British Army officer, politician and colonial administrator who served as the governor of Trinidad in 1797. Rising to the rank of lieutenant general in the British army, he was commander-in-chief, Ireland, and was noted for his military service during the French Revolutionary Wars, which included defeating the French invasion of Egypt and Syria.

== Early life ==
Ralph Abercromby was born on 7 October 1734 at Menstrie Castle, Clackmannanshire. He was the second (but eldest surviving) son of George Abercromby (1705–1800), a lawyer and descendant of the Abercromby family of Birkenbog, Aberdeenshire and Mary Dundas (died 1767), daughter of Ralph Dundas of Manour, Perthshire. His younger brothers include the advocate Alexander Abercromby, Lord Abercromby and General Robert Abercromby.

The family had acquired Menstrie Castle in 1719 but their main family house was the nearby Tullibody House which they had built around 1700. Much of Ralph's childhood was spent in the latter.

Abercromby's education was begun by a private tutor, then continued at the school of Mr Moir in Alloa, then considered one of the best in Scotland despite its Jacobite leanings. Ralph attended Rugby School from 12 June 1748, where he remained until he was 18. Between 1752 and 1753, he was a student at the University of Edinburgh. There he studied moral and natural philosophy and civil law, and was regarded by his professors as sound rather than brilliant. He completed his studies at Leipzig University in Germany from autumn 1754, taking more detailed studies in civil law with a view to a career as an advocate.

== Career ==
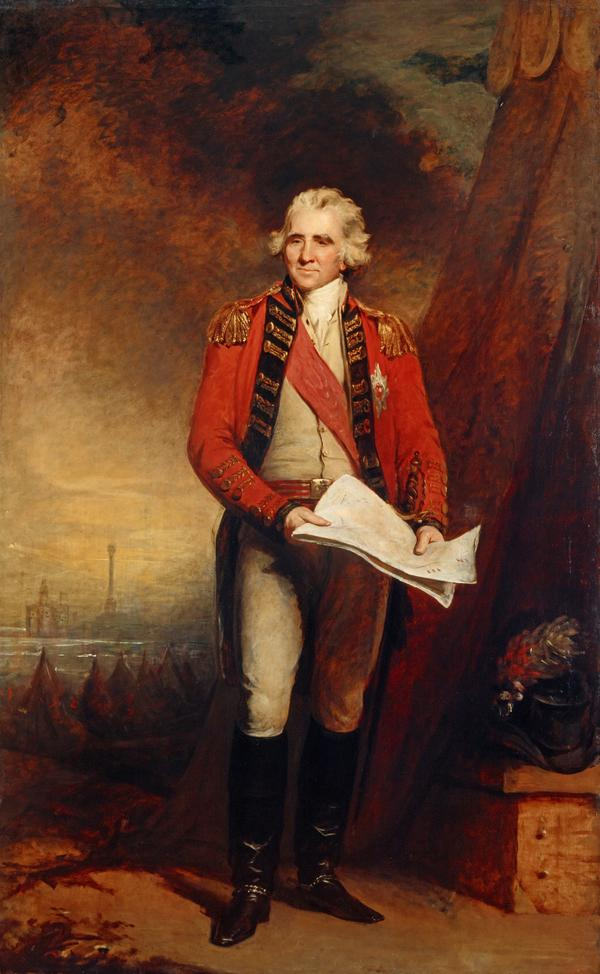
1852 portrait of Abercromby by Colvin Smith

On returning from the continent, Abercromby expressed a strong preference for the military profession, and a cornet's commission was accordingly obtained for him (March 1756) in the 3rd Dragoon Guards. He served with his regiment in the Seven Years' War, and thus, the opportunity afforded him of studying the methods of Frederick the Great, which moulded his military character and formed his tactical ideas. Abercromby rose through the intermediate grades to the rank of lieutenant-colonel of the regiment (1773) and brevet colonel in 1780, and in 1781, he became colonel of the newly raised 103rd Regiment of Foot. When the regiment was disbanded in 1783, he retired on half pay.

In 1774 Abercromby entered Parliament as MP for Clackmannanshire (1774–1780). In 1791 he commissioned a large townhouse at 66 Queen Street, Edinburgh. During the American War of Independence, he was a strong supporter of the Patriot cause and chose to serve in Ireland to avoid having to fight in North America.

When France declared war on Great Britain in 1793, Abercromby returned to active duty. He was appointed commander of a brigade under the Duke of York for service in the Netherlands, where he commanded the advanced guard in the action at Le Cateau. During the 1794 withdrawal to Holland, he commanded the allied forces in the action at Boxtel and was wounded directing operations at Fort St Andries on the Waal. In 1795 he commissioned a townhouse at 66 Queen Street, Edinburgh.

In July 1795 Abercromby was nominated by Secretary of State for War Henry Dundas to lead an expedition to the West Indies. That same month he had been made a Knight of the Bath and in August Lieutenant Governor of the Isle of Wight – a reward for his services but also possibly an incentive to lead the army in the Caribbean. The appointment of Abercromby as Commander-in-Chief of the Leeward and Windward Islands was officially announced on 5 August.

On 17 March 1796 Abercromby arrived in Carlisle Bay, Barbados onboard HMS Arethusa. A third of the 6,000 troops that had arrived on the island before him had already been sent on to Saint Vincent and Grenada, leaving the general with 3,700 soldiers at his disposal. Control of much of Saint Vincent had been lost to rebelling French planters and native Caribs since early 1795, while Grenada was in the midst of an insurrection led by Julien Fédon. The reinforcements to Grenada allowed General Nicolls to attack enemy posts south of Port Royal on 25 March, preventing further French reinforcements from Guadeloupe. Three months later Abercromby arrived with further reinforcements and attacked Fedon's camp on 19 June, routing the insurgents and ending the rebellion.

The British fleet sailed on 25 April 1796 for Saint Lucia, landing the following day and establishing a beachhead. The French were soon repelled and retreated to the fort at Morne Fortune, which Abercromby decided to besiege. The garrison under General Goyrand surrendered to the British army 26 May. The island had been retaken at the cost of 566 men. A force of around 4,000 was left to hold Saint Lucia under the command of Colonel John Moore before Abercromby left for Saint Vincent at the beginning of June.

Abercromby arrived on Saint Vincent 7 June with a force of just over 4,000. He marched his troops near to the insurgent base at Vigie Ridge and camped nearby as the British started to execute an encircling movement: Quartermaster General John Knox manoeuvred his men on the seaward side in order to prevent the enemy retreating north, and Lieutenant Colonel Dickens used the 34th Regiment as a diversion on the opposite side. Knox was able to cut off communications with the Vigie, whilst Dickens ousted the nearby Caribs to complete the encirclement. The black French commander, Marinier, signed terms of surrender on 11 June and the Caribs did 4 days later. The British took around 200 prisoners, with another 200 escaping into the jungle. Although some of the Caribs would remain in resistance until October, the rebellion had effectively been put down at the cost of 17 officers and 168 men killed or wounded.

In February 1797 the General Abercromby launched the invasion of Trinidad. His squadron sailed through the Bocas and anchored off the coast of Chaguaramas. The Spanish Governor Chacón decided to capitulate without fighting. Trinidad thus became a British crown colony, with a French-speaking population of Catholic faith and Spanish laws. British rule was formalized under the Treaty of Amiens (1802).

Afterward Abercromby secured possession of the settlements of Demerara and Essequibo in South America. A major assault on the port of San Juan, Puerto Rico, in April 1797 failed after fierce fighting where both sides suffered heavy losses.

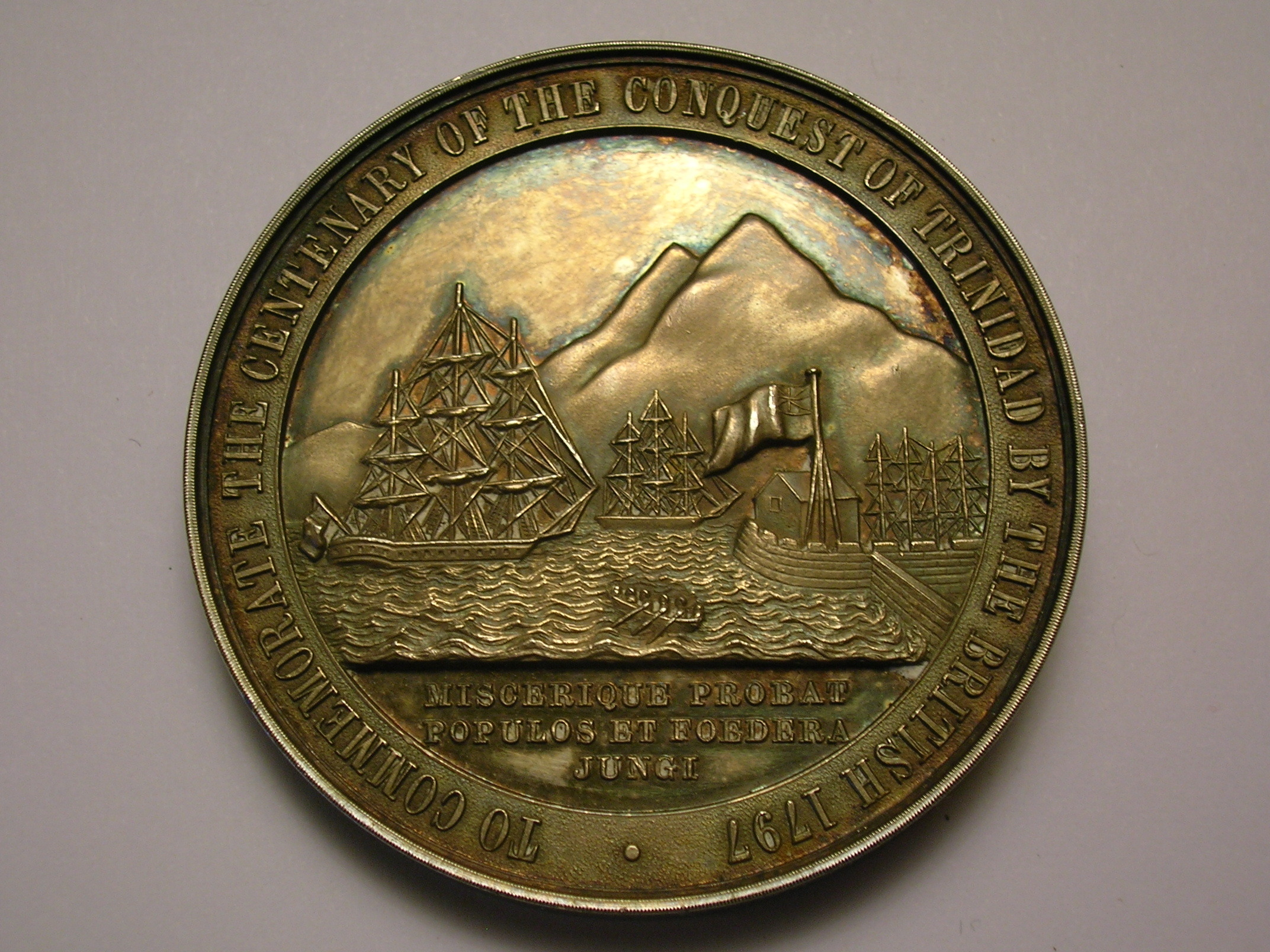
A medallion commemorating the British capture of Trinidad in 1797

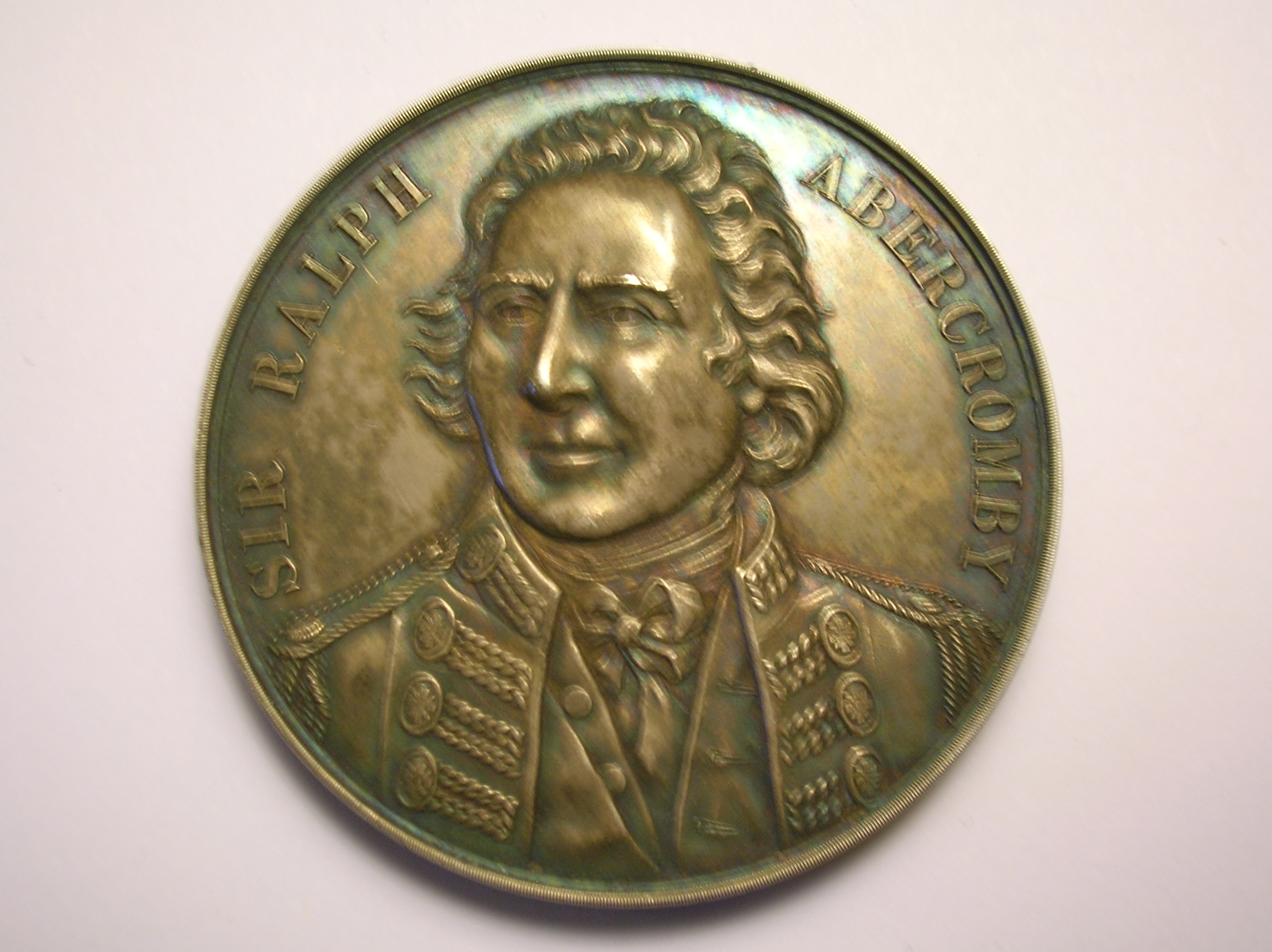
A medallion commemorating Abercromby for his role in the capture of Trinidad

Abercromby returned to Europe and, in reward for his services, was appointed colonel of the 2nd (Royal North British) Regiment of Dragoons. He was also made Lieutenant-Governor of the Isle of Wight, Governor of Fort George and Fort Augustus in the Scottish Highlands, and promoted to the rank of Lieutenant-general. He again entered Parliament as the member for Clackmannanshire from 1796 to 1798.

In 1798 Abercromby was made Commander-in-Chief of the forces in Ireland, then in rebellion and anticipating French intervention. He took the unusual step of publicly criticising the command of his predecessor, The 2nd Earl of Carhampton, for bequeathing an army "in a state of licentiousness, which must render it formidable to everyone but the enemy". To quote the biographic entry in the 1888 Encyclopædia Britannica,

"[H]e laboured to maintain the discipline of the army, to suppress the rising rebellion, and to protect the people from military oppression, with the care worthy of a great general and an enlightened and beneficent statesman. When he was appointed to the command in Ireland, an invasion of that country by the French was confidently anticipated by the British government. He used his utmost efforts to restore the discipline of an army that was utterly disorganized; and, as a first step, he anxiously endeavoured to protect the people by re-establishing the supremacy of the civil power, and not allowing the military to be called out, except when it was indispensably necessary for the enforcement of the law and the maintenance of order. Finding that he received no adequate support from the head of the Irish government and that all his efforts were opposed and thwarted by those who presided in the councils of Ireland, he resigned the command. His departure from Ireland was deeply lamented by the reflecting portion of the people, and was speedily followed by those disastrous results which he had anticipated, and which he so ardently desired and had so wisely endeavoured to prevent."

Abercromby was replaced in Ireland by Gerrard Lake who favoured an aggressive approach in putting down the rebellion, as opposed to Abercromby's attempts at conciliation.

After holding for a short period the office of commander-in-chief in Scotland, Abercromby was again called to command under the Duke of York in the 1799 Anglo-Russian expedition against the Napoleonic Dutch Republic. Abercromby conducted a textbook amphibious landing at Callantsoog establishing a beachhead and driving the Franco-Dutch army inland at Krabbendam. The high watermark of British success came when a squadron of the Dutch fleet then surrendered and the Anglo-Russian army advanced through North Holland capturing the cities of Hoorn, Enkhuizen and Medemblik. However, with the Duke of York now in overall command Anglo-Russian fortunes turned sour following the reverse at Castricum. The expected Orangist uprising in the North Holland peninsula never materialized and allies withdrew to their original positions. The expedition ended with the signing of the Convention of Alkmaar in which the Anglo-Russian force was allowed to withdraw.

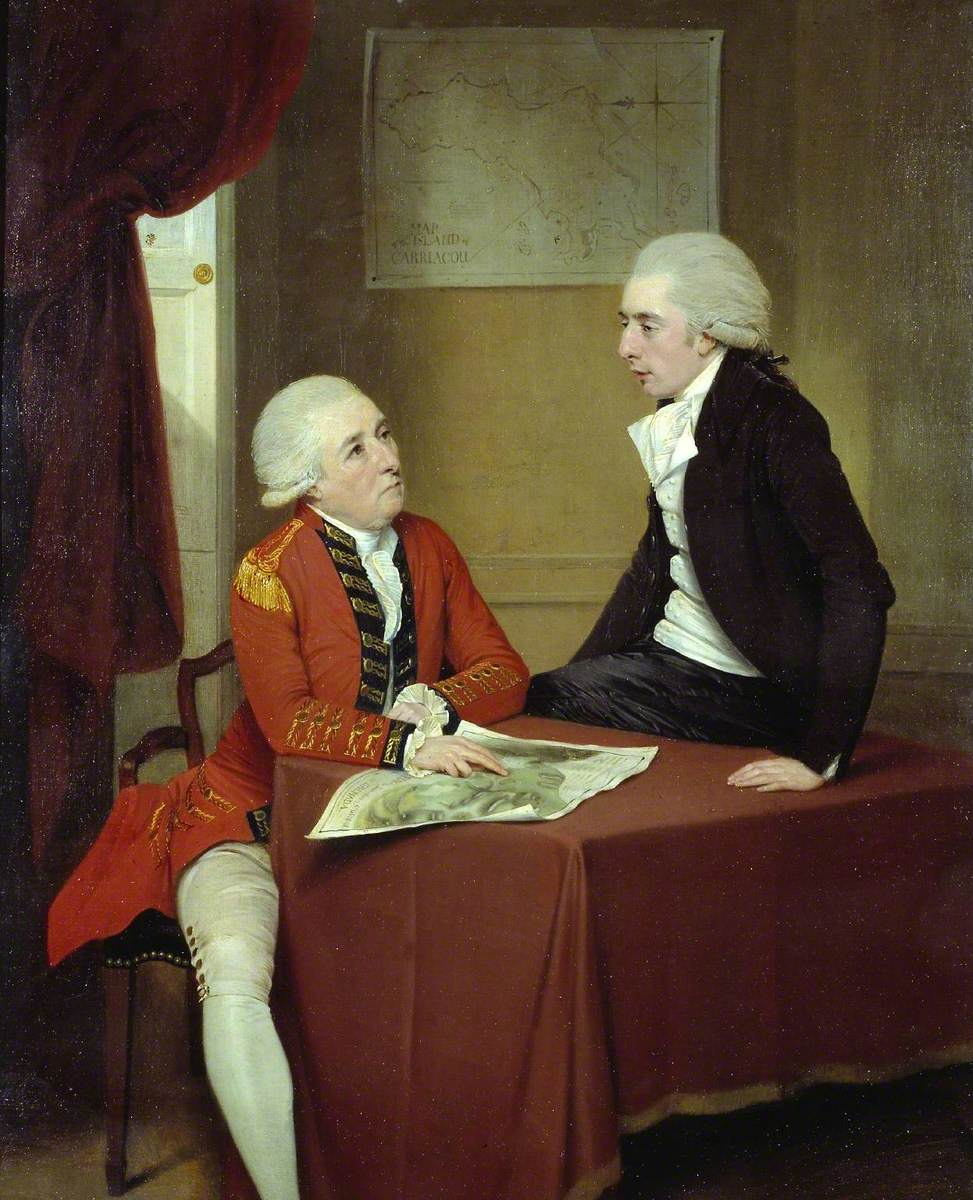
General Abercromby reviewing battle plans, by John Downman

After spending time with Dundas over Christmas, Abercromby was summoned to London 21 January 1800. The Portuguese, concerned that they were under threat from Spain, requested British support and wanted Abercromby to lead their army. However, Abercromby refused to serve under a foreign ruler and would only take command of a joint army. Before he could leave for Portugal to inspect their defences and army, the resignation of General Charles Stuart in the Mediterranean in April led to a change of plans. The Austrian plan was that Abercromby could create a distraction from the activities of General Michael von Melas in North Italy by landing at various points on the Italian coast. Abercromby received instruction from London to send 2,500–3,000 men to take French-occupied Malta. Thereafter, he was to receive a further 6,000 men to assist the Austrians. General Charles O'Hara in Gibraltar was pleased with the appointment, for while Stuart had been hot-tempered and difficult to work with, Abercromby was "a reasonable, considerate good soldier, and listens with temper and patience to every proposal made to him". However, delays caused by the weather meant that the situation in Italy had changed drastically by the time that Abercromby reached Minorca 22 June.

In 1801 Abercromby was sent with an army to recover Egypt from France. His experience in the Netherlands and the West Indies particularly fitted him for this new command, as was proved when he carried his army in health, in spirits, and with the requisite supplies to the destined scene of action despite great difficulties. The debarkation of the troops at Aboukir, in the face of strenuous opposition, is justly ranked among the most daring and brilliant exploits of the British army.

== Battle of Alexandria, 1801 ==
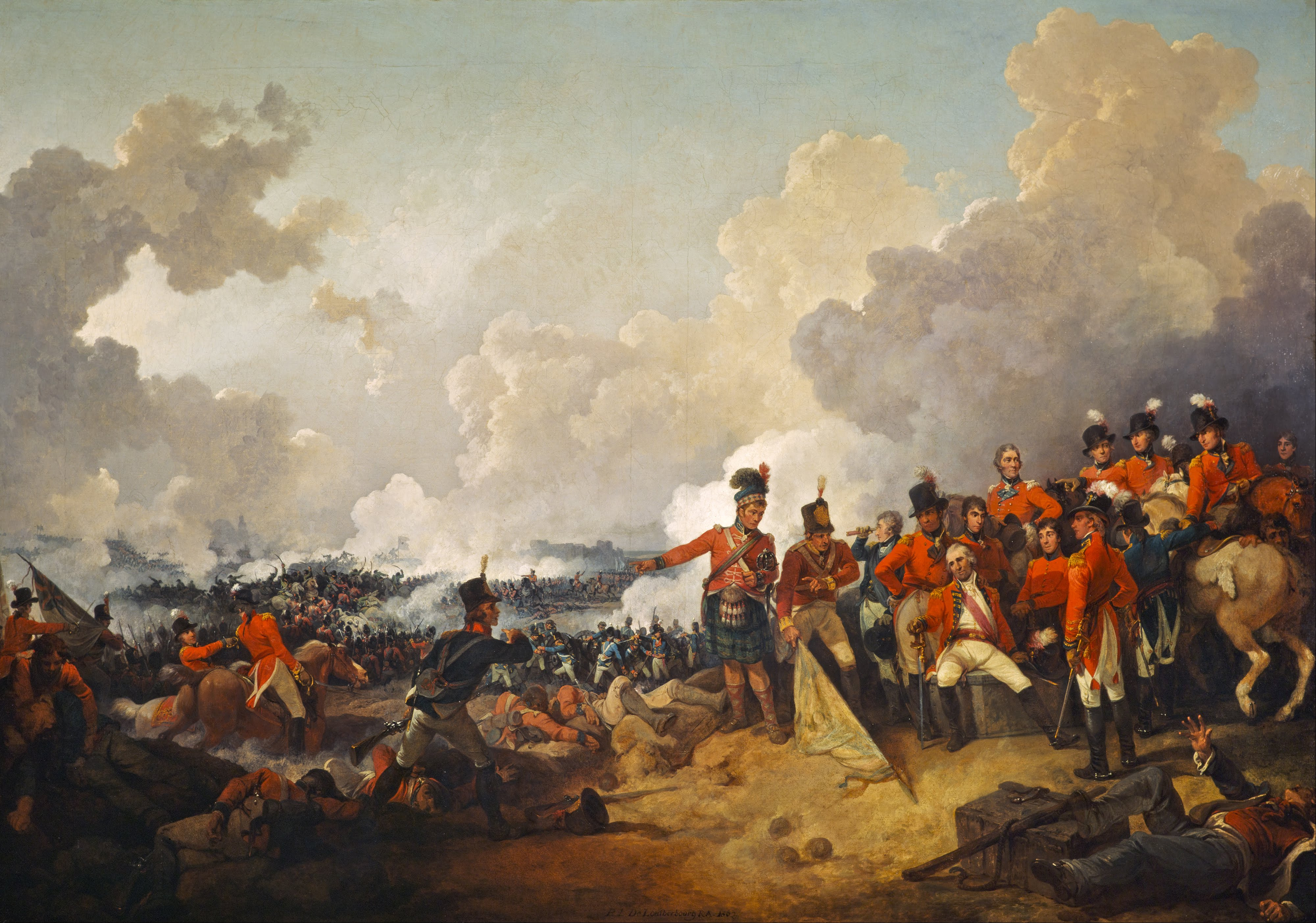
The Battle of Alexandria, 21 March 1801 by Philip James de Loutherbourg. Abercromby sits mortally wounded in the painting's centre.

Abercromby commanded the expedition to the Mediterranean in 1800, and after successfully landing the army at Aboukir and driving the French inland, defeated an attempted French counter-attack at Alexandria, 21 March 1801. Jacques-François Menou had arrived from Cairo and was determined to defeat the British advance. On 20 March, the British forces extended across the isthmus, the right wing resting upon the ruins of Nicopolis and the sea, the left on the lake of Abukir. The line faced generally south-west towards the city, the reserve division under Major-General Sir John Moore.

Abercromby anticipated a night attack, so the British slept in position under arms. At 3:30 a.m. French forces attacked and drove in the British outposts. Moving forward rapidly with great gallantry from the left, Lanusse launched the attack with Valentin's brigade in column along the seashore, and to their right Silly's brigade against the British entrenchments around the roman ruins. The brunt of the attack fell upon Moore's command, and in particular upon the 28th (North Gloucestershire) Regiment of Foot. The British repulsed this first assault, during which both Silly and Lanusse were hit.

“General Lanusse saw that General Valentin had left the seashore, and was within the re-entering angle of the redoubt and the Roman camp, where the cross fire of the enemy held him back. General Lanusse marched to this spot, encouraged the men, and made them advance. The worthy general was hit in the thigh by a ball from a gun-boat; four grenadiers tried to carry him off, but a second ball killed two of these brave fellows". Soon Rampon's command in the centre was engaged, and despite disorientation in the dark, penetrated between the front and rear wing of the 42nd Regiment of Foot. A confused fight ensued in the ruins, in which the French troops were all either killed or captured with the 42nd taking their colour. Other British regiments engaged were the 23rd Regiment of Foot, 40th (the 2nd Somersetshire) Regiment of Foot and 58th (Rutlandshire) Regiment of Foot, together with Stuart's Minorca Regiment.

The front and rear ranks of the 28th Foot were simultaneously engaged to both their front and rear. During the attack of Roize's second line, Abercromby was briefly captured by French dragoons, but quickly rescued by a highlander of the 42nd. About this time he received a bullet wound to the thigh which would eventually prove fatal, though he remained on the field and in command to the end. Rampon's renewed infantry attack on the centre was repulsed by the Guards brigade, supported by Coote's brigade, and the left wing maintained its position with ease, but the French cavalry for the second time came to close quarters with the reserve. The 42nd, twice charged by cavalry, had but 13 men wounded by the sabre. Part of the French losses were caused by the gunboats which lay close inshore and cannonaded the left flank of the French columns, and by a heavy naval gun which was placed in battery near the position of 28 March. The battle was won and was a great victory, with Menou forced to retreat to the city of Alexandria. On 17 August, British forces laid siege to Alexandria and later captured the city which effectively ended French control of Egypt and Syria.

== Death ==
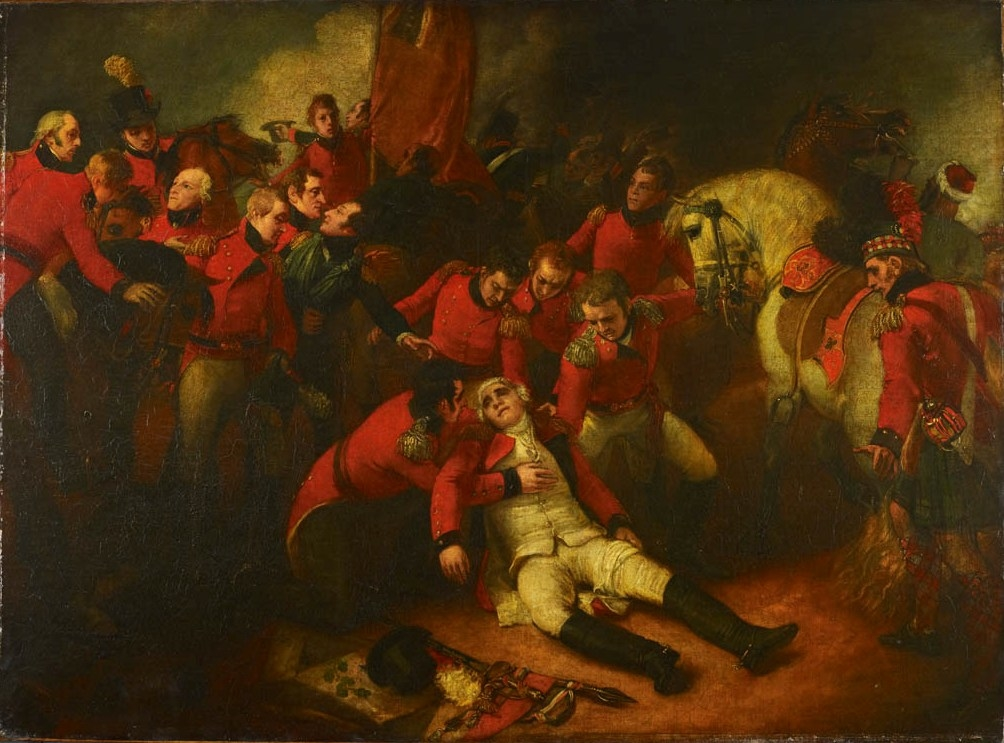
Death of Sir Ralph Abercromby at the Battle of Alexandria by Thomas Stothard

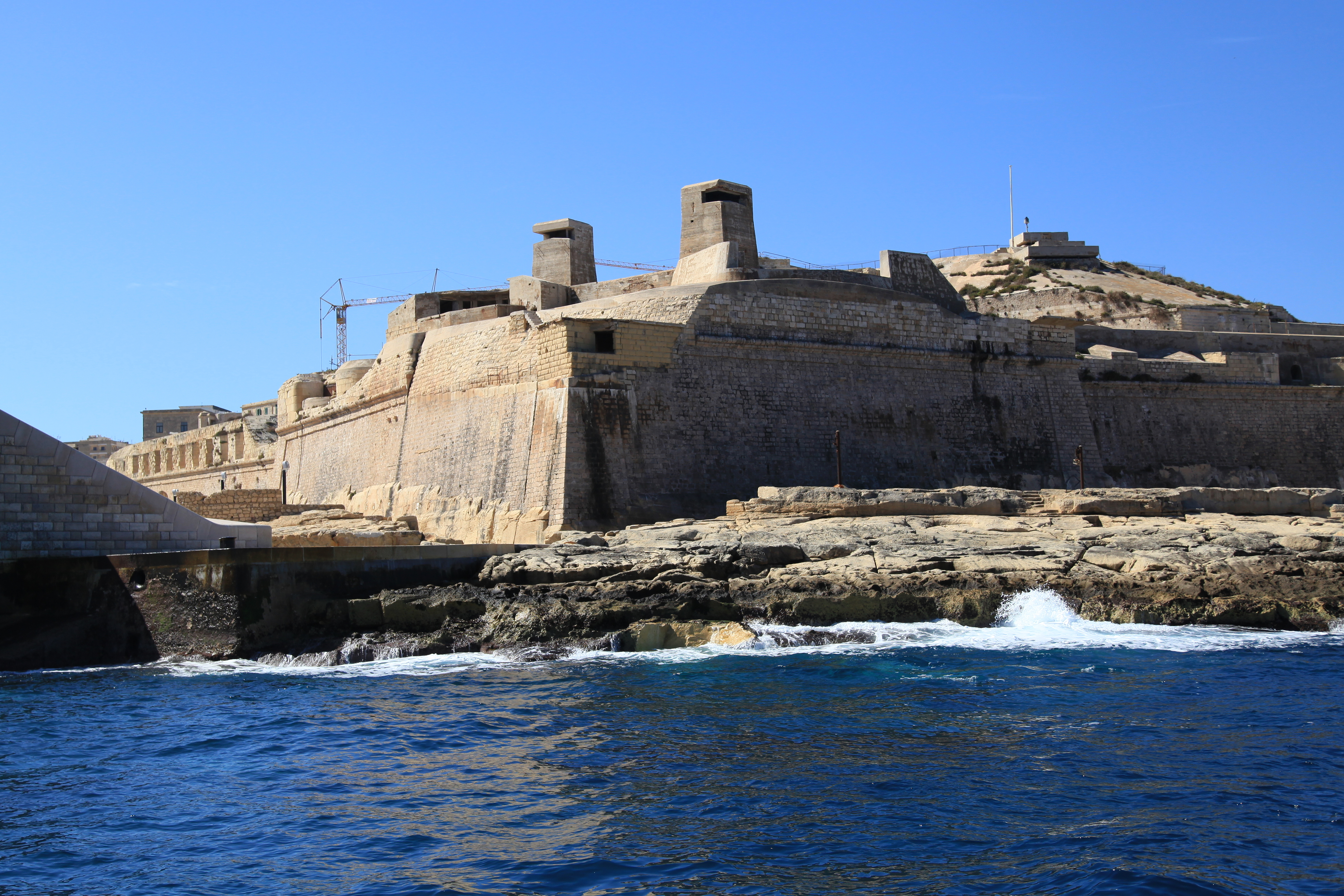
Abercromby is buried in St. John's Bastion within Fort Saint Elmo, Valletta, Malta. It is also known as Abercrombie's Bastion in his honour.

During the action of the battle Abercromby was struck by a musket-ball in the thigh; but not until the battle had been won and he saw the enemy retreating did he allow himself to be relieved of command so he could receive medical aid. He was eventually borne from the field in a hammock, cheered by the blessings of the soldiers as he passed, and conveyed on board the flagship HMS Foudroyant which was moored in the harbour. The ball could not be extracted; mortification ensued, and seven days later, on 28 March 1801, he died.

Abercromby's old friend and commander, the Duke of York, paid tribute to Abercromby's memory in general orders:

"His steady observance of discipline, his ever-watchful attention to the health and wants of his troops, the persevering and unconquerable spirit which marked his military career, the splendour of his actions in the field and the heroism of his death, are worthy the imitation of all who desire, like him, a life of heroism and a death of glory."

— Prince Frederick, Duke of York on Abercromby

He was buried on St John's Bastion within Fort Saint Elmo in Valletta, Malta. The British military renamed it Abercrombie's Bastion in his honour. The adjacent curtain wall linking this bastion to the fortifications of Valletta, originally called Santa Ubaldesca Curtain, was also renamed Abercrombie's Curtain.

== Recognition ==
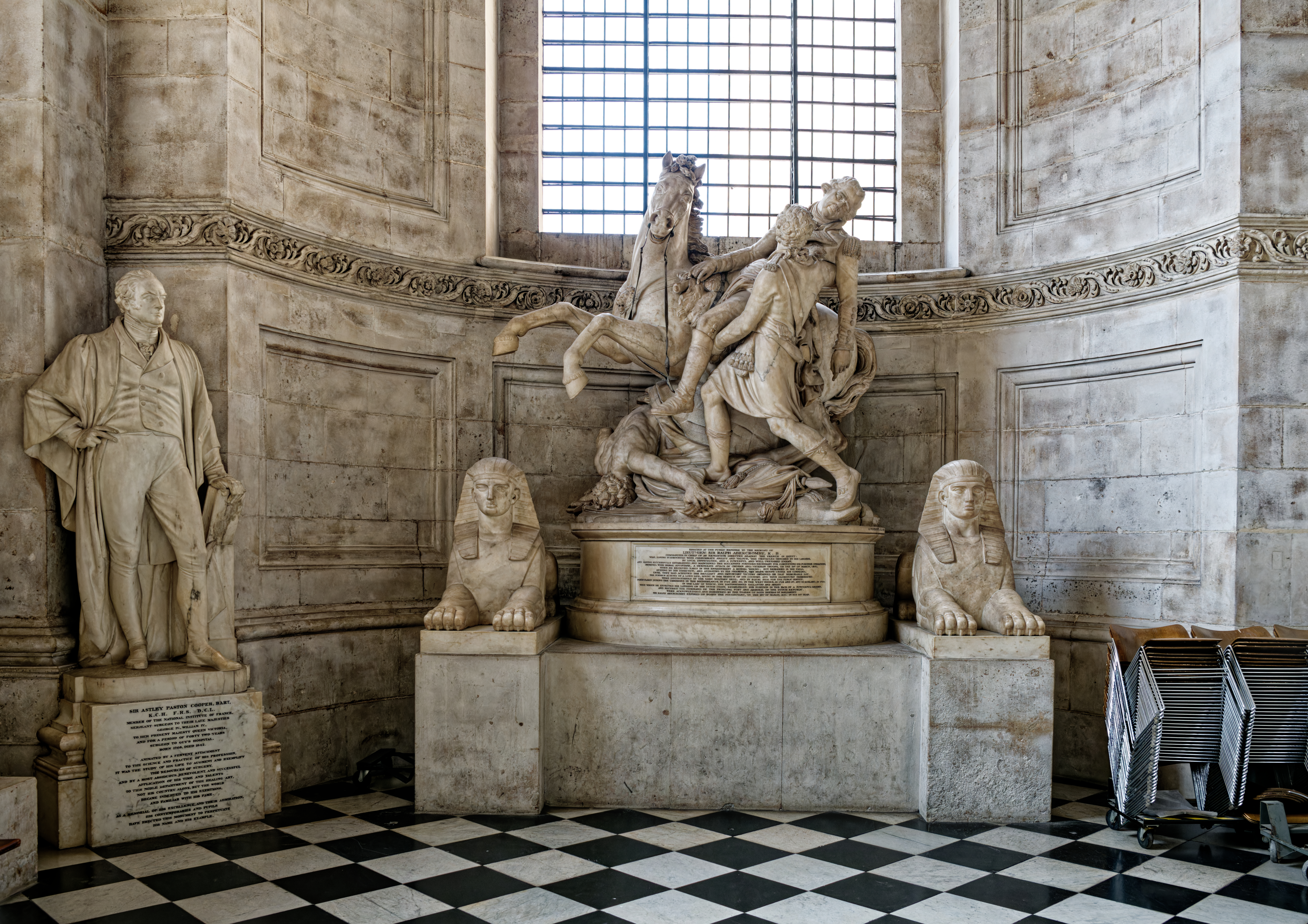
Monument at St Paul's Cathedral

By a vote of the House of Commons, a monument was erected in Abercromby's honour in St Paul's Cathedral in London. His widow was created Baroness Abercromby of Tullibody and Aboukir Bay, and a pension of £2,000 a year was settled on her and her two successors in the title.

Abercromby Place in Edinburgh's New Town and Abercromby Square in Liverpool are named in his honour. Abercromby Street in Port of Spain, Trinidad and Tobago is also named after him.

== Family ==
On 17 November 1767 Abercromby married Mary Anne, daughter of John Menzies and Ann, daughter of Patrick Campbell. They had seven children. Of four sons, all four entered Parliament, and two saw military service.

- Hon. Anne Abercromby (born 21 September 1768 and died October 1832) married Donald Cameron, 22nd Chief of Clan Cameron. They had two sons, and two daughters.
- Hon. Mary Abercromby (born 19 August 1773 and died 26 April 1825)
- Hon. Catherine Abercromby (born 4 December 1780 and died 1841), married on 31 December 1811 to Thomas Buchanan of Powis (d. 1842) Superintendent of Marines at Bombay. They had one son.
- George Abercromby, 2nd Baron Abercromby (1770–1843)
- General Hon. Sir John Abercromby (1772–1817)
- James Abercromby, 1st Baron Dunfermline (1776–1858)
- Lt.-Col. Hon. Alexander Abercromby (1784–1853)

Coat of arms of Ralph Abercromby
Notes Supporters granted 30 January 1798 Crest A bee volant proper Escutcheon Argent a chevron indented Gules between three boars’ heads erased Azure armed Or and langued Sable in the middle chief point a crescent Vert. Supporters On either side, a greyhound per fess Argent and Or collar and line Gules charged on the shoulder with a thistle proper. Motto Vive Ut Vivas

== Popular culture ==
Numerous works have been written about Abercromby. A public house in central Manchester, the "Sir Ralph Abercromby", is named after him. There is also a primary school and pub in Tullibody. There is also another 'General Abercrombie' pub with his portrait by John Hoppner as the sign off of the Blackfriars Bridge Road in London.

Three ships have been named HMS Abercrombie after the general but using the variant spelling of his name.

The ballad song "The Banks of the Nile", perhaps most notably recorded by Sandy Denny and Fotheringay, refers to Sir Ralph Abercrombie's campaign in Egypt.

== Notes ==
=== Primary sources ===
- Abercromby, James (1861), Lieutenant-General Sir Ralph Abercromby, KB, 1793–1801
- "Archival material relating to Ralph Abercromby". UK National Archives.
- Cokayne, G.E.; et al. (2000), The Complete Peerage of England, Scotland, Ireland, Great Britain and the United Kingdom, Extant, Extinct or Dormant, vol. I (reprint in 6 volumes ed.), Gloucester, U.K.: Alan Sutton Publishing, p. 12
- "Orderly Book of the 66th (Berkshire) Regiment of Foot, 16 February 1796–10 October 1796". Collections at the Library of Congress.
- Pine, L.G. (1972), The New Extinct Peerage 1884–1971: Containing Extinct, Abeyant, Dormant and Suspended Peerages With Genealogies and Arms, London: Heraldry Today, p. 1
- Portraits of Ralph Abercromby at the National Portrait Gallery, London

=== Secondary sources ===
- Alonso, María M., "Chapter XIV – Abercromby's Siege", The Eighteenth Century Caribbean & The British Attack on Puerto Rico in 1797, archived from the original on 30 June 2006
- Carrión, Arturo Morales, Historia del Pueblo de Puerto Rico (in Spanish)
- Divall, Carole. General Sir Ralph Abercromby and the French Revolutionary Wars 1792–1801. (Barnsley: Pen & Sword Military, 2019). ISBN 978-1526741462
- Howard, Martin R. Death Before Glory: The British Soldier in the West Indies in the French Revolutionary and Napoleonic Wars, 1793–1815. (Barnsley: Pen & Sword Military, 2015). ISBN 978-1781593417
- "Sir Ralph Abercromby", Encyclopædia Britannica, 3 October 2023
- "Abercromby, Sir Ralph". Dictionary of Irish Biography (online ed.). Royal Irish Academy. October 2009. doi:10.3318/dib.000009.v1.

Parliament of Great Britain
Preceded by James Abercromby (until 1768)	Member of Parliament for Clackmannanshire; 1774–1780	Succeeded by Charles Allan Cathcart (from 1784)
Preceded by Burnet Abercromby (until 1790)	Member of Parliament for Clackmannanshire; 1796–1798	Succeeded by Sir Robert Abercromby
Political offices
Preceded by José Maria Chacón	Governor of Trinidad; February 1797	Succeeded by Sir Thomas Picton
Military offices
New regiment	Colonel of the 103rd Regiment of Foot (King's Irish Infantry); 1781–1784	Disbanded
Preceded by Hon. Philip Sherard	Colonel of the 69th (South Lincolnshire) Regiment of Foot; 1790–1792	Succeeded by Henry Watson Powell
Preceded by Lancelot Baugh	Colonel of the 6th (1st Warwickshire) Regiment of Foot; 1792–1795	Succeeded by The Duke of Gloucester and Edinburgh
Preceded by Charles Grey	Colonel of the 7th (The Princess Royal's) Dragoon Guards; 1795–1796	Succeeded by Sir William Medows
Preceded by Sir Charles Grey	Commander-in-Chief, Windward and Leeward Islands; 1795–1797	Succeeded by Charles Leigh
Preceded by The Earl of Eglinton	Colonel of the 2nd (Royal North British) Regiment of Dragoons; 1796–1801	Succeeded by David Dundas
Preceded by The Earl of Carhampton	Commander-in-Chief, Ireland; 1798	Succeeded by Viscount Lake
Preceded by Studholme Hodgson	Governor of Carlisle; 1798–1801	Succeeded by David Dundas
Honorary titles
Preceded by The Lord Cathcart	Lord Lieutenant of Clackmannanshire; 1798–1801	Succeeded by The Lord Cathcart
