= 103rd Regiment of Foot (1794) =

- Active: 1794–1795
- Country: Kingdom of Great Britain
- Branch: British Army
- Type: Line Infantry
- Role: Infantry
- Size: One battalion

The 103rd Regiment of Foot was a British Army regiment raised in Bristol in May 1794. The regiment was raised by Lieutenant-Colonel William Dyott. Initially known as the Loyal Bristol Regiment, it was renumbered as the 103rd Regiment of Foot later that year but disbanded the following year when personnel were transferred to the 4th Regiment of Foot and the 7th Regiment of Foot.
