= 103rd Regiment =

In military terms, 103rd Regiment may refer to:

== Infantry regiments ==
- 103rd Regiment of Foot (disambiguation), several units of the British Army
- 103rd Regiment (Calgary Rifles), a unit of the Canadian non-permanent militia
- 103rd Indiana Infantry Regiment, a unit of the Union Army
- 103rd Ohio Infantry Regiment, a unit of the Union Army
- 103rd Infantry Regiment (United States)

== Other regiments ==
- 103rd Armor Regiment, a unit of the Pennsylvania National Guard
- 103rd Cavalry Regiment, a former unit of the Pennsylvania National Guard
- 103rd Field Artillery Regiment, a unit of the US Army
- 103rd (Lancashire Artillery Volunteers) Regiment Royal Artillery

== See also ==
- 103rd Division (disambiguation)
