= 103rd Street =

103rd Street may refer to:

== In New York ==
- 103rd Street station (IRT Broadway–Seventh Avenue Line), in Manhattan; serving the 1 train
- 103rd Street station (IND Eighth Avenue Line), in Manhattan; serving the A, B, and C trains
- 103rd Street station (IRT Lexington Avenue Line), in Manhattan; serving the 4, 6, and <6> trains
- 103rd Street–Corona Plaza station, on the IRT Flushing Line in Queens; serving the 7 train

== In Chicago ==
- 103rd Street/Beverly Hills station, on the Rock Island District Beverly branch
- 103rd Street/Washington Heights station, on the Rock Island District main line
- 103rd Street/Rosemoor station, on the Metra Electric District
- 103rd station, a planned Chicago "L" station

== Elsewhere ==
- 103rd Street/Watts Towers station, in Los Angeles
