= 103rd Division (1st Formation) (People's Republic of China) =

103rd Division (1948–51)
- Active: 1948.10 - 1951.2
- Country: People's Republic of China
- Branch: People's Liberation Army
- Type: Division
- Role: Infantry
- Part of: 35th Corps
- Engagements: Chinese Civil War

The 103rd Division(Chinese: 第103师) was created in October 1948 basing on defected 155th Reorganized Brigade of 96th Reorganized Corps, Republic of China Army.

The division was a part of PLA 35th Corps.

In February 1949 the division absorbed 47th Division of Luzhongnan Column of the People's Liberation Army. 3 regiments from the original 161st Reorganized Brigade were merged as 308th Regiment, and 307th and 309th Regiments were reorganized from 139th and 140th Regiments from 47th Division, respectively.

In April 1949 the division took part in the Nanjing Campaign.

From January 16, 1950 the division was acting as Taizhou Military Sub-district.

On February 15, 1951 the division was disbanded.

As of its disbandment the division was composed of:

- 307th Regiment;
- 308th Regiment;
- 309th Regiment.
