= Louis de Canchy de Lerole =

French governor of Montreal and Grenada

Governor of Montreal
- In office 1668–1668
- Preceded by: Zacharie Dupuy
- Succeeded by: Pierre La Motte

Governor of Grenada
- In office 1671–1674
- Preceded by: Monsieur de Vincent
- Succeeded by: Pierre de Sainte-Marthe de Lalande
- Military Career
- Allegiance: French colonial empire
- Branch: French Army
- Rank: Lieutenant
- Unit: Carignan-Salières Regiment

Louis de Canchy de Lerole was the governor of Montreal in 1668 and served as the governor of French Grenada from 1671 to 1674. He also served as an officer in New France (Quebec), and fought against the indigenous Mohawk people. He was made a Lieutenant of the Carignan-Salières Regiment of Quebec, and there is a street in Quebec named in his honour.
