= List of colonial governors and administrators of Grenada =

This is a list of Viceroys/Colonial Governors of Grenada from the establishment of French rule in 1649 until its independence from the United Kingdom in 1974. Following independence, the viceroy of Grenada ceased to represent the British monarch and British government, and ceased to be a British person, instead the new vice regal office, renamed to Governor-General of Grenada represented (and to this day, represents) the Monarch of Grenada, and the person holding the office must be a Grenadian citizen.

== French governors of Grenada (1649–1762) ==
French rule began in Grenada in 1649.

- Jean Le Comte, 1649-1654
- Du Parquet, 1651 (appointed by the King, but was only “governor in name”)
- Louis Cacqueuray de Valminière, 1654-1658
- Jean Francois Dubuc, 1658 (or 1658-1660)
- Jean Faudoas de Cérillac, 1658-1662 (officially until 1664)
- Jean Faudoas de Cérillac the younger, 1662-1664 (Unofficial, appointed by his father who retired in 1662).
- Monsieur Vincent ? 1664-1670 (Uncertain)
- Louis de Canchy de Lerole, 1671-1674
- Pierre de Sainte-Marthe de Lalande, 1675-1679
- Jacques de Chambly, 1679-1680
- Nicolas de Gabaret, 1680-1689
- Louis Ancelin de Gemostat, 1690-1695
- Jean-Léon Fournier de Carlos de Pradine 1695-1696 (Interim, first time)
- Monsiuer De Bellair de Saint-Aignan, 1696-1700
- Joseph de Bouloc, 1701-1708
- Laurent de Valernod, 1708-1710
- Guillaume-Emmanuel-Théodore de Maupeou, Comte de L’Estrange, 1711-1716
- Jean-Michel de Lépinay, 1717-3 January 1721
- Jean Balthazard du Houx, 1721-1722
- Bonnaventure-François de Boisfermé, 1 December 1722 – 11 December 1722 (Did not take office)
- Robert Giraud du Poyet, 1723-1727
- Charles de Brunier, Marquis de Larnage, 1727-1734
- Jean-Louis Fournier de Charles de Pradine, 1734-1748 (second time)
- Robert-Philippe Longvilliers de Poincy, 1748-1757
- Pierre-Claude Bonvoust d'Aulnay de Prulay, 1757-1762

== British governors of Grenada (1762–1802) ==
In 1763, the Treaty of Paris ceded Grenada to the United Kingdom.

- George Scott, 1762–1764
- Robert Melville, 1764, acting, first time
- Ulysses FitzMaurice, 1764–1770, first time
- Robert Melville, 1770–1771, second time
- Ulysses FitzMaurice, 1771, second time
- William Leyborne Leyborne, 1771–1775
- William Young, 1776
- The Lord Macartney, 1776–1779
- Jean-François, comte de Durat, 1779–1783, Governor-General, (French occupation)
- Jean André De La Borie 1782-1784, Private Commander and Interim Governor in 1784 (French occupation)
- Edward Mathew, 1784–1785
- William Lucas, 1785–1787, acting
- Samuel Williams, 1787–1788, acting, first time
- James Campbell, 1788–1789, acting
- Samuel Williams, 1789–1792, acting, second time
- Ninian Home, 17 November 1792 – 1795
- Kenneth Francis Mackenzie, 1795, acting
- Samuel Mitchell, 1795–1796, acting
- Alexander Houstoun, 1796–1797
- Charles Green, 30 September 1797 – 1801
- Samuel Dent, 1801–1802, acting

== Lieutenant governors of Grenada (1802–1882) ==
In 1802, the Governor of Grenada was replaced by a lieutenant governor, subordinate to the Governor of Barbados.

- George Vere Hobart, 1802–5 November 1802
- Thomas Hislop, 1803–1804
- William Douglas MacLean Clephane, 1803
- Frederick Maitland, 29 March 1805 – 1811
- Abraham Charles Adye, 1811–1812
- George Robert Ainslie, 1812–1813
- Charles Shipley, 1813–1815, acting
- George Paterson, 1815–1816, acting, first time
- Phineas Riall, 1816–1823
- George Paterson, 1823–1826, acting, second time
- James Campbell, 1826–1833

In 1833, Grenada was incorporated into the British Windward Islands along with Barbados, St. Lucia, Saint Vincent, and the Grenadines. The Governor of Barbados retained overall responsibility for Grenada with the Lieutenant Governor of Grenada as his subordinate.

- George Middlemore, 1833–1835
- John Hastings Mair, 1835–1836
- Carlo Joseph Doyle, 1836–1846
- Ker Baillie Hamilton, 1846–1853
- Robert William Keate, 1853–1857
- Cornelius Hendricksen Kortright, 1857–1864
- Robert Miller Mundy, 1864–1871
- Sanford Freeling, 1871–1875
- Cyril Clerke Graham, 1875–1877
- Robert William Harley, 1877–1882

== Administrators of Grenada (1882–1967) ==
In 1882, the role of the Lieutenant Governor of Grenada was replaced by that of an administrator. The administrator remained subordinate to the Governor of Barbados. In 1885, Barbados left the administrative control of the Windward Islands. A new Governor of the Windward Islands was appointed, with his seat in Grenada. The Administrator of Grenada remained a subordinate position concerned with matters local to Grenada itself.

- Irwin Charles Maling, 1882, first time
- Roger Tuckfield Goldsworthy, 1882–1883
- Edward Laborde, 1883–1886, first time
- Irwin Charles Maling, 1886–1887, second time
- Henry Rawlins Pipon Schooles, 1887–1888
- John Elliott, Jun 1888 – Dec 1888
- Robert Baxter Llewelyn, Dec 1888 – Jan 1889, first time
- Edward Laborde, Jan 1889 – Nov 1889, second time
- Robert Baxter Llewelyn, Nov 1889 – Sep 1890, second time
- Lawrence Riky Fyfe, Sep 1890 – Nov 1890
- Edward Rawle Drayton, 1890–1915
- Herbert Ferguson, 1915–1930
- Hilary Rudolph Robert Blood, 1930–1935
- William Leslie Heape, 1935–1940
- Charles Henry Vincent Talbot, 1940–1942
- George Conrad Green, 1942–1951
- Wallace MacMillan, 1951–1957
- James Monteith Lloyd, 1957–1962

Between 1958 and 1962, Grenada was part of the short-lived Federation of the West Indies.

- Lionel Achille Pinard, 1962–1964
- Ian Turbott, 1964–1967

== Governors of Grenada (1967–1974) ==
On 3 March 1967, Grenada became an Associated State of the United Kingdom, responsible for its own internal affairs. A governor was again appointed as the United Kingdom's official representative.

- Ian Turbott, 1967–1968
- Dame Hilda Bynoe, 1968 – 21 January 1974
- Sir Leo de Gale, 24 January 1974 – 7 February 1974, acting

On 7 February 1974, Grenada achieved independence from Great Britain. After independence, the vice regal office in Grenada became the Governor-General of Grenada.
