= William Leybourne =

William Leybourne may refer to:

- William de Leybourne (1250–1309), English Knight and military commander
- William Leybourne Leybourne (1744–1775), British colonial governor

== See also ==
- William Leybourn (1626–1716), English mathematician and land surveyor, printer, and bookseller
