= William Leyborne Leyborne =

British colonial administrator (died 1775)

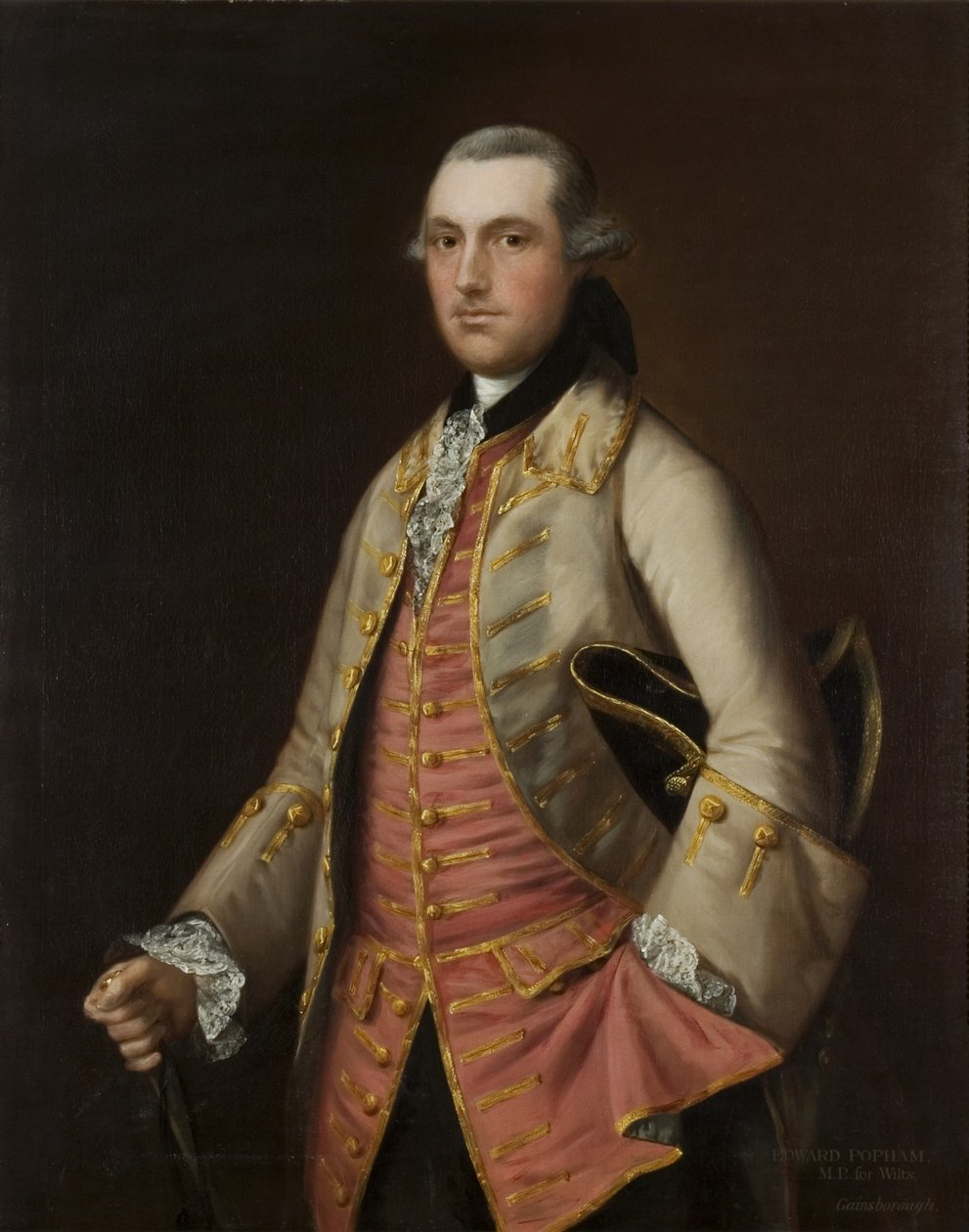
- Portrait by Thomas Gainsborough, c. 1763

Governor of Grenada
- In office 2 March 1771 – 16 Apr 1775

Personal details
- Born: 1736/1744 England
- Died: 16 April 1775
- Parent: Edward Taylor (father)
- Nickname: William Leyborne

William Leyborne Leyborne (born William Leyborne Taylor; c. 1736/1744 — 16 April 1775) was a British colonial administrator who served as the governor of Grenada from 1771 to 1775.

== Early life ==
Leyborne was born William Leyborne Taylor, son of Edward Taylor and Ann Leyborne, in c. 1736/1744. Ann was the daughter of Anthony Leyborne. William later took the name Leyborne in place of Taylor, thus becoming William Leyborne Leyborne. On 19 May 1763 he married Ann Popham, daughter of Edward Popham, Esq. MP, of Littlecote Wiltshire.

When his brother-in-law Francis Popham, Edward's heir, died childless in 1779, the estates were inherited by his widow Dorothy Popham (nee Hutton) and on her death in 1797, they went to another Francis Popham (1757 - 1804), the "reputed son" of Francis of Littlecote. On his death in 1804, William Leyborne Leyborne's eldest son Edward William Leyborne inherited the estates and was obliged to add the name Popham to his own. Edward William Leyborne Popham became General Popham (1764 – 1843) of Littlecote and later High Sheriff of Wiltshire.

== Career ==
Brigadier-General Leyborne was appointed on 2 March 1771 Captain-General and Governor-in-Chief of his Majesty’s islands of Grenada, the Grenadines, St. Vincent and Tobago by King George III, taking over the position from Robert Melvill.

As Governor of Grenada he was granted expenses from 1 Nov 1771 to 16 Apr 1775.

Just ten years previously the British had gained control of the Grenadines (south of St. Vincent) and placed them also under the charge of Grenada when raiding privateers began presenting a continuing threat and forcing the new Governor-in-Chief to protest to London that St. Vincent should have a separate governor and appointed gentleman planter Valentine Morris. Dominica planters also pushed for a separate government in this case because of its distance from Grenada retarding its economic progress

This was a time when the Windward Islands were in the midst of British absenteeism in which any developing legislatures would be composed of people without any major landed investment in the islands, yet consisted of a large French Catholic community who themselves (though having freely signed a petition of allegiance to the King) owned several major estates, and whose own loyalty to the Crown was considered questionable by its British residents. Making the job of finding proper persons to make a Council an impossible problem to solve for Governor Leyborne.

Shortly after, and just four years before the French recaptured Grenada, Leyborne died on 16 April 1775 in St. Vincent, aged 39 years, and Lt. William Young, Governor of Tobago, was appointed to act as Governor.

Amongst the many men who held important offices in the island of St Vincent, in the cemetery surrounding the cathedral of St. George, situated in Kingstown, there was a monument (which was by 1912 much affected by the rains and heat as to almost obliterate the inscription) stood prominently to the memory of the late Excellency William Leyborne.

Government offices
Preceded by William Young	Governor of Grenada; 2 March 1771–16 April 1775	Succeeded by Robert Melvill
