= Charles Mackenzie (diplomat) =

Scottish diplomat, writer and journalist

Charles Kenneth Mackenzie (1788–1862) was a Scottish diplomat, writer and journalist.

== Life ==
He was the eldest son of Kenneth Francis Mackenzie, who had plantation interests in the West Indies, and at the time of Fedon's Rebellion acted as president of the council in Grenada; there are sources stating that Charles Mackenzie would have been classified as a Negro in the USA. Colin Mackenzie was his brother.

He was educated at the University of Edinburgh, where he befriended James Cowles Prichard, and served in the Peninsular War. He was elected a Fellow of the Royal Society in 1815.He then edited a conservative evening paper, Albion.

Subsequently, he was a diplomat in Mexico, Haiti and Cuba; in Haiti at least he did intelligence work. Returning to England, he wrote for The Metropolitan Magazine, under the editorship of Cyrus Redding.

During the latter part of his life he lived mostly in the United States, where he died on 6 July 1862 during a fire at the Rainbow Hotel on Beekman Street in New York City.

Mackenzie collected plants for August Grisebach and William Jackson Hooker.

== Works ==
Mackenzie published Notes on Haiti in two volumes (1830), based on his period 1826–7 as British consul there, and including both economic statistics and social observations. Parts were republished shortly by John Brown Russwurm, to publicise the Haitian Revolution.

- Mackenzie, Charles. Notes on Haïti, made during a residence in that Republic, Vol. 1, London, Henry Colburn and Richard Bentley, 1830. Manioc
- Mackenzie, Charles. Notes on Haïti, made during a residence in that Republic, Vol. 2, London, Henry Colburn and Richard Bentley, 1830. Manioc

Mackenzie also wrote for the Edinburgh Review, Quarterly Review, and Encyclopædia Britannica.
