= Governor Morris (disambiguation) =

Gouverneur Morris (1752–1816) was an American statesman.

Governor Morris may also refer to:

- Lewis Morris (governor) (1671–1746), 8th colonial governor of New Jersey
- Luzon B. Morris (1827–1895), 55th governor of Connecticut
- Robert Hunter Morris (1700–1764), governor of Colonial Pennsylvania
- Valentine Morris (1727–1789), governor of St. Vincent from 1772 to 1779
