= Governor of Montreal =

The governor of Montreal was the highest position in Montreal in the 17th century and the 18th century. Prior to the establishment of the 1663 Sovereign Council, the governor of Montreal was appointed by the Société Notre-Dame de Montréal. The governor had responsibilities over both military and civil affairs in Montreal.

== List of governors of Montreal ==
This is a list of governors of Montreal.

Governor	Term	Sovereign
Paul de Chomedey de Maisonneuve	1642–1669	Louis XIV
Louis d'Ailleboust de Coulonge	1645-1647 (acting)	Louis XIV
Charles-Joseph d'Ailleboust des Musseaux	1651-1653 (acting)	Louis XIV
Raphaël-Lambert Closse	1655-1657 (acting)	Louis XIV
Zacharie Dupuis de Verdun	1662 (acting)	Louis XIV
Étienne Pézard de LaTouche	1664 (acting)	Louis XIV
Zacharie Dupuis de Verdun	1665-1666 (acting)	Louis XIV
Annibal-Alexis or Balthazar de Flotte de La Frédière	1666-1667 (acting)	Louis XIV
Zacharie Dupuy de Verdun	1667-1668 (acting)	Louis XIV
Louis de Canchy de Lerole	1668 (acting)	Louis XIV
Pierre de Lamotte de Saint-Paul	1669–1670	Louis XIV
Michel-Sidrac Dugué de Boisbriand	1670	Louis XIV
François-Marie Perrot de Sainte-Geneviève	1670–1684	Louis XIV
Thomas de Lanouguère	1674-1675 (acting)	Louis XIV
Louis-Hector de Callière	1684–1699	Louis XIV
François Provost	1686–1687	Louis XIV
Philippe de Rigaud de Vaudreuil	1688-1689 (acting)	Louis XIV
Philippe de Rigaud de Vaudreuil	1699–1704	Louis XIV
Claude de Ramezay	1704–1724	Louis XIV
Charles Le Moine, 1st Baron de Longueuil	1724–1729	Louis XV
Jean Bouillet, sieur de la Chassaigne	1729–1733	Louis XV
J.-M.-Josué Berthelot, sieur de Beaucourt	1733–1748	Louis XV
Charles Le Moine, 2nd Baron de Longueuil	1748–1755	Louis XV
François-Pierre Rigaud de Vaudreuil	1757–1760	Louis XV
Thomas Gage	1760–1763	George III
Ralph Burton	1763–1764	George III

== See also ==
- Governor General of New France
- Governor of Acadia
- Governor of Plaisance
- Governor of Louisiana
- Timeline of Montreal history
- History of Montreal
- List of mayors of Montreal
