= Colin Mackenzie (Indian Army officer) =

Scottish Indian Army officer

Colin Mackenzie C.B.
- Colin Mackenzie in Afghan dress by James Sant, c.1842 National Army Museum Sandhurst; Indian Army Memorial Room
- Born: 26 March 1806; London, England, United Kingdom
- Died: 22 October 1881 (aged 75); Edinburgh, Scotland, United Kingdom
- Burial place: Grange Cemetery, Edinburgh
- Military career
- Allegiance: East India Company (1825–1858); United Kingdom (1858–1873)
- Branch: Madras Army
- Rank: Lieutenant-General
- Unit: 48th Madras native infantry
- Commands: 4th Sikh regiment; Ellichpúr division
- Conflicts: See battles Coorg War First Anglo-Afghan War Second Anglo-Sikh War
- Awards: Kábul medal

Lieutenant general Colin Mackenzie, CB (25 March 1806 – 22 October 1881) was a British officer in the Madras Army who was active as a political officer in Afghanistan.

== Early life ==
He was born in London on 25 March 1806, and baptised at St James's Church, Piccadilly, the youngest son but one of Kenneth Francis Mackenzie (died 1831) and his wife, Anne Townsend. His father, who belonged to the Redcastle branch of Mackenzies, was attorney-general of Grenada and briefly governor, and lost a lot during the wars with France and Fédon’s rebellion, 1793–1815. Colin Mackenzie was educated successively at a school in Cumberland, at Dollar Academy, and at Oswestry, and in 1825 was appointed a cadet of infantry on the Madras establishment of the East India Company.

Mackenzie served as adjutant of the 48th Madras native infantry in the Coorg campaign in 1834, during some of which he held the appointment of deputy-assistant quartermaster-general. At the close of the campaign his services were favourably noticed by the brigadier-general commanding the force. In 1836 he accompanied Captain Chads in an expedition to the Straits of Malacca, against pirates; Mackenzie was on board only as a passenger but was commended.

== First Afghan War ==
Lord Auckland as governor-general of India selected him in 1840 for the force then serving in Afghanistán. Mackenzie distinguished himself, first as assistant political agent under George Clerk at Peshawar. He then went to Kabul, where he joined a corps of sappers which had been raised by George Broadfoot, a shipmate of his on his voyage to India. Mackenzie led the advanced guard of Sir Robert Sale's force as far as Gundamack on its march to Jellálabad. He then returned to Kabul, where he commanded the godown fort of Nishán Khán, in which the commissariat of Shuja Shah Durrani's troops was kept; and was in command of this fort when the rising of Afghans at Kábul broke out. On 3 November, in a difficult position, he fought his way out by night.

The following month Mackenzie was present at the conference between the envoy, Sir William Hay Macnaghten and Akbár Khán; he and Eldred Pottinger had tried to dissuade Macnaghten from attending. Macnaghten was taken and shot by Akbár Khán. At the same time Mackenzie and George Lawrence were made prisoner. Later he was freed, and was on the retreat from Kábul, in the course of which he was selected as a hostage. In this position he was deputed by Pottinger to convey letters to the political agent at Jellálabad and to General Sir George Pollock, who had reached that place. Mackenzie was subsequently moved by Akbár Khán with the rest of the hostages and prisoners, over the Hindu Kúsh; but after the arrival of Pollock's force in the vicinity of Kábul, money was paid for their release.

Before returning to India Mackenzie took part with Henry Havelock in the assault on the fort of Istaliff. Mackenzie was refused the Kábul medal and the six months' pay which accompanied it, and it was not until 1853 that, after the intervention of Lord Dalhousie, it was granted to him.

== Later life ==
Mackenzie was subsequently employed on the north-west frontier to raise a Sikh regiment (the 4th), with which he kept the peace of the border during the Second Anglo-Sikh War. He met Lord Dalhousie, who formed a high opinion of him; Mackenzie urged Dalhousie that Peshawar was the gate of India and should not be given up. He was still a regimental captain when, in 1850, he was appointed by Dalhousie brigadier-general in command of the Ellichpúr division of the Hyderabad contingent. Mackenzie had held his new command for some years when a mutiny occurred in one of the cavalry regiments of the contingent, in which he was wounded, in September 1855, on the occasion of the Muharram procession at Bolarum. He returned to England for a time.

Later Mackenzie held the political appointment of agent to the governor-general with the Nawab of Bengal; but was transferred to one of the civil departments of the army as superintendent of army clothing. Some years later, on his claiming a divisional command in his own presidency, it was withheld from him by the commander-in-chief on the ground of the censure which had been passed upon him in the Bolarum case. On that occasion, the governor of Madras, Francis, Lord Napier, and one of the members of council, referred the question to the secretary of state, who declined to interfere.

Mackenzie, who was made C.B. in 1867, finally left India in 1873, and died at Edinburgh on 22 October 1881. He is buried in the Grange Cemetery in south Edinburgh.

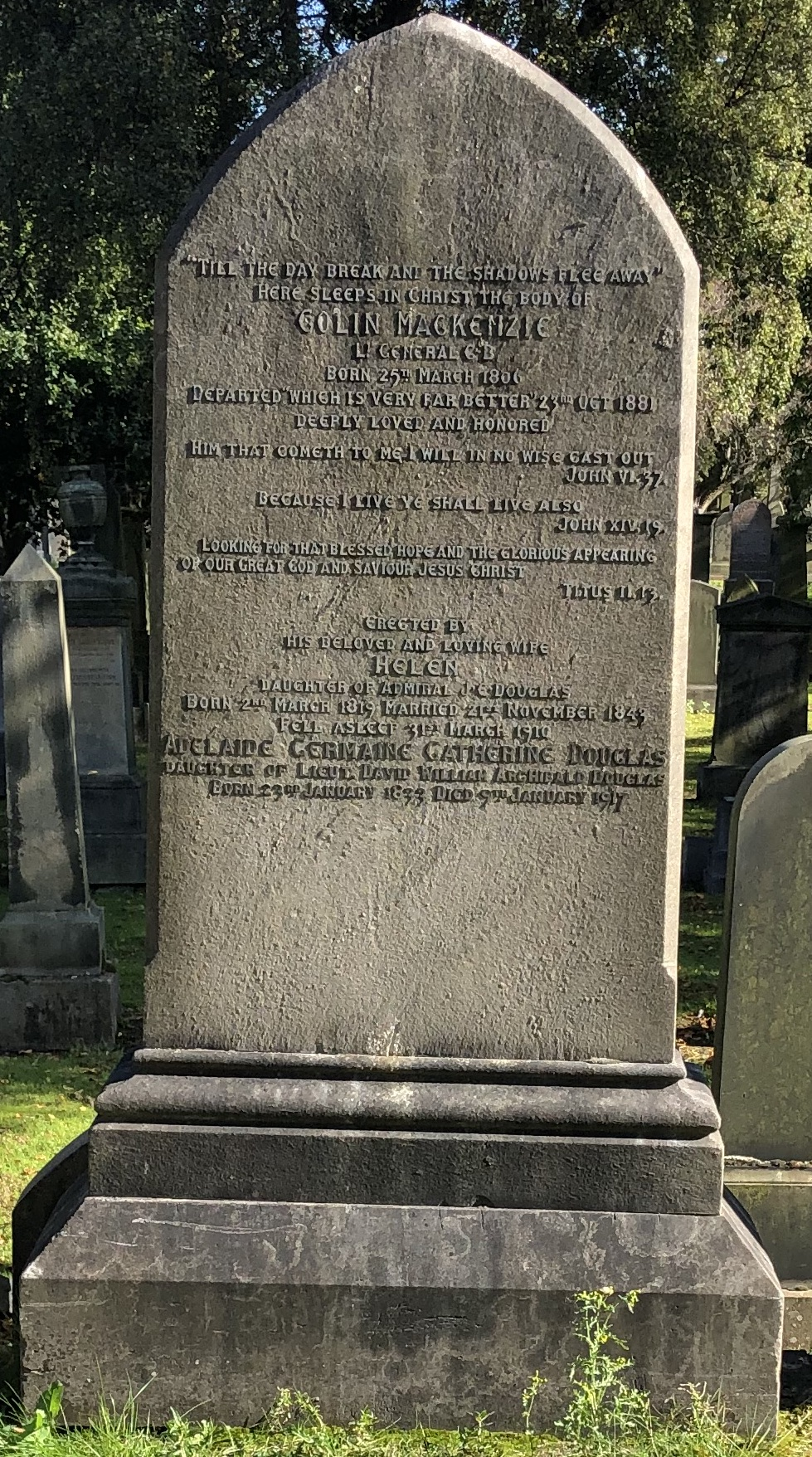
Gravestone of Lt-Gen Colin Mackenzie in the Grange Cemetery, Edinburgh

== Family ==
Mackenzie married first, in May 1832, Adeline, eldest daughter of James Pattle of the Bengal civil service, who died four years afterwards. He married secondly, in 1843, Helen, eldest daughter of Admiral John Erskine Douglas, who survived him, and published several works relating to India, besides the life of her husband. A photogravure portrait of Mackenzie, aged 74, was prefixed to Mrs. Mackenzie's Storms and Sunshine (Edinburgh, 1884, 2 vols.).
