= List of colonial governors and administrators of Saint Vincent =

This is a list of viceroys in Saint Vincent and the Grenadines from British settlement in 1763 until it gained independence from the United Kingdom in 1979.

== Lieutenant governors of Saint Vincent (1763–1776) ==
- George Maddison, 1763–1764
- Joseph Higginson, 1764–1766
- Lauchlin McLean, 1766
- Ulysses FitzMaurice, 1766–1772
- Valentine Morris, 1772–1776

== Governors of Saint Vincent (1776–1833) ==
- Valentine Morris, 1776–1779, continued
- Charles-Marie de Trolong du Rumain, 1779 (French occupation)
- Antoine Dumontet, 1779–1780 (French occupation)
- Philibert François Rouxel de Blanchelande 1780–1781 (French occupation)
- Jean-Baptiste Vigoureux Duplessis, 1781–1782 (French occupation)
- Pierre-Jean-François de Feydeau, March 1782–Septembre 1782, interim (French occupation)
- Édouard Hilaire Louis de Tilly, 1782–1 January 1784 (French occupation)
- Edmund Lincoln, 1783–1787
- James Seton, 1787–1798
- William Bentinck, 1798–1799
- Drewry Ottley (acting), 1799-1802
- Henry William Bentinck, 1802–1806
- Robert Paul (1st time)(acting) 1805–1806
- George Beckwith, 1806–1808
- Robert Paul (2nd time)(acting) 1807
- Charles Brisbane, 1808–1829
- Robert Paul (3rd time)(acting) 1808–1809
- Robert Paul (4th time)(acting) 1810–1812
- Robert Paul (5th time)(acting) 1816–1817
- William John Struth, 1829–1831, acting
- Sir George Hill, 2nd Baronet 1831–1833

== Lieutenant governors of Saint Vincent (1833–1886) ==
In 1833, Saint Vincent and the Grenadines became part of the British Windward Islands. A lieutenant governor was appointing in Saint Vincent, subordinate to the Governor of Barbados (to 1885) or the Governor of the Windward Islands (from 1885).

- George Tyler, 1833–1842
- Richard Doherty, 1842–1845
- John Campbell, 1845–1853
- Richard Graves MacDonnell, 1853–1854
- Edward John Eyre, 1854–1861
- Anthony Musgrave, 1861–1864
- George Berkeley 1864–1871
- William Hepburn Rennie, 1871–1875
- George Dundas, 1875–1880
- Augustus Frederick Gore, 1880–1886

== Administrators of Saint Vincent (1886–1969) ==
- Robert Baxter Llewelyn, 1886–1889
- Irwin Charles Maling, 1889–1893
- John Hartley Sandwith, 1893–1895
- Harry Langhorne Thompson, 1895–1901
- Edward John Cameron, 1901–1909
- Charles Gideon Murray, 1909–1915
- Reginald Popham Lobb, 1915–1923
- Robert Walter, 1923–1929
- Herbert Walter Peebles, 1929–1933
- Arthur Francis Grimble, 1933–1936
- Arthur Alban Wright, 1936–1938
- William Bain Gray, 1938–1941
- Alexander Elder Beattie, 1941–1944
- Ronald Herbert Garvey, 1944–1948
- Walter Coutts, 1948–1955
- Alexander Falconer Giles, 1955–1961
- Samuel Horatio Graham, 1961–1966
- John Lionel Chapman, 1966–1967
- Hywel George, 1967–27 October 1969

== Governors of Saint Vincent and the Grenadines (1969–1979) ==
On 27 October 1969, Saint Vincent and the Grenadines became an associated state of the United Kingdom, responsible for its own internal affairs.

- Hywel George, 27 October 1969–27 October 1970, continued
- Rupert Godfrey John, 27 October 1970 – 1976
- Sidney Gun-Munro, 1976–27 October 1979

On 27 October 1979, Saint Vincent and the Grenadines gained independence from the United Kingdom. For a list of viceroys after independence, see the list of governors-general, starting with Sidney Gun-Munro continuing in post.

== See also ==
- History of Saint Vincent and the Grenadines
