= Thomas de Lanouguère =

Canadian politician

Thomas de Lanouguère (French pronunciation: [tɔma də lanuɡɛʁ]; 1644 – May 1678) was a soldier, seigneur and administrator in New France. He was acting governor of Montreal in 1674. His descendants adopted the surnames Lanaudière, Tarieu de Lanaudière and Tarieu de La Pérade.

The son of Jean de Lanouguère and Jeanne de Samalins, he was born in Mirande, Gascony, France and arrived in New France as an ensign in the Carignan-Salières Regiment and took part in an expedition against the Iroquois. When the company was disbanded, Lanouguère remained in Canada and, in 1670, purchased land along the Sainte-Anne River, now part of the parish of Sainte-Anne-de-la-Pérade. In 1672, he married Marguerite-Renée, the daughter of Pierre Denys de la Ronde. In the same year, he was named lieutenant for the guards of Governor Frontenac. The following year, he was named interim commandant at Montreal and captain of Frontenac's guards at Quebec City. Lanouguère died suddenly at Quebec City five years later.

In 1708, his widow married Jacques-Alexis de Fleury Deschambault, lieutenant-general of the royal jurisdiction of Montreal. His son Pierre-Thomas Tarieu de La Pérade inherited the seigneury and later married Madeleine de Verchères, famous for thwarting an Iroquois raid on Fort Verchères.

The rue De Lanaudière in Quebec city takes its name from his family.
