= Pierre-Claude Bonvoust d'Aulnay de Prulay =

French governor of Grenada (1691-1785)

Governor of Grenada
- In office 1757–1762
- Preceded by: Robert-Philippe Longvilliers de Poincy
- Succeeded by: George Scott (British take over of Grenada)

Personal details
- Born: 1691
- Died: 1785 (aged 93–94)

Pierre-Claude Bonvoust d'Aulnay de Prulay (1691–1785) was the last French governor of Grenada from 1757 to the 4th March 1762, he facilitated the peaceful handover of Grenada during the Seven Years’ War. De Prulay had a military career in Martinique from 1719-1729 before serving as an army Major in Grenada in 1735. De Prulay then was the Kings Lieutenant of Grenada (Lieutenant De Roi À La Grenade) in 1751, before becoming Governor, he requested a position in the marine guard for his son in 1751. His letters were addressed to the secretariat of the navy in Martinique and Governor of the French Antilles Maximin de Bompart.
