= Samuel Mitchell (governor) =

Acting Governor of Grenada from 1795 to 1796

Governor of Grenada
- In office 1795–1796
- Preceded by: Kenneth Mackenzie
- Succeeded by: Alexander Houstoun

Personal details
- Born: 5 October 1750 Bucklersbury, City of London, England
- Died: 4 February 1805 (aged 54) Topsham, Devon UK
- Citizenship: British
- Spouse: Mary Floud (married 7th September 1802-1805)
- Domestic partner: Victoire (1777-1796)
- Children: 4
- Relatives: Samuel Chandler (grandfather); William Stewart Mitchell D’Urban (grandson)
- Occupation: Governor of Grenada

Samuel Mitchell (5 October 1750 – 4 February 1805) was the interim governor of Grenada during the Fédon revolt (1795–1796), he succeeded Kenneth Mackenzie who was also an interim governor. Samuel Mitchell was also a slave and land owner and was a part of the local government and militia.

== Life ==
Samuel Mitchell was born in 1750 in Bucklersbury in London to Thomas Mitchell and Elizabeth Chandler (daughter of Rev. Samuel Chandler), he grew up in England before going to Grenada around the year 1765. In 1790 he purchased the Chemin Estate and changes its name to “Hope Vale estate” there is no trace of the plantation as a village was built where the plantation once was. In the same year (1790) became President of the island's council. He returned to England after the revolt as his plantations was ruined. He had two illegitimate children with a slave called Victoire in Grenada, one called John Mitchell (1777–1841) and Frederick Mitchell (1778-). John Mitchell was the patriarch of the Mitchell family which is a large family in the south of Grenada (many Grenadians have relatives who were “Mitchells”). In the UK he married Mary Floud (sister of the Mayor of Exeter Thomas Floud) and had two children, Mary Elizabeth (1803–1892) and Samuel (1806-1806). Mary Elizabeth married James D’Urban, son of Benjamin D’Urban, Mary's son was William Stewart Mitchell D’Urban, who was an English museum curator and naturalist.
