= Vincent (governor) =

French Governor of Grenada

Monsieur de Vincent

Governor of Grenada
- In office November 1664 – 1670
- Preceded by: Jean Faudoas de Cérillac (officially); Jean Faudoas de Cérillac II (unofficially)
- Succeeded by: Louis de Canchy de Lerole

Monsieur de Vincent was the French governor of Grenada from November 1664 to 1670. He was appointed as governor by Prouville de Tracy, a representative of the French West India company (Compagnie des Indes occidentales Françaises) who had acquired the island for 100,000 Livres from governor De Cérillac.

== Governorship ==
As Governor Monsieur de Vincent oversaw the affairs of the French in Grenada as well as the sporadic conflicts between the Kalinago and French. In March 1665 war had broken out between England and France in the Second Anglo-Dutch war and by January the following year Monsieur de Vincent retreated to the mountainous interior of Grenada for safety, fearing an attack from English forces. In August a number of French Grenadian militiamen on the orders of Monsieur De Vincent attacked and occupied the island of Tobago.
