= Action of 10 August 1780 =

1790 naval battle

- Part of the American Revolutionary War
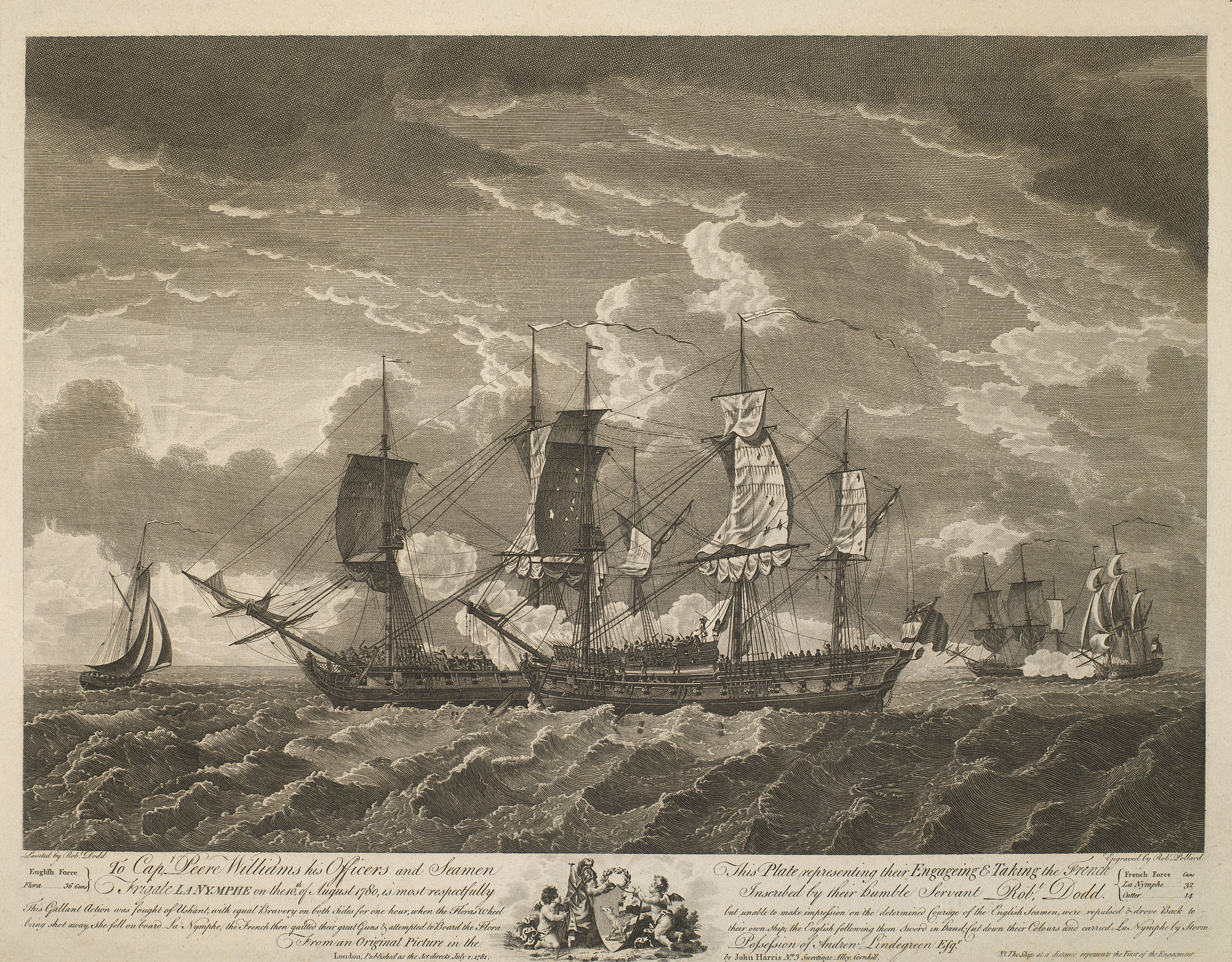
- Naval battle at Ushant, 1780, engraved by Robert Pollard, after Robert Dodd
Date	10 August 1780
Location	Off Ushant
Result	British victory

Belligerents
Great Britain	France

Commanders and leaders
(Kingdom of Great Britain) William Williams	(Kingdom of France) Charles-Marie du Rumain †

Strength
1 frigate 36 gun	1 frigate 32 gun

Casualties and losses
9 killed & 17 wounded	1 frigate captured, 51 killed, 81 wounded 159 POW

The action of 10 August 1780 was a minor naval engagement that took place off Brest during the American Revolutionary War between a Royal Navy frigate and a French Navy frigate. This was the first engagement thought to involve the use of the carronade.

== Events ==
=== Background ===
The 36-gun frigate HMS Flora (1780) under Captain William Williams was patrolling off Ushant not far from Brest on the afternoon of 10 August 1780. Flora, as well as her nominal armament also carried six recently-introduced 18-pounder carronades.

Through the haze she sighted two vessels, a square-rigged vessel and a cutter, about four miles away. As Flora approached, the cutter edged away, while the square-rigged vessel waited, accepted battle.

=== Action ===
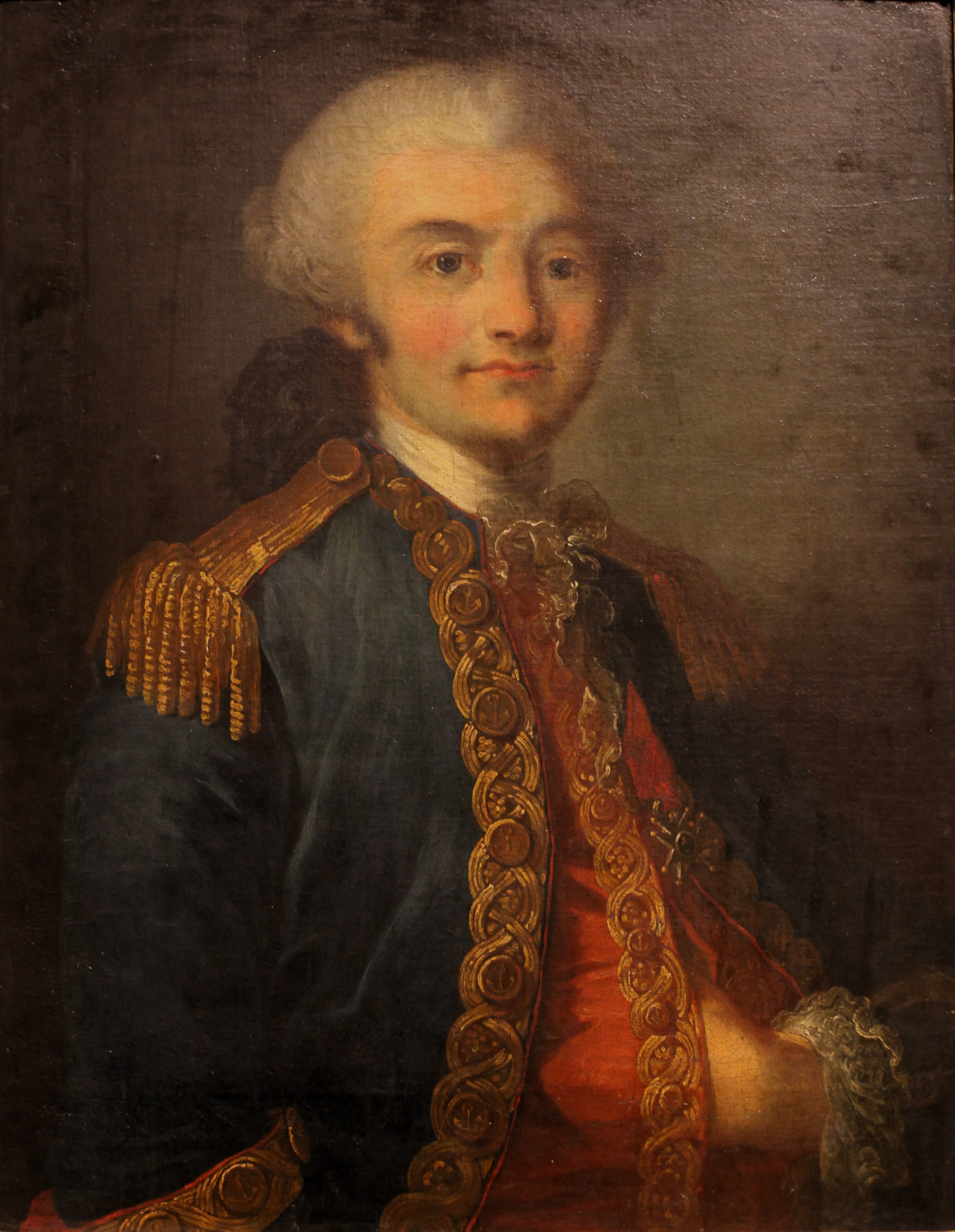
Portrait of Charles-Marie de Trolong du Rumain

When the two ships were within two cables length the French ship raised her colours and opened fire. Moving in, for over an hour the two frigates battered each other relentlessly; Flora being much cut up, moved closer in which the carronades were able to sweep the decks of the French ship with grapeshot. After another 15 minutes the French abandoned their guns and attempted to board, but Flora's crew repulsed the attempt. An explosion of a box of cartridges aboard the Frenchman added further to the carnage. Flora's crew then boarded the French vessel and within moments the French vessel struck. She proved to be the frigate La Nymphe, pierced for 40 guns, but mounting only 32, and commanded by the Chevalier Charles-Marie de Trolong du Rumain, who died that evening of his wounds with command being passed to Lieutenant Pennandref de Keranstret.

=== Aftermath ===
Flora's guns were heavier, 18- and 9-pounders, against the French ship's 12- and 6-pounders. The effect of the new carronades on Flora is reflected in the number of casualties; 9 killed and 17 wounded on Flora out of a crew of 259, and 55 killed and 81 wounded aboard La Nymphe, from a crew of 291. Nymphe was transferred into the Royal Navy (as HMS Nymphe) the following March after repairs at Portsmouth Dockyard.

In the aftermath of La Nymphe being taken by Flora, the Navy Board quickly became enamoured of the carronade and the weapon’s effectiveness in combat. As a result they were soon mounted on many Royal Navy ships.
