= Pierre Jarret de Verchères =

French-Canadian military officer (c.1679–1708)

Pierre Jarret de Verchères (c. 1679 – 1708) was a French-Canadian military officer. His father, François, was the founder of Verchères, now a suburb of Montreal, Quebec. In 1691, as a teenager, along with his older sister Madeleine and his younger brother Alexandre, he helped defend his father's fort for a week. Jarret de Verchères was killed in 1708 after his raiding party was ambushed following an attack on Haverhill, Massachusetts.
