= Étienne Pézard de la Tousche Champlain =

Canadian politician

Étienne Pézard de la Tousche Champlain (1624 – c. 1696) was a soldier and seigneur in New France. He served as acting governor of Montreal in 1664.

The son of Claude Pézard de La Tousche and Marie Masson, he was born in Blois, France and came to Canada in 1661, when he was named lieutenant at Trois-Rivières; he was later named captain. In June 1664, he was put in charge of the garrison at Montreal. Later that month, he married Madeleine Mullois de La Borde. In August of that year, he was granted the seigneury of Champlain.
