= Madeleine de Verchères =

Canadian battle hero (1678–1747)

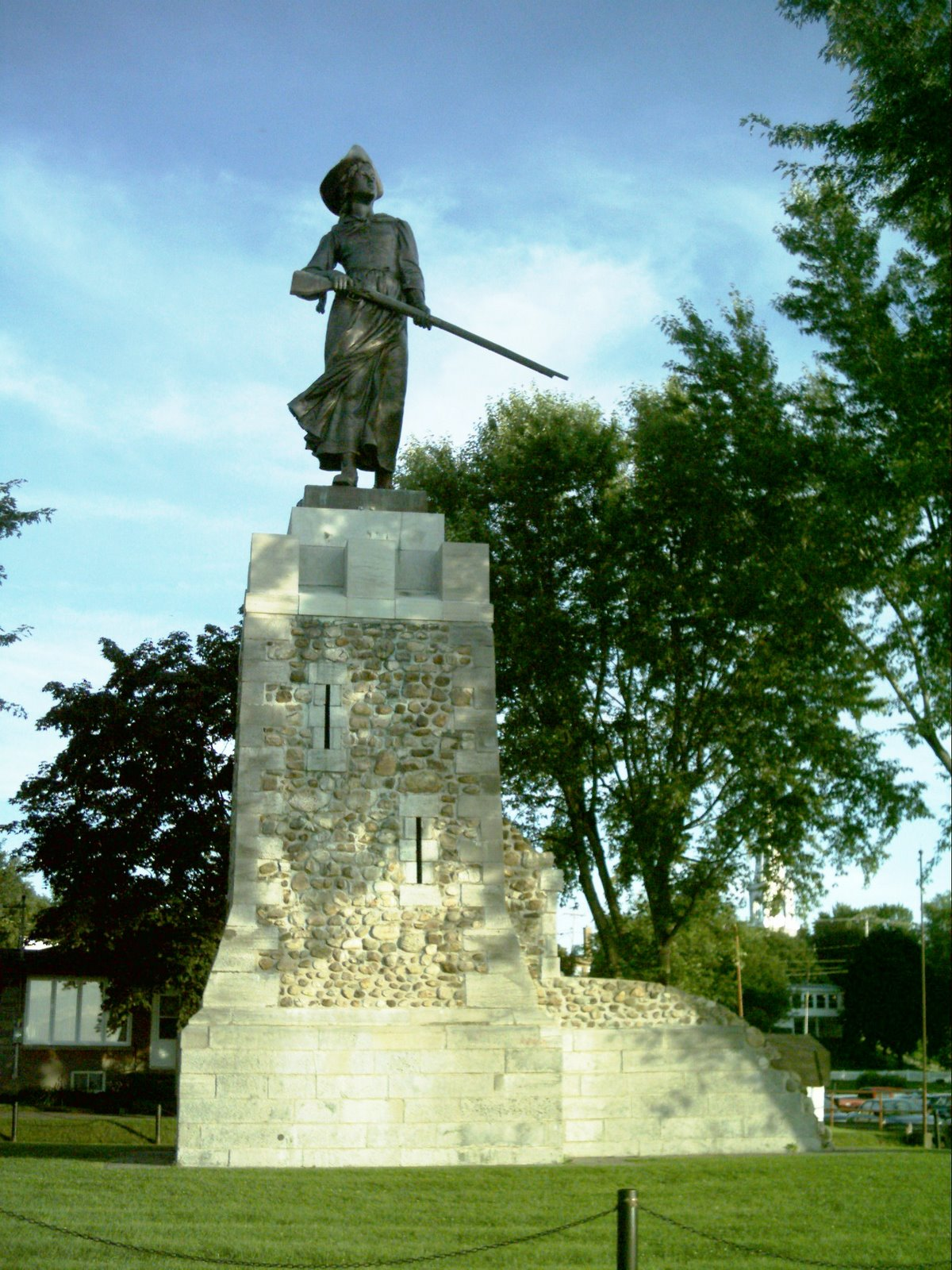
- Louis-Philippe Hébert's monument to Madeleine de Verchères at Verchères, Quebec in 1919
- Born: Marie-Madeleine Jarret de Verchères; 3 March 1678; Verchères, New France
- Died: 8 August 1747 (aged 69); Sainte-Anne-de-la-Pérade, New France
- Parents: François Jarret; Marie Perrot
- Relatives: Pierre Jarret de Verchères (brother)

Marie-Madeleine Jarret, known as Madeleine de Verchères (French pronunciation: [madəlɛn də vɛʁʃɛʁ]; 3 March 1678 – 8 August 1747) was a woman of New France (modern-day Canada) credited with repelling a raid on Fort Verchères when she was 14 years old.

== Early life ==
Marie-Madeleine Jarret de Verchères was born on 3 March 1678 at the riverside settlement of Verchères in New France (now Quebec, Canada). She was the fourth of twelve children in the household of François Jarret de Verchères and Marie Perrot.

Her father had come from the region of Isère in France and had served as an ensign in the Carignan-Salières Regiment. He married Marie Perrot on the Île d'Orléans in 1669. In 1672, he received a land grant along the Saint Lawrence River and developed it into a small farming settlement where his family and several tenant families lived and worked. Because raids by Haudenosaunee (Iroquois) groups along the river were a constant concern, he built a fortified house on the property.

Verchères was baptized on 17 April 1678 in the parish of Saint-Pierre at Sorel. Her godparents were Jean Bonnet dit La Chambre and Marie Mullois, the wife of Pierre de Saint-Ours.

== Fort Verchères ==
Daily life combined routine farm work with the risk of sudden violence. The settlement where Verchères grew up lay on a route between the Saint Lawrence River and the Richelieu River, where Haudenosaunee raiding parties sometimes travelled quietly along the shore or through the woods. Families lived with this in mind: tools were brought in before dusk, livestock kept close at night, and the river watched for unfamiliar canoes.

The small fort where the family lived was built by her father soon after he received his land grant along the Saint Lawrence River. It stood on the south shore of the river near the Richelieu in an area frequently exposed to conflict in the late seventeenth century. Like other private strongholds in New France, it served as a refuge for the Jarret household and their tenant families and as a place to protect livestock and supplies during raids.

Descriptions of similar seigneurial forts indicate that Fort Verchères was a rectangular palisade made of upright logs about 4 to 5 m high (13 to 16 ft), with small wooden bastions at the corners. It had no moat and only one gate, which faced the river. Inside stood the family house, a small redoubt used as a guardhouse and powder store, and simple shelters for people and animals. One or two light guns, likely swivel guns or small field pieces, were mounted mainly for signalling.

These small forts were designed to withstand short attacks rather than long sieges. Their height and enclosed space allowed a small number of defenders to delay attackers until help arrived. Families in the surrounding area were expected to retreat to the fort during alarms, bring livestock inside, assist with watch duties, and help secure the gate. Such routines formed part of Verchères's upbringing.

== Thwarting a surprise attack ==
On the morning of 22 October 1692, Verchères's parents left the fort on business and to gather winter supplies. Most of the soldiers stationed at the fort were also away; they had gone out with several settlers to work in the fields near the palisade. The fourteen-year-old Verchères and her siblings stayed behind.

According to her 1699 account, Verchères was in the cabbage garden, about 200 paces from the fort, when a group of Haudenosaunee descended on the settlers. The soldiers and settlers were taken by surprise, and several were seized almost immediately. Verchères, being closest to the palisade, began to run as soon as she saw the attack. One pursuer caught her by her kerchief, which she slipped from her hands before reaching the gate. She ran inside shouting "Aux armes, aux armes," meaning "to arms," alerting the small group of women, children, and elderly men who had remained within the palisade.

She ran to the bastions, took up a musket, and urged the others in the fort to make as much noise as possible to convince the attackers that the fort had a full garrison. Verchères then fired the cannon to warn nearby settlements of an attack and to call for reinforcements. The Haudenosaunee, who had hoped to take the fort quickly, withdrew into the bushes with their prisoners.

During the standoff, Verchères saw a canoe approaching with a family named Fontaine. When the frightened men inside the fort refused to go to the landing, she ran to the dock herself and brought the family safely inside, pretending to be part of a larger reinforcement party.

Late in the evening, the settlers' cattle returned to the fort. Knowing that attackers sometimes approached under animal skins, Verchères and her two brothers waited at the gate to examine the herd before allowing it inside. No hidden warriors were found.

Reinforcements from Montreal arrived shortly after the Haudenosaunee withdrew. Contemporary accounts report that when the French lieutenant entered the fort, Verchères presented herself and said, "Monseigneur, I surrender to you my arms." The troops pursued the raiding party and recovered several of the settlers who had been captured during the attack. By the time her parents returned, reports of Verchères's actions had already spread through the colony.

== Later life ==
When Verchères's father died on 16 February 1700 his pension of 1000 livres was transferred to her, due to her leadership in 1692, on the condition that she provide for her mother.

She managed Verchères until her marriage in September 1706 to Pierre-Thomas Tarieu de La Pérade, who was a lieutenant in the regular troops of New France. He was the son of Thomas de Lanouguère, an administrator of the colony who descended from an old noble family in France. The couple moved to Sainte-Anne-de-la-Pérade, where Tarieu was co-seigneur.

Her seigneury at Verchères was transferred to her new husband. The complex land titles led to numerous lawsuits over the course of her life, and Verchères sailed to France at least three times to represent herself and her husband in court.

Verchères died at Sainte-Anne-de-la-Pérade on 8 August 1747 at age 69. She was buried beneath her pew at Sainte-Anne-de-la-Pérade.

== Historiography and legacy ==
The earliest reports of the raid of 1692 did not mention Verchères. Five accounts of the siege of 1692 appeared during her lifetime. The earliest is a letter Verchères wrote to the Comtesse de Maurepas on 15 October 1699, in which she gives her story in a petition for a pension. She wrote a longer, greatly embellished version dated 1722 or later to Governor Beauharnois at his request. Claude-Charles de La Potherie in 1722 published two accounts: the first is virtually the same as Verchères's letter of 1699, and the second virtually the same as the later to Beauharnois; both may have been based on, or were even the basis of, Verchères's own. Pierre François Xavier de Charlevoix published another embellished version in 1744. In 1730 Gervais Levebre, a priest against whom Verchères had initiated a legal process, was recorded stating, "God fears neither hero nor heroine", which suggests her story was well known by that time.

Accounts progressively emphasized Verchères disguising herself as a man, the necessity of which is questioned: her mother had commanded a similar defence two years earlier with no such disguise. In her first account, Verchères describes how she escaped from an Haudenosaunee by leaving her scarf in his hands and then replacing her headdress with a soldier's helmet. Charlevoix adds to this that she knotted up her hair and put on a man's jerkin. Later accounts may represent later societies' anxieties over the young woman's transvestism. The 1730 lawsuit was over the priest Levebre's calling Verchères a "whore", which may suggest notions of free sexuality the public had of women who assumed such a traditionally male role as that of a warrior.

Many writers took pains to ensure that, after the siege, Verchères returned fully to her traditional feminine role and demeanor. In 1912, a journalist wrote that she "was a perfect woman, as good a housekeeper as a mother". The curate Frédéric-Alexandre Baillairgé wrote that though "strong, [she] was nonetheless soft and sensitive". Some were more explicit, as Lionel Groulx who wrote that women "must sometimes fill in for men, but they must render them the arms for the battles that are more appropriate for them". While female writers also often emphasized her return to a traditional role supporting the men, others used her story to advance a feminist position of the role of women in Canadian history.

Comparisons have been drawn between Verchères and Joan of Arc—both unmarried teenagers who dressed as males—and to Jeanne Hachette, who led the defence of Beauvais. Parallels have also been seen with Verchères's contemporary Adam Dollard des Ormeaux, the hero of the Battle of Long Sault during the Beaver Wars.

Verchères's story was mostly forgotten following her death. It was revived after the discovery of her in the 1860s, and from the 1880s to the 1920s she achieved the status of a symbol of French-Canadian nationalism. In the wake of the Conscription Crisis of 1917, Marie-Victorin Kirouac wrote a play, Peuple sans histoire ("A people without history", 1918). In it an indignant young French-Canadian servant to Lord Durham, upon reading a report of Durham's following the Lower Canada Rebellion of 1837 in which he declares the French Canadians have no history, appends to it "Thou liest, Durham!" and signs it Madeleine de Verchères. The story he hears from her of Verchères convinces him to give credence to the French Canadians and compares the story to "a canto of the Iliad".

Later authors used her story for nationalistic ends. To rally support for the Imperial Order Daughters of the Empire, Arthur Doughty's account of 1916 makes parallels between the Germans in World War I and the Haudenosaunee who stood in the way of "the advance of European civilization".

While heroes such as Dollard had had monuments erected to their memories, by the early 20th century that there was no such monument to Verchères came to public notice. Baillairgé raised funds for such a monument to commemorate the community and its heroine, and by July 1912 had raised $2000. Other efforts led to the federal government donating $25,000, and the wife of the mayor of Verchères unveiled the statue in a ceremony on 20 September 1913. Among the speeches delivered, the prime minister Wilfrid Laurier declared, "If the kingdom of France was delivered and regenerated by Joan of Arc, this colony, then French in its cradle, was illustrated by Madeleine de Verchères".

Stories of Verchères and Laura Secord in Upper Canada have served as nationalist stories for French and English Canadians. Both were heroines in early Canadian settlements defending themselves from enemy forces—though whereas the enemy was the Haudenosaunee to Verchères, in Secord's story they were allies who helped her escape the Americans to inform the British of a pending attack. The motivations of the Haudenosaunee are not made clear in contemporary documents.

== In modern culture ==
A statue of Madeleine de Verchères stands on Verchères Point near Montreal. It was made by Louis-Philippe Hébert, who was commissioned for the project in 1911.

Madeleine de Verchères, a J.-Arthur Homier film released 10 December 1922, featured Estelle Bélanger as Madeleine. The Internet Movie Database reports this film as "lost."

The Canadian government designated her as a Person of National Historic Significance in 1923.

Madeleine Takes Command (1946) by Ethel C. Brill is a historical novel based upon the siege of Verchères.

== Works cited ==
- Coates, Colin MacMillan; Morgan, Cecilia Louise (2002). Heroines and History: Representations of Madeleine de Verchères and Laura Secord. University of Toronto Press. ISBN 978-0-8020-8330-2.
- Coates, Colin M. (2012). "Commemorating the Woman Warrior of New France: Madeleine de Verchères, 1690s–1920s". In Neatby, Nicole; Hodgins, Peter (eds.). Settling and Unsettling Memories: Essays in Canadian Public History. University of Toronto Press. pp. 29–46. ISBN 978-0-8020-3816-6.
- Dodd, Dianne (Summer 2009). "Canadian Historic Sites and Plaques: Heroines, Trailblazers, The Famous Five". CRM: The Journal of Heritage Stewardship. 6 (2). US National Park Service. Archived from the original on September 23, 2020.
- Leckie, Robert (1999). A Few Acres of Snow: The Saga of the French and Indian Wars. Castle Books. ISBN 978-0-7858-2100-7.
- Wallace, W. Stewart, ed. The Encyclopedia of Canada, Vol. VI Toronto, University Associates of Canada, 1948. Online
- Vachon, André (1974). "Jarret de Verchères, Marie-Madeleine". Dictionary of Canadian Biography. University of Toronto/Université Laval.
- Morgan, Lewis (1818). "Lewis Henry Morgan: American anthropologist". Britannica Encyclopedia. Vol. 1. Encyclopædia Britannica.
