= George Broadfoot =

Scottish Army officer

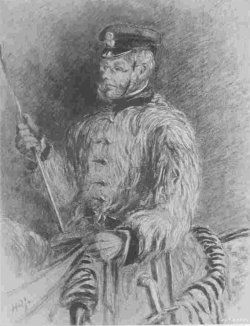
- Born: 21 March 1807; Kirkwall, Scotland, United Kingdom
- Died: 21 December 1845 (aged 38); Ferozeshah, Sikh Empire
- Military career
- Allegiance: East India Company
- Branch: Madras Army
- Rank: Major
- Conflicts: First Anglo-Afghan War; First Anglo-Sikh War
- Awards: Companion of the Order of the Bath

Major George Broadfoot CB (21 March 1807 – 21 December 1845) was a Scottish army officer in the Madras Army of the East India Company.

== Biography ==
=== Early life ===
Broadfoot was born in Kirkwall, Orkney, the eldest surviving son of Reverend William Broadfoot. At the age of ten he moved with his family to London where he was educated. In 1825 he obtained a cadetship in the East India Company and on his arrival in India in January 1826 he was posted to the 34th Regiment of Madras Native Infantry as an ensign. During this period he became good friends with Colin Mackenzie, who sailed on the same ship to India. After seven years service in Madras, Broadfoot returned to England where he would remain for the following five years. Whilst back in Europe he travelled in France, Germany and Italy, and towards the end of his furlough in 1836 he held the appointment of orderly officer at Addiscombe Military Seminary for thirteen months. He returned to India in 1838 and was appointed to the Commissariat Department of the Madras Army under the command of William Cullen.

=== Afghanistan ===
At the outbreak of the First Anglo-Afghan War, despite having no experience in northern India, he was rewarded for his services in Madras with re-deployment to the frontier provinces. He was initially placed in command of the escort which accompanied the families of Shah Sujah and Zaman Shah from Delhi to Kabul. The journey involved traversing the Punjab which had descended into a state of near anarchy following the death of Ranjit Singh and the convoy was frequently at risk from marauding soldiers and bandits. On reaching Kabul, part of the escort was formed into a company of sappers and miners, which, under the command of Broadfoot, marched with Sir Robert Sale's force from Kabul to Jalalabad in October 1841. Broadfoot was specially mentioned in the dispatches for his gallantry in the actions with the Afghans between Kabul and Gandamak. At Jalalabad Broadfoot became garrison engineer, and by his skill and vigour speedily restored the defences of the town, which had been found in a ruinous condition. Having no men from the Sappers and Miners available, he used Gurkha troops as an ad hoc engineer workforce. During the siege of Jalalabad by the Afghans, Broadfoot (now a captain), aided by his friend Henry Havelock, then a Captain of foot, was instrumental in preventing a capitulation, which at one time had been resolved on by Sir Robert Sale and a majority of the principal officers of the force. In one of the sorties made by the beleaguered garrison Broadfoot was severely wounded. He subsequently accompanied General Pollock's army of retribution to Kabul, again distinguishing himself in the actions which were fought at Mammu Khél, Jagdallak, and Tezín. At the close of the war he was created a Companion of the Order of the Bath, and was appointed Commissioner of Moulmein. He arrived in Moulmein in April 1843, and was tasked with reforming the corrupt practices and maladministration of the province.

=== Punjab ===
In 1844, the Governor-General Sir Henry Hardinge appointed Broadfoot as his Agent of the North-West Frontier, at the time one of the most prestigious posts in India. He was based in the Punjab, which remained in a state of chaos, and was instructed to keep his superiors acquainted with developments in the region in case of any potential violations on the frontier which might compel the Bengal Army to engage militarily. In May 1845 he went to Shimla to recover from anxiety and stress caused by overwork. Around the same time an outbreak of cholera in the Punjab caused a restraint in the turbulence of the Sikh army and a significant reduction in violence. In August 1845, Broadfoot received a messenger from Gulab Singh who invited the British to raise an uprising against the Sikhs and offered his support, in favour of a financial reward and retaining Jammu and neighbouring territories. Broadfoot ordered that no reply be made to the Gulab Singh's offer.

=== Death ===
Towards the end of 1845, the First Anglo-Sikh War broke out. He was present at the battles of Mudki and Ferozeshah. Broadfoot was shot in the heart at Ferozeshah on 21 December 1845. He was first wounded through both thighs and thrown off his horse, and on immediately mounting his horse again he was pierced through the heart and arm and killed. His death and his services were thus described in Sir Henry Hardinge's report on the battle:

It is now with great pain that I have to record the irreparable loss I have sustained, and more especially the East India Company's service, in the death of Major Broadfoot of the Madras army, my political agent. He was thrown from his horse by a shot, and I failed in prevailing upon him to leave the field. He remounted, and shortly afterwards received a mortal wound. He was brave as he was able in every branch of the political and military service.

The Governor-General organised and attended Broadfoot's funeral service at the cantonment at Ferozepur, where he was buried alongside Sir Robert Sale. The Arab horse on which Broadfoot was riding when he was killed, which was shot twice in the course of events, was brought to full health by Hardinge and retained in his private stud. His friend Henry Havelock would go on to name his son George Broadfoot in his honour.
