= Kenneth Mackenzie (governor) =

British landowner and governor of Grenada

Kenneth Francis Mackenzie
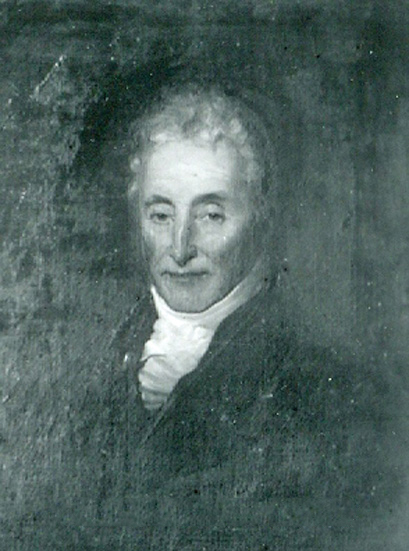

Governor of Grenada
- In office 2 March 1795 – 12 December 1795
- Preceded by: Ninian Home
- Succeeded by: Samuel Mitchell

Personal details
- Born: 1748/1751 Scotland
- Died: 13th July 1831 Portman Square, Belgravia, London
- Citizenship: British
- Spouse: Anne Townsend Mackenzie
- Children: 11, including Colin and Charles
- Occupation: Land owner and governor of Grenada

Kenneth Francis Mackenzie (1751 – 14 July 1831) was a prominent land owner in the Caribbean and served as the interim Governor of Grenada for nine months during the Fédon revolt (1795–1796).

== Biography ==
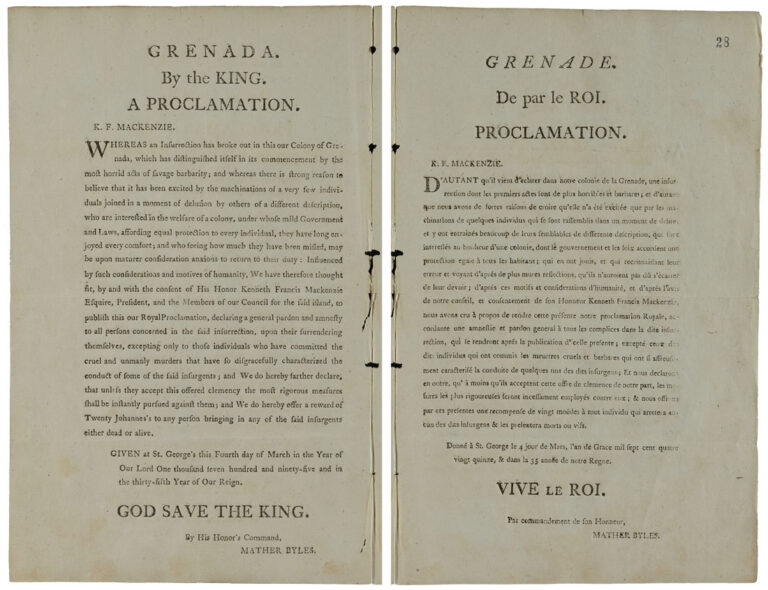
Proclamation of Kenneth Mackenzie offering amnesty to the Grenadian rebels who had not committed murder.

Kenneth Mackenzie was born in 1751 to Scottish parents Colin and Mary. He was a descendant of the Mackenzie clan of Redcastle. He was active across the Caribbean from the 1780s onwards and was the owner of Lusignan estate which was in Demerara in British Guiana. He also lived in Tobago in 1781. In 1793 Kenneth Mackenzie was appointed attorney general of Grenada, then in 1795 he was appointed interim Governor of Grenada after the death of Ninian Home at the hands of the rebellious slaves under the command of Julien Fédon. He served for nine months before stepping down in favour of Samuel Mitchell who also served as interim Governor.

In 1801 he decided to leave his estate in Guiana, and he sold portions of it off, most notably in 1828 when he sold half the estate to Spencer Mackay, he returned to the UK, where he died in 1831. He had eleven children with Anne Townsend Mackenzie, most notable being Colin Mackenzie and Charles Mackenzie, after Kenneth's death half of the estate's wealth was passed on to his wife.
