= Helen Douglas Mackenzie =

British writer (1819–1910)

- Born: 1819
- Died: 1910 (aged 90–91)
- Spouse: Lieutenant general Colin Mackenzie
- Parent: John Erskine Douglas

Helen Douglas Mackenzie (1819–1910), who sometimes published as Mrs Colin Mackenzie, was an English mission worker and writer. She spent six years in the northern frontiers of India, living at army outposts and carrying out informal mission work among Afghan and Indian people. Helen published her journals as Life in the Mission, the Camp, and the Zenáná, or, Six Years in India (1853–7). The book provides insights into domestic life in the nineteenth-century zenana and the Sheesh Mahal immediately after the fall of the Sikh Empire. She also published a translated devotional work and a biography of her husband. Helen was hearing impaired by the age of 29.

== Early life ==
Volume II of Mackenzie's book Life in the Mission (1853)

Helen Catherine Douglas was born in 1819, the eldest daughter of Admiral John Erskine Douglas. In 1838, she met Indian army officer Colin Mackenzie, who was a widower aged thirty-two. When Mackenzie returned in 1843 after the First Afghan War, he and Helen married.

In an 1848 letter, Thomas Carlyle describes her as a 'little deaf lady' and says that she listened to her husband speak 'with her ear within two inches of his mouth'.

== Time in India ==
Frontispiece illustration from Life in the Mission (1853)

The Mackenzies travelled to India in 1846, where Colin was given the command of a Sikh regiment on the northern frontier. They travelled to the station at Ludhiana via a visit to Dehli. In Ludhiana, they lived in the compound of the American Presbyterian Mission, where Helen learned the local dialect and built up a supply of livestock. Helen helped with the work of raising the Sikh regiment: keeping the accounts, copying out dispatches, and making rosettes for the custom hats which were made for the Sikh soldiers to accommodate their long hair. She also provided medicine and bible readings to the people around her, especially the Afghan families who had been exiled to Ludhiana for their pro-English stance. Two of the servants converted to Christianity and she attempted to set up a school for their children.

Throughout the Mackenzies' time in India, they were forbidden from preaching to the soldiers. However, Helen supported missionaries and mission schools, and was involved in 'zenana missions' which reached Muslim women in their homes and provided them with partial bible translations in Urdu. She promoted the practices of field preaching and prayer meetings, and arranged for children orphaned in the Anglo-Afghan war to be brought up by missionaries.

Helen spent a lot of time in the home of Hasan Khan, a Muslim army officer whom the Mazkenzies had met in Ludhiana. When one of his four wives, Leila Bibi, became ill, Mackenzie visited them daily to share medicines from her stock and to pray. This experience allowed her to write about the Muslim zenana; she was critical of male writers who wrote about it without having access to women’s spaces.

Mackenzie's painting of Maharaja Duleep Singh, November 1849

In 1849, the Mackenzies moved to the Punjab, which had just been annexed to the British Raj in the Second Anglo-Sikh War. They visited the Sheesh Mahal in Lahore, where Helen made several sketches and was asked to paint a portrait of the eleven-year-old Maharaja Duleep Singh, who had been deposed that year.

== Publications ==
On her return to England, Helen published her account of her time in India under several titles including variations on Life in the Mission and Six Years in India. The book went through thirteen editions between 1853 and 1857. The book has been criticised for its patronising attitude towards India and Islam; however, it has also been described as more sympathetic and balanced than other English accounts of colonial-era India, especially later in the nineteenth century. It has also been useful to historians because of its eyewitness account of social and domestic settings such as the zenana and the mission school in Kolkata which Helen visited in 1849.

In 1858, Mackenzie, who had travelled widely in Germany, published a translation of Charlotte Nebelin's Der große Versöhnungstag as The Great Day of Atonement; or meditations and prayers on the last hours of the sufferings and death of Our Lord and Saviour Jesus Christ.

In 1884, Mackenzie published a biography of her husband, Storms and Sunshine of a Soldier’s Life.

She died in 1910.
