= Alexander Houstoun =

Scottish politician and colonial governor

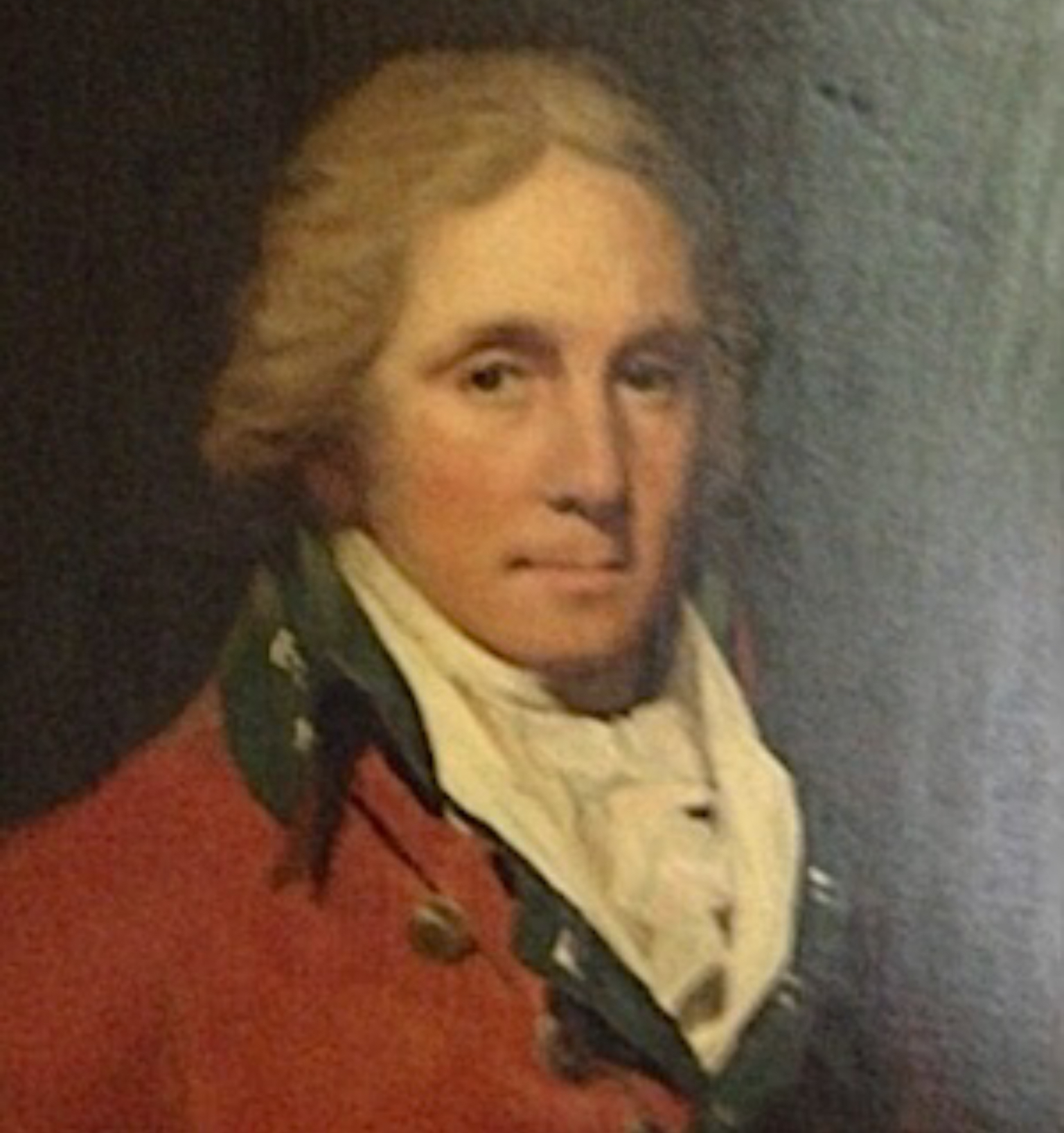

Governor of Grenada
- In office 1796 – 30 September 1797
- Preceded by: Samuel Mitchell (governor)
- Succeeded by: Sir Charles Green, 1st Baronet

Personal details
- Born: 4 October 1752 Renfrew, Scotland
- Died: 22 March 1822 (aged 69) Clerkington, Scotland
- Occupation: Trader, Politician, and Governor

Alexander Houstoun Jr. (4 October 1752 – 22 March 1822) was a Scottish politician who served as the interim governor of Grenada from 1796 to 30 September 1797. He was succeeded by Sir Charles Green.

== Biography ==
Alexander Houstoun of Clerkington was born in Renfrew, Scotland on the 4th October 1752 to Alexander Houstoun (1709–1777) and Elizabeth Rae (1709–1804). Some sources have mistakenly placed Houstoun’s birth in 1770, mixing up Alexander Houstoun Jr. with his nephew also named Alexander Houstoun (son of Col. Andrew Houstoun).

Houston's father Alexander was the founder of a Glasgow merchant firm called "Alexander Houston & Co." which traded in the West Indies starting in the 1750s, the firm owned multiple ships. In 1777, the firm was inherited by Alexander Houstoun Jr. The firm had shipping routes between Glasgow and various locations in the West Indies, even being recommended by Ninian Home. Alexander Houstoun & Co. went bankrupt in 1801, the firm owed a total of £343,945 to planters in the West Indies (which would equate to over £34 million in modern terms).

Belmont estate in 1821, owned by Houstoun at the time

Alexander Houstoun was the last interim governor during Fédon's rebellion, succeeding Samuel Mitchell. He oversaw the end of the conflict and the confiscation of properties and executions of rebels.

He served as the MP for Glasgow (Clyde Burghs), his first term was between 1802 and 1803, his second term was between 1809–1812 and his last term was 1818–1820.

He died on the 22 March 1822 in Clerkington.
