= Balthazard Flotte de La Frédière =

Canadian politician

Balthazard-Annibal-Alexis Flotte de La Frédière (d. after 1682) was a soldier in New France. He served as acting governor of Montreal from 1666 to 1667. His name appears as Balthazard in some sources; in some lists of the governors of Montreal, his name appears as Balthazard ou (or) Annibal-Alexis.

The son of Jean Balthazard Flotte de La Frédière and Claudine de Chastellard, he was the nephew of the Marquis de Salières, a commander of the Carignan-Salières Regiment. De La Frédière had apparently been disfigured by the loss of an eye. He came to New France aboard the Aigle d'Or in August 1665 leading a company as captain and major; his brother Henri was a lieutenant in the same company. (In some lists of the company, his brother's name appears as Annibal Alexis). The following year, he helped in the construction of Fort Sainte Thérèse. He took part in an expedition against the Mohawks. De La Frédière was wounded during a battle with the Iroquois in 1666.

A complaint was lodged by the residents of Montreal against de La Frédière for his drunkenness, immoral behaviour and for selling liquor (which was said to be of inferior quality) to the natives. He was called back to France in the fall of 1667 over the protests of his uncle.

In 1682, he married Françoise Falcoz in France.

The rue de La Fredière in Saint-Jean-sur-Richelieu was named after him.
