= Jean Faudoas de Cérillac =

French Governor of Grenada

Governor of Grenada
- In office 1658–1664
- Preceded by: Jean François Dubuc
- Succeeded by: Jean Faudoas de Cérillac II (unofficial from 1662–1664) Monsieur de Vincent (official)

Personal details
- Born: 1593/1600 France
- Died: 1679
- Children: Jean Faudoas de Cérillac II

Jean de Faudoas (1593/1600-1679) was the Comte (Count) of Cérillac/Sérillac and served as governor of Grenada from 1658 to 1664. He succeeded Jean Francois Dubuc as governor.

== Biography ==
Faudoas acquired the island of Grenada and the Grenadines from Jacques Dyel Du Parquet in 1656 for 90000 Livres and the sale was ratified on April 26 the following year. He ruled Grenada and the Grenadine islands as a tyrant according to the merchants and traders who complained to the French government. Cérillac sentenced two men to death due to revolting against the king and the governor of the island (which added to his tyrannical reputation). He retired and his son (also named Jean) became the unofficial governor from 1662 until 1664 when he was succeeded by Monsieur Vincent.
