= John Erskine Douglas =

Royal Navy Admiral (1758–1847)

Admiral John Erskine Douglas
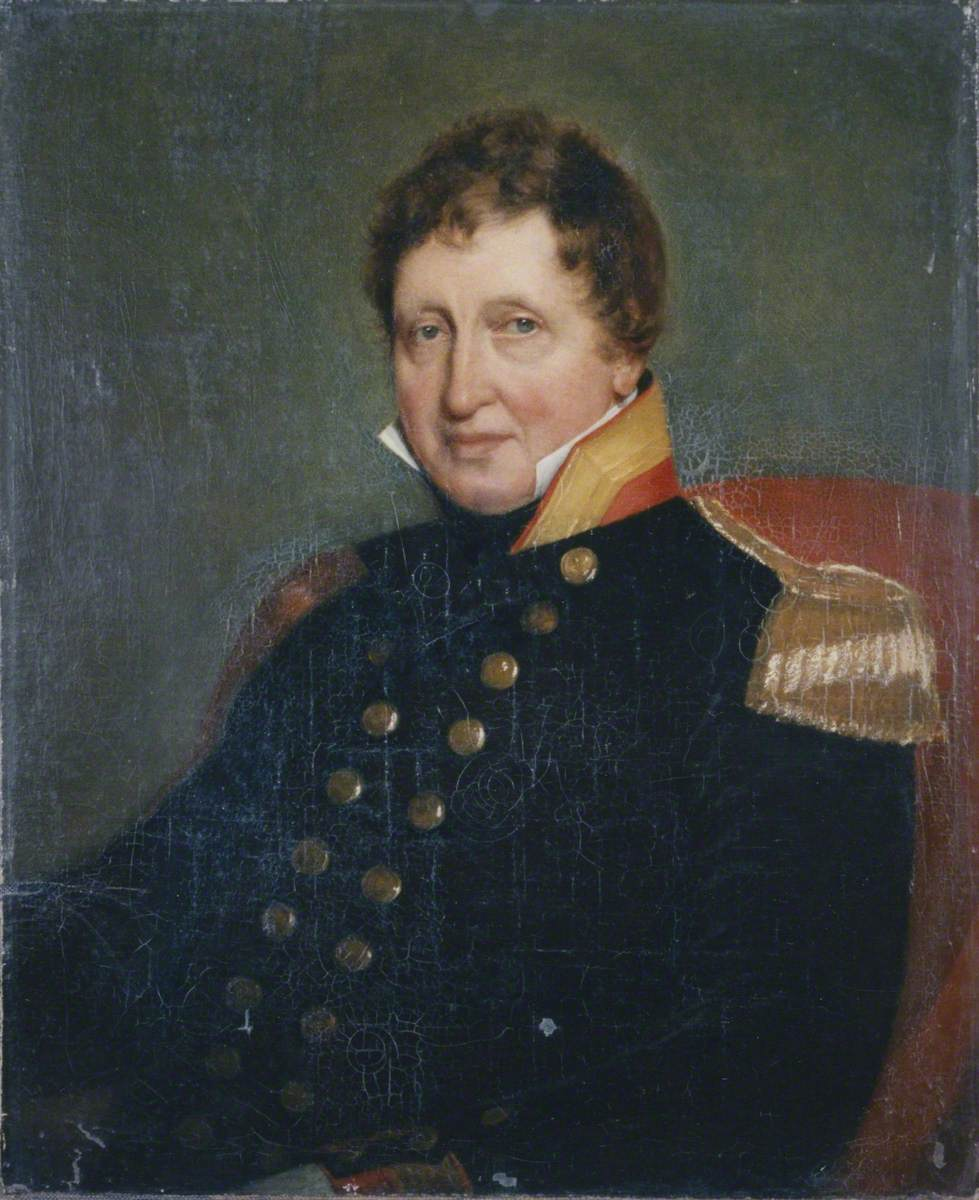
- Born: c. 1758
- Died: 25 July 1847; Sparrows, nr. Watford, Hertfordshire
- Military career
- Allegiance: United Kingdom
- Branch: Royal Navy
- Rank: Admiral
- Commands: Jamaica Station
- Conflicts: French Revolutionary Wars; Napoleonic Wars; Atlantic campaign of 1806; Battle of Basque Roads

Admiral John Erskine Douglas (c. 1758 – 25 July 1847) was a senior British Royal Navy officer of the early nineteenth century who served in a number of vessels and participated at the destruction of the French ship of the line Impétueux in 1806 and the victory over the French off Brest during the Battle of Basque Roads in 1809. He also served in the Mediterranean and off Norfolk, Virginia, where he gained notoriety by searching American vessels for British deserters without asking permission from the American authorities. He later served as commander in chief at Jamaica and rose through the ranks to full admiral. He amassed a fortune, and when he died Douglas left over 40,000l. to his daughters.

== Life ==
The son of David Douglas, a descendant of James Douglas, 2nd earl of Queensberry, Douglas was born in the later 1750s, and joined the British Royal Navy at a young age, reaching the rank of commander in 1794 at the outbreak of the French Revolutionary Wars. Within a year he had been made a post captain and taken command of the small frigate HMS Garland, which he commanded in the North Sea until 1798, when he transferred to the larger frigate HMS Boston. Boston was stationed off the Eastern Seaboard of the United States, intercepting numerous French merchant ships trading with American ports. For a time he blockaded the French frigate Sémillante, but by 1801 had sailed for the West Indies, operating in the Leeward Islands and then moving north to Halifax, Nova Scotia, where he remained until 1804, continuing in employment throughout the Peace of Amiens.

On his return to Britain, Douglas was given the 80-gun ship of the line HMS Impetueux, moving in 1805 to the 74-gun HMS Bellona, which participated in the Atlantic campaign of 1806 as part of the squadron under Vice-Admiral Sir Richard Strachan. Ordered to the Eastern Seaboard of the United States, Bellona was cruising with HMS Belleisle off Cape Henry on 14 September 1806 when the French ship of the line Impétueux was spotted steering into the Chesapeake. Impétueux had been caught in a hurricane earlier in the summer and was badly damaged, limping to port under jury masts. Closely pursued, Impétueux was driven on shore by her captain and the crew scrambled onto the beach as British boats boarded and captured the wreck. Although British intervention on American shore was a clear violation of American neutrality in the war, there was no protest from the American authorities – the only complaint coming from the French consul at Norfolk. Damaged beyond repair, the wreck of Impétueux was burnt on the beach.

Douglas remained off the Chesapeake during 1807 in command of a squadron of smaller vessels observing two French ships of the line at anchor in Hampton Roads. This squadron became embroiled in the controversy surrounding the removal of British deserters from American-flagged vessels that ended with the Chesapeake-Leopard Affair in July 1807 and Douglas exchanged angry letters with the Mayor of Norfolk. Returning to Europe in 1808, Bellona was attached to the Channel Fleet and in 1809 was part of the blockade fleet under Lord Gambier that destroyed a number of French ships at the Battle of Basque Roads. Moving to the North Sea in 1810, Douglas captured the privateer L'Heros du Nord and in 1812 transferred to the 98-gun second rate HMS Prince of Wales in the Mediterranean, where he remained for the rest of the war.

In 1814, Douglas was promoted to rear-admiral and from 1816 served as commander in chief of the Jamaica Station, remaining in the post until 1817. Retiring from active service, Douglas continued to rise through the ranks, becoming a vice-admiral in 1825 and a full admiral in 1838. He died aged 89 at Swallows near Watford in Hertfordshire on 25 July 1847, leaving the considerable fortune of 40,000l. (£3,834,100 as of 2025) to his daughters, with a proviso that his sister receive 150l. a year.

== See also ==
- O'Byrne, William Richard (1849). "Douglas, John Erskine" . A Naval Biographical Dictionary . John Murray – via Wikisource.

== Notes ==
Military offices
Preceded by Sir Alexander Cochrane	Commander-in-Chief, Jamaica Station; 1816–1817	Succeeded by Sir Home Riggs Popham
