= Valentine Morris =

British landowner and colonial administrator (1727–1789)

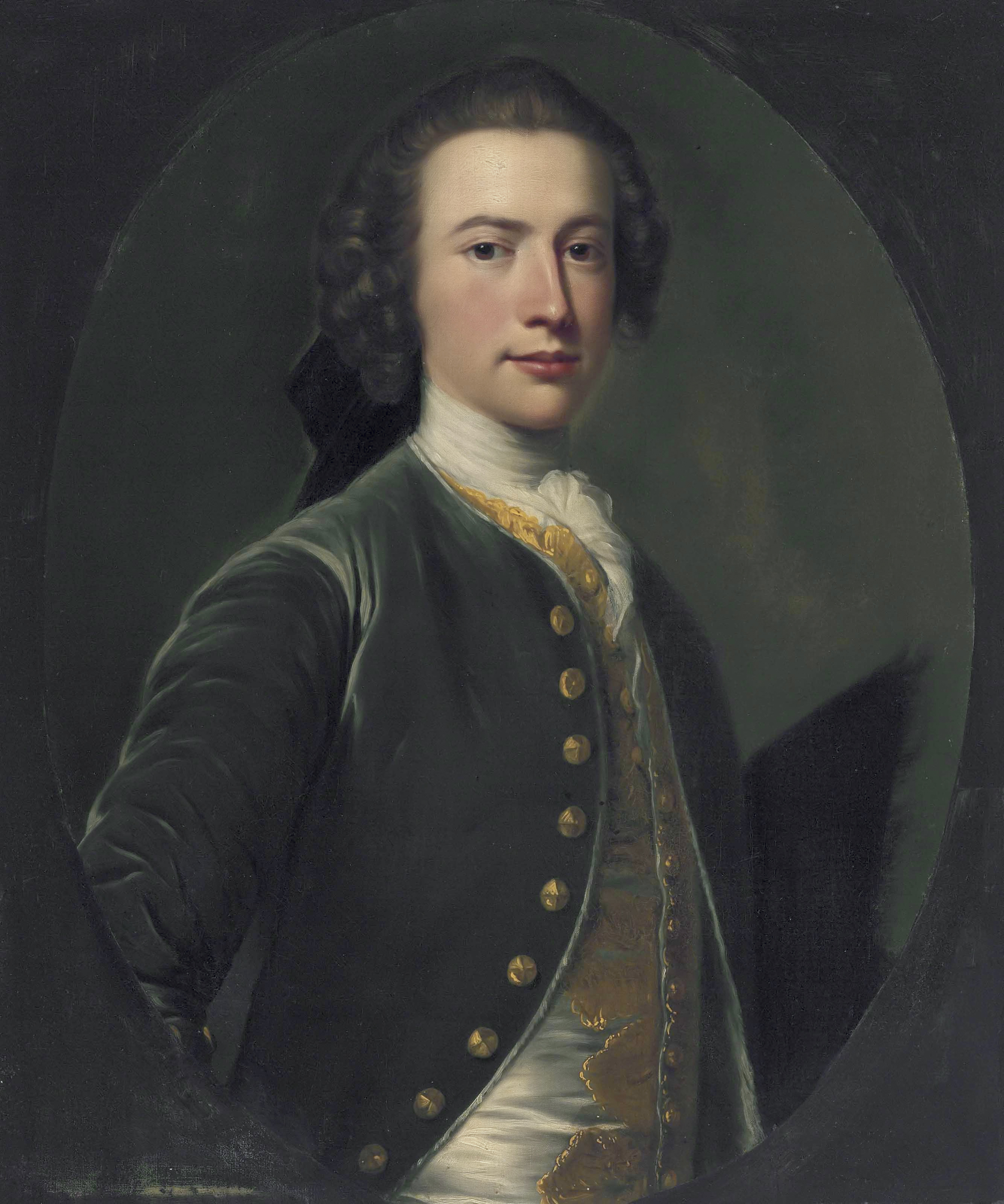
- Portrait by Allan Ramsay, c. 1765
- Born: 27 October 1727; Antigua, West Indies
- Died: 26 August 1789 (aged 61); Bloomsbury, London
- Other name: Valentin Morris
- Occupations: Landowner, politician
- Known for: Development of Piercefield Park; Governor of St. Vincent

Valentine Morris (27 October 1727 – 26 August 1789) was a British landowner and colonial administrator who served as the governor of Saint Vincent from 1772 to 1779. He was also responsible for developing the picturesque woodland walks at Piercefield House in the Wye Valley, which Morris owned.

== Life ==
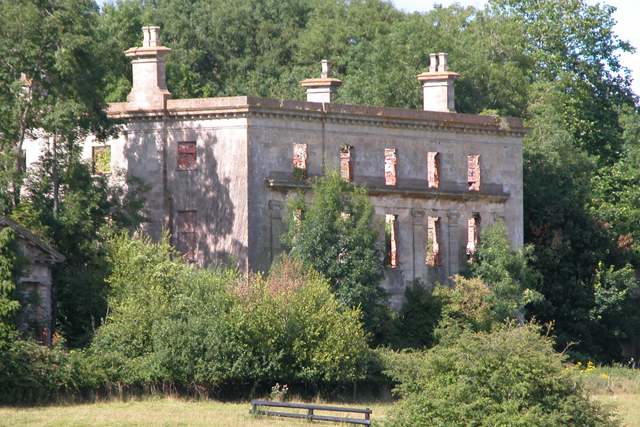
Ruin of Piercefield House

Born in Antigua, in the West Indies, Valentine Morris was the son of Colonel Valentine Morris (c. 1678–1743), a sugar plantation owner and merchant who claimed descent from the Walter family of Monmouthshire and who, in 1740, bought Piercefield House near Chepstow.

On his father's death, the younger Valentine Morris, who was then attending school in London, inherited Piercefield. In 1748 he married Mary Mordaunt, a niece of the third Earl of Peterborough, and began living at Piercefield with his family in 1753. Morris added to the magnificent splendour of the estate and its setting, by landscaping the parkland, with the help of Richard Owen Cambridge, in the fashionable style of Capability Brown. At a time when tourism in the Wye valley was starting to become popular, Piercefield was developed into a park of national reputation, as one of the earliest examples of Picturesque landscaping. Morris laid out walks through the woodland and included a grotto, druid's temple, bathing house and giant's cave. He also developed viewpoints along the clifftop above the River Wye, and opened the park up to visitors. One of the many tourists to marvel at this view was the poet Coleridge, who wrote: "Oh what a godly scene....The whole world seemed imaged in its vast circumference."

Morris was strongly in favour of road improvement, and promoted the first Turnpike Bill in Monmouthshire, enacted in 1755 (28 Geo. 2. c. 31). He gave evidence to the House of Commons that there were no roads in Monmouthshire and, when asked how people travelled, replied: "We travel in ditches." As trustee of several turnpike trusts, he was responsible for maintaining and improving the roads from Chepstow to Raglan, Woolaston, and Beachley, often against the wishes of the local gentry who owned the land through which improvements were made. He was responsible for ensuring the building of over 300 miles of turnpike roads in Monmouthshire and Gloucestershire during the 1760s. As a magistrate, he also imposed standardised weights and measures in trading, for the first time in the area .

However, Morris' personal generosity and his gambling, business and political dealings took him into financial difficulty. In 1771, Thomas Morgan, MP for Monmouthshire and a member of the powerful Morgan family of Tredegar House, died, and Morris resolved to stand in the by-election against Thomas' brother, John. A contested election was highly unusual at the time, and the Morgans attacked Morris as an outsider, a Creole, and a slave owner. For his part, Morris appealed to the "honest unbiassed men" of Monmouthshire to "shake off all shackles, assert your independency, and once in your life have courage to dare elect the man of your choice". Morris lost the election, by 535 votes to Morgan's 743.

After failing to be elected, Morris was forced by both political and financial pressures to set sail for his estates in Antigua. In 1772 he became Governor of the island of Saint Vincent, which had ceded by France under the terms of the Treaty of Paris in 1763. According to an 1801 memoir of Morris by William Coxe, while there he "laboured with so much zeal and activity in promoting the cultivation of the island, that he almost made of it another Piercefield." He helped defend it at his own expense against the French, but, in 1779, negotiated its surrender to French forces. He later brought charges against the American-born military commander of the island, Lt. Colonel George Etherington, on the grounds of "neglect of duty and ... improper behaviour in the face of the enemy." However, Etherington was acquitted and recent research has suggested that Morris may have been motivated by vindictiveness against him.

By now reduced to poverty, he returned to London. His wife had attempted suicide and been confined to a madhouse. He was imprisoned for debt, surrendered his estates in the West Indies, and had to sell Piercefield in 1784. He died in London in 1789, aged 61.

Government offices
Preceded by Ulysses FitzMaurice	Governor of Saint Vincent; 1772–1779	Succeeded by Charles-Marie de Trolong du Rumain
