= Robert Melvill =

Scottish soldier, antiquary, botanist, inventor and slave plantation owner

General Robert Melvill FRS FRSE FSAS FSA
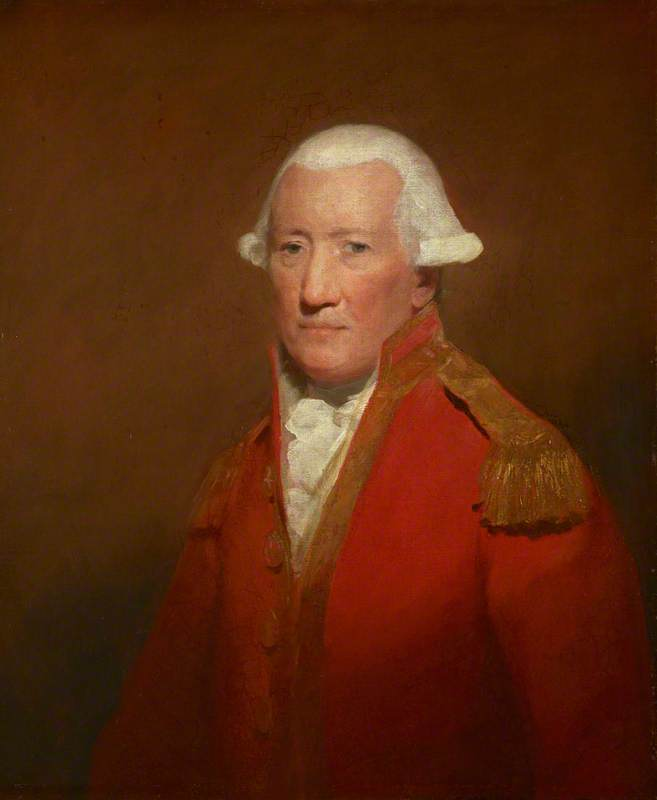
- Portrait by Henry Raeburn
- Born: 12 October 1723; Monimail, Fife, Scotland
- Died: 29 August 1809 (aged 85)

General Robert Melvill FRS FRSE FSAS FSA (or Melville; 12 October 1723 – 29 August 1809) was a Scottish officer in the British Army, antiquary, botanist, inventor, and slave plantation owner. He was owner of the Melville Hall (Dominica) and Carnbee (Tobago) estates.

Melvill invented (1759) the carronade, a cast-iron cannon popular for 100 years, in co-operation with the Carron Iron Works (from which it takes its name). He founded the Saint Vincent and the Grenadines Botanic Gardens in the West Indies.

== Life ==
Melville was born in Monimail in Scotland, the son of Rev Andrew Melville, a clergyman, and Helen Whytt, sister of Dr. Robert Whytt. As a member of the noble Melville family, he was related to the Earls of Leven and Earls of Melville. He was educated at the grammar school in Leven, and attended Glasgow University (at the same time as Adam Smith) but left to study medicine at Edinburgh University.

He left his studies a second time and joined the 25th Foot (originally raised by David Melville, 3rd Earl of Leven in 1689, and later known as the King's Own Scottish Borderers) as an ensign in 1744 in Flanders, and fought that year at the Battle of Fontenoy, where 1/3 of the regiment was killed. After the Battle of Ath, he returned with the regiment to Scotland to put down the Jacobite rising of 1745, and was besieged by the Jacobites in Blair Castle before fighting at the Battle of Culloden. He continued the war in Flanders at the battles of Roucoux and Lauffeld. He was a lieutenant by 1748, and was promoted to captain in 1751.

He was a major in the 38th Foot in 1756, and served in the West Indies in the Seven Years' War. He assisted with the capture of several French islands, including Guadeloupe, Martinique, and Dominica, and was promoted to lieutenant-colonel. He was wounded in the capture of Guadeloupe, and as a result later grew blind. He became Lieutenant-Governor of Guadeloupe in 1759, but his superior died and he became governor in 1760 with the rank of brigadier-general. Under the 1763 Treaty of Paris, Guadeloupe, Martinique, and Saint Lucia were returned to France, but Grenada, the Grenadines, Dominica, St Vincent and Tobago were ceded to Britain. Melville was governor of the ceded islands (apart from Grenada) from 1763 to 1770. He was acting governor of Grenada in 1764 and again in 1770 to 1771. According to David Alston, the policies pursued by Melvill's administration exacerbated sectarian tensions between recently arrived Scots Presbyterian planters and the longer-established French Catholic settlers, turning Grenada into a divided and feud-ridden colony.

Melville returned to Scotland in 1771, where he is credited with inventing the carronade in the 1770s (originally named the "melvillade" in his honour). In later life, he became well known as an antiquary, and was a Fellow of the Society of Antiquaries. He was elected a Fellow of the Royal Society of London in February 1775. In 1789 he was elected a Fellow of the Royal Society of Edinburgh. His proposers were Adam Smith, James Hutton and Robert Kerr. In 1871 he was listed in a freemasonic calendar as the Provincial Grand Master for Grenada.

When he died, in 1809, he was the oldest general but one in the British Army. He never married.

Government offices
Preceded by George Scott	Governor of Grenada acting 1764	Succeeded by Ulysses FitzMaurice
Preceded by Ulysses FitzMaurice	Governor of Grenada acting 1770–1771	Succeeded by Ulysses FitzMaurice
