= Zacharie Dupuy =

Canadian politician

Zacharie Dupuy (French pronunciation: [zakaʁi dypɥi]; 1608 or 1610 – 1676) was a soldier and seigneur in New France. He served as acting governor of Montreal in 1662, from 1665 to 1666 and from 1667 to 1668. He was sometimes called sieur de Verdun. His surname sometimes appears as Dupuis.

== Biography ==
He was born at Saverdun, County of Foix, France. Dupuy served as commandant at Quebec City and then set out on an expedition to establish a Jesuit mission among the Onondagas. He returned to Montreal in 1658 as assistant town-major. In 1662, he became town-major for Montreal. In 1671, he was granted the fief of Verdun and, in 1672, the Île aux Hérons and other islands.

Dupuy was married twice: first to Jeanne Fauvenel, who probably died before he came to New France, and then to Jeanne Groisard in 1668.

He died in Montreal and was buried on July 1, 1676.

The Montreal borough of Verdun was named in his honour.
