= Charles-Marie de Trolong du Rumain =

French Navy officer and colonial administrator

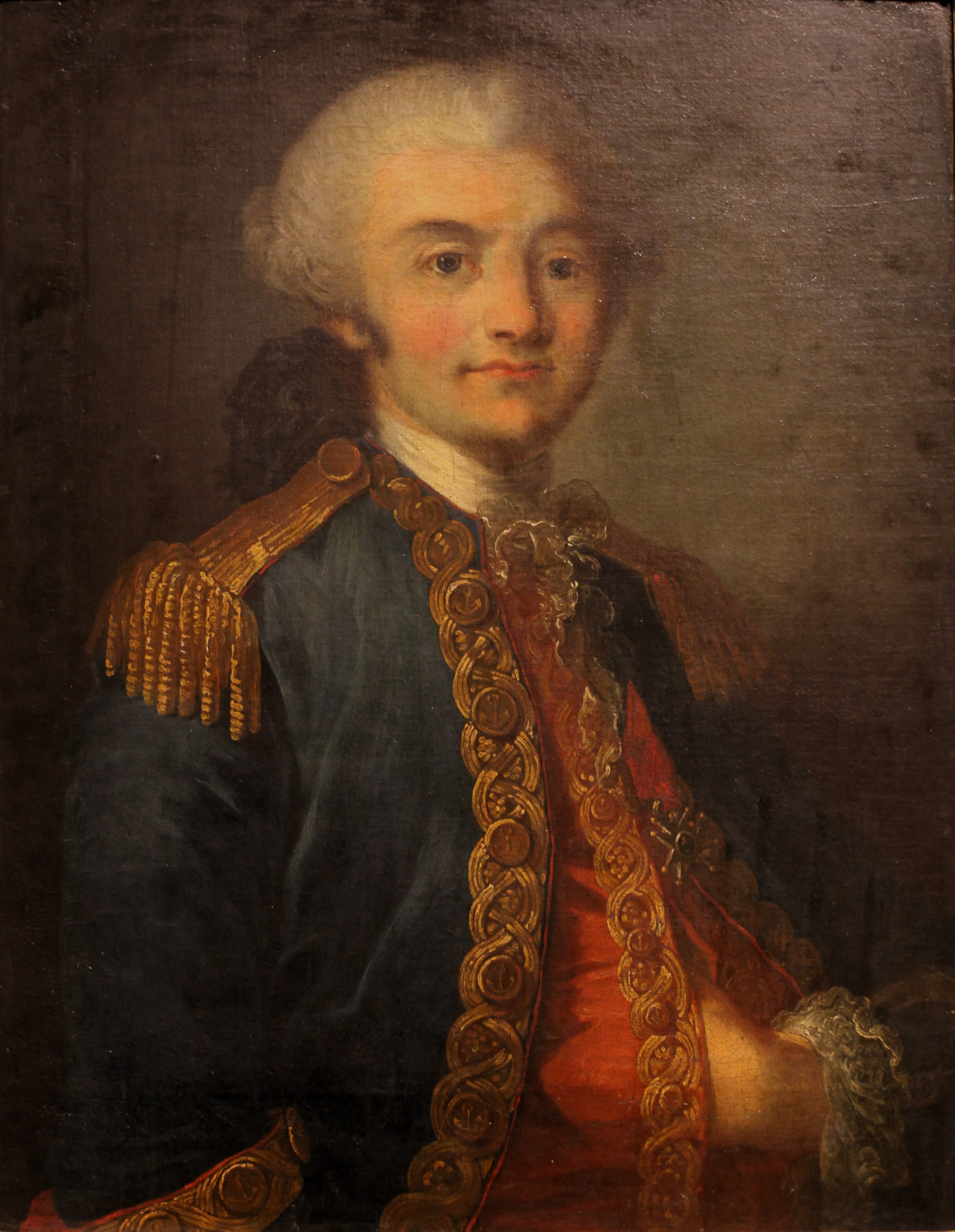
- Born: 30 September 1743
- Died: 10 August 1780 (aged 36)
- Branch: French Navy
- Conflicts: American Revolutionary War; Capture of Saint Vincent; Siege of Savannah action of 10 August 1780

Charles-Marie de Trolong du Rumain (30 September 1743 – 10 August 1780) was a French Navy officer and colonial administrator who served as the governor of Saint Vincent in 1779.

== Career ==
He took part in the War of American Independence, notably commanding the 10-gun cutter Curieuse which, along with Iphigénie, captured HMS Lively on 10 July 1778.

The next year, he directed the Capture of Saint Vincent and became colonial governor of the island.

In September 1779, he took part in the Siege of Savannah, captaining the 32-gun Chimère.

In 1780, he was in command of the frigate Nymphe. On 10 August 1780, Nymphe encountered HMS Flora off Ushant, and Trolong du Rumain was mortally wounded in the ensuing engagement.

== Citations and references ==
Citations

References

- Lacour-Gayet, Georges (1910). La marine militaire de la France sous le règne de Louis XVI. Paris: Honoré Champion. pp. 431–434.
- Roche, Jean-Michel (2005). Dictionnaire des bâtiments de la flotte de guerre française de Colbert à nos jours. Vol. 1. Group Retozel-Maury Millau. ISBN 978-2-9525917-0-6. OCLC 165892922. (1671-1870)
- Taillemite, Étienne (2002). Dictionnaire des Marins français. Tallandier. ISBN 2-84734-008-4. OCLC 606770323.
- Troude, Onésime-Joachim (1867). Batailles navales de la France (in French). Vol. 2. Challamel ainé.
