= Ulysses FitzMaurice =

British colonial administrator and planter

Lieutenant-Governor of Saint Vincent
- In office 2 December 1766 – 21 August 1772
- Monarch: George III
- Preceded by: Lauchlin McLean
- Succeeded by: Valentine Morris

Personal details
- Born: c. 1744 England
- Died: 21 August 1772

Ulysses Fitzmaurice (c. 1744 – 21 August 1772) was a British colonial administrator and planter who served as the lieutenant-governor of Saint Vincent from 1766 to 1772.

== Early life ==
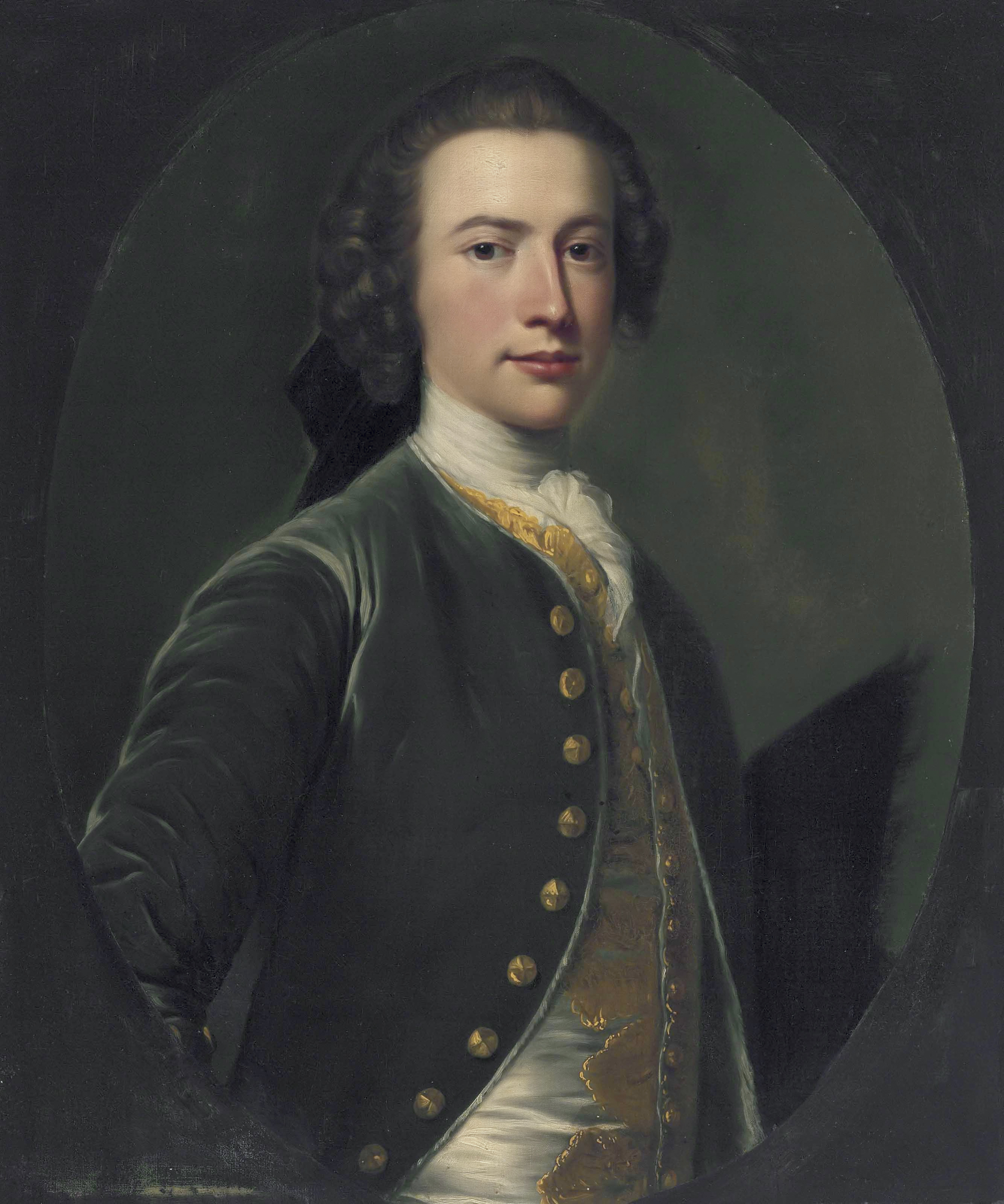
Valentine Morris, who succeeded FitzMaurice as governor of Saint Vincent after the latter's death

Ulysses Fitzmaurice was born in England c. 1744. He was reportedly the son of William FitzMaurice, 2nd Earl of Kerry, an Anglo-Irish peer and officer in the British Army from County Kerry. His mother was of German descent, and Fitzmaurice had four half-siblings: Aboan, James, Robert and John. On 2 December 1766, he began serving as the lieutenant-governor of Saint Vincent in the British West Indies, succeeding Lauchlin McLean. Beginning on 26 July 1768, FitzMaurice served as the acting governor of the Windward Islands, which had been occupied by British forces, when British Army officers Governor Robert Melvill and Lieutenant-Governor Thomas Gore were both absent from the region.

== Governorship of Grenada ==
In 1769, he attempted to appease the French population of Grenada by appointing several of them as justices of the peace in the island's six parishes. On June of the year, he returned to Saint Vincent and sent a report to London addressed to the Earl of Hillsborough, a Board of Trade official. The report detailed FitzMaurice's attempts to prevent an outbreak of violence between the British and the Garifuna people with 9 companies of the 32nd Regiment of Foot. On 15 April 1771, when new members for the Grenadian Assembly were needed, FitzMaurice appointed two Frenchmen. FitzMaurice, whose official title was "Commander-in-Chief in and over his Majesty's Southern Caribbean Islands of Grenada, the Grenadines, St. Vincent, Dominica, and Tobago", issued a formal proclamation "to preserve the said Caraibes, free mulattoes and free negroes in perfect enjoyment of their freedom".

== Death ==
FitzMaurice died on in 21 August 1772, and was succeeded as governor by Valentine Morris. FitzMaurice, who was illegitimate, died intestate as a bachelor with no apparent heirs. At the time of FitzMaurice's death, his estate consisted of Bowood, a 400 acre coffee plantation in Saint Andrew Parish, Grenada, a small leasehold estate in County Kerry and a personal estate valued at £3,456. In August 1776, a memorial to FitzMaurice was presented by the trustees of his estate. Aboan Fitzmaurice petitioned for the estate, against the advice of the Earl of Shelburne, and lost.

Government offices
Preceded by Lauchlin McLean	Lieutenant-Governor of Saint Vincent; 2 December 1766–21 August 1772	Succeeded by Valentine Morris
