= Loyal Black Rangers =

Colonial era military unit

Loyal Grenada Black Rangers
- Depiction of a West Indian Soldier (1790s) with a identical uniform to what the Black Corps were equipped with in Grenada
- Active: 1785–1836
- Disbanded: 1836
- Country: Grenada; British Empire
- Branch: Army
- Type: Infantry
- Role: Defending Grenada and hunting maroons
- Size: 1000 (1785)
- Garrison/HQ: St. George's fortification system Grand Etang
- Engagements: Fédon's Rebellion

The Loyal Black Rangers also known as the Loyal Grenada Black Rangers and the Black Corps was one of the main defence forces on the island of Grenada. It was an infantry unit made up of predominantly slaves created in the mid-1790s in Grenada, it was one of the precursors to the West India Regiments.

== History ==
In 1784, Edward Matthew brought the Carolina Corps (which had fought during the later-half of the American Revolutionary War) to Grenada to hunt slaves, the Black Corps was created off the back of the Carolina corps and was heavily inspired by it. The next year in 1785 the Black Corps was established by Matthew, with three divisions in total. One of the reasons the Black Corps was founded was to help against the growing losses in the Caribbean of European troops who died from diseases, which African-descent troops were more immune to.

=== Fédon’s Rebellion ===
The corps raised 300 extra troops during the Fédon Rebellion to bolster the inadequate St George's Coloured Militia and the small amounts of British regulars on the island. A battalion of rangers was added to the Black corps on the 1st of August 1795, creating the “Black Rangers”. The corps partook in skirmishes and an attack on a rebel encampment south of St George's between the 23rd and 25 March 1796; 2 captains and 5 rank-and-file (normal troops) were killed. The corps hunted until December 1796 for stragglers of the rebellion.

=== After the rebellion ===
After the rebellion was defeated, the Black corps was established permanently as a military force in Grenada. In early 1797 the regiment was trimmed down to 3 new companies of 80 men (with a captain and two lieutenants per company), paid for directly by the colony. The regiment was given red-coat uniforms, a standard of the British infantry forces. It was also in 1797 when the regiment was renamed to the “Loyal Grenada Black Rangers”. Alexander Houstoun (the governor of Grenada) started to integrate parts of the Black corps into the larger West India Regiments during his tenure.

The Rangers along with the Carolina Corps mainly carried out duties against runaway slaves (maroons), capturing around 556 slaves in total between the years 1815 and 1829. In the 1810s the rangers consisted of 25 privates, one captain, one sergeant and one army surgeon. The rangers were sent to various estates to quell the amount of escaping slaves, one notable example was when the Rangers discovered the negligence of Mr. Whitfield whose slaves were fleeing and dying due to poor treatment, Whitfield was convicted of negligence which was very rare for an estate owner. The corps was stationed on Richmond hill and the forts surrounding (including Fort Matthew and Fort Frederick). By 1826 the corps was stationed at Grand Etang, in the centre of the island, a key point for catching slaves.

The Corps was disbanded on the 22nd of April 1836 with the coming of emancipation for slaves.

== Uniform ==
The uniform of the regiment was near identical to most early West Indies regiment uniforms, with a red cloth jacket (a standard across the British army, a yellow coloured collar and cuffs, a white shirt and blue trousers and a hat (most likely a straw or hard-linen round hat used by militias and black regiments in the Caribbean).

== List of Commanders ==
- 1796, Captain Thomas Wade
- 1815, Captain John C. Ker
- 1829, Captain L. Otway

Three individuals are noted as having been officers or captains in the corps although their tenure dates are unknown, these men are George Garry, Alexander Reach and John Munro.
