= St George's Regiment (Grenada) =

British Military unit in Grenada

St George’s Regiment
- Active: 1763–mid 1800s
- Country: British Empire (Colony of Grenada)
- Type: Infantry including light infantry and artillery
- Role: Defending St George’s and Grenada
- Size: 365 (1796)
- Garrison/HQ: St George’s fortification system
- Engagements: American Revolutionary War; Capture of Grenada; Fédon's Rebellion; Battle of Belvedere estate

The St George's Regiment was an infantry regiment in Grenada during the colonial era, it was the primary defensive force on the island of Grenada. The unit fought in the American Revolutionary War and Fédon's rebellion. The regiment was originally part of a broad term called the “Grenada Militia” which included the later parish militias.

== History ==
The St George’s Regiment was founded after the British takeover of Grenada as the main defensive force in the capital, made up predominantly of White English troops on the island (Afro-Grenadians became present later in segregated units attached to the regiment). The regiment was said to have been well spirited and were efficient when called upon, according to a letter from the commander, Captain Gilbody. The regiment was said to have boasted the best arms and munitions on the whole island.

=== American Revolutionary War ===
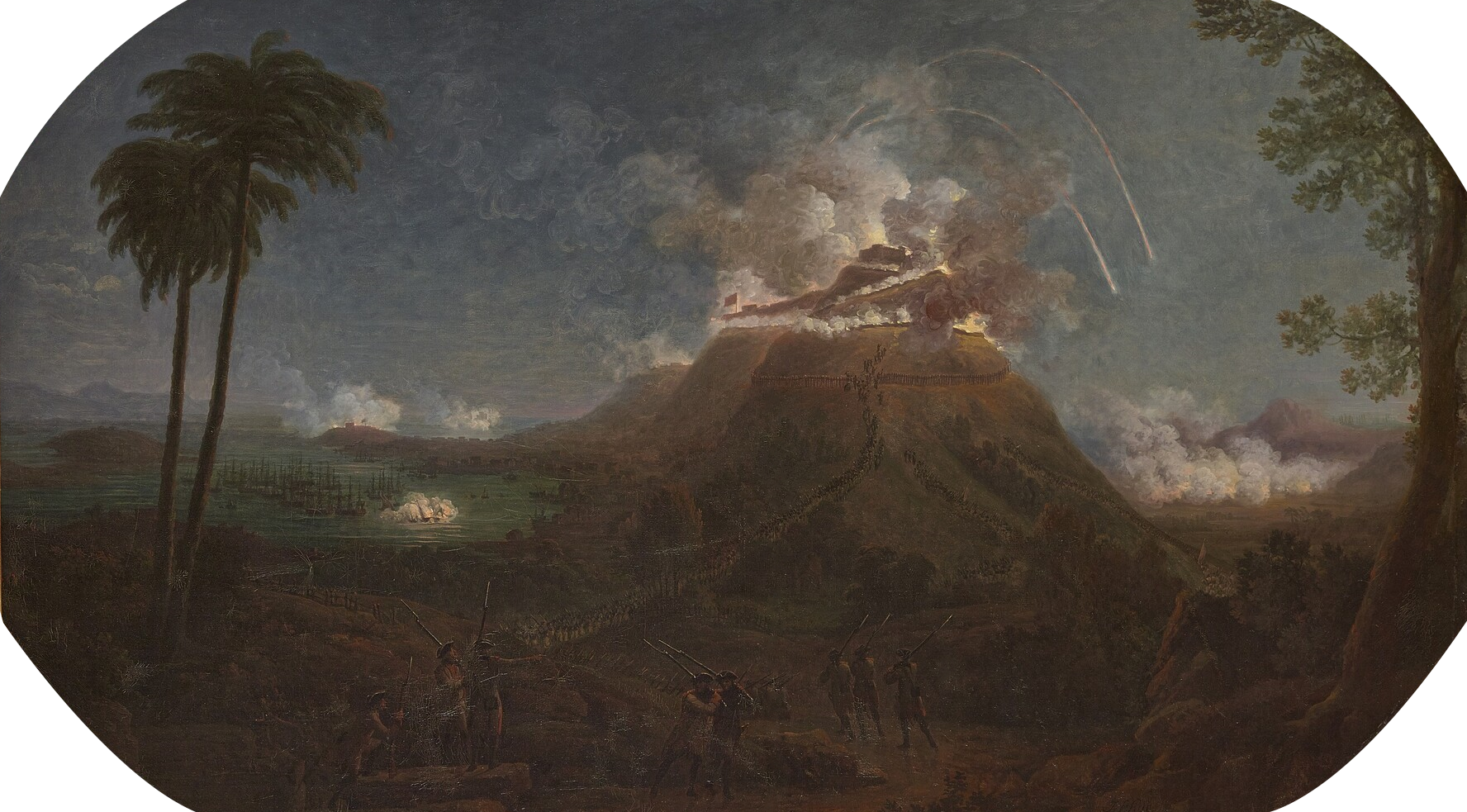
Capture of Grenada, French forces storm Hospital Hill

In 1779 the regiment (known then as the Grenada Militia) fought in the Battle of Grenada, with Colonel Williams dying during the battle. The French attacked a fort on Hospital Hill on the night of the third to the fourth of July, it took an hour for the French to capture the fort on the hill due to their overwhelming numbers, some of the British forces escaped to Fort George but quickly surrendered. The battle was a defeat for the British and the island was taken by the French, and was ruled by the French for the next 3 years.

=== Fédon’s Rebellion ===
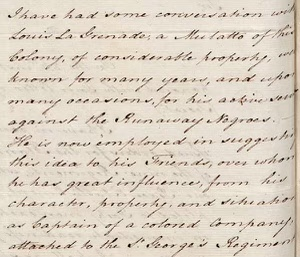
Letter regarding the foundation of the Coloured Militia as part of the St George’s Regiment

Just before the rebellion a coloured militia was created which was attached to the St George’s Regiment, founded by Louis Cazot La Grenade, the coloured militia had around 200 troops. Afro-Grenadian troops were preferred over European troops due to the large swathes of European troops that died due to tropical diseases, by the time the Fédon rebellion began, only two companies and one artillery company were made up of white British soldiers on the island, the rest were black and mulatto militias and enslaved soldiers. A couple of days before the rebellion started the government in St. George’s issued arms to the regiment in precautionary actions as reports had come in regarding a potential conspiracy of a revolt on the island.

The regiment again saw action during Fédon's rebellion which began in 1795. Parts of the regiment saw action at a skirmish at Gouyave Estate which took place on the 6th March 1795; The British administration had ordered Captain Gurdon (of the 58th Regiment but who was also commander of the St George’s regiment) and his forces (of 150 men, 40 being regulars) to march to Gouyave. They entered Gouyave on the 5th March at 4PM (16:00) to find it was devoid of insurgents (who had evacuated earlier). Gurdon was then ordered to march to Belvedere or to get a close as they could to it (whilst the St Patrick’s regiment and St. Andrew’s regiment would do the same), however Gurdon was unable to carry out his orders due to the fatigue of his men and so he remained in Gouyave.

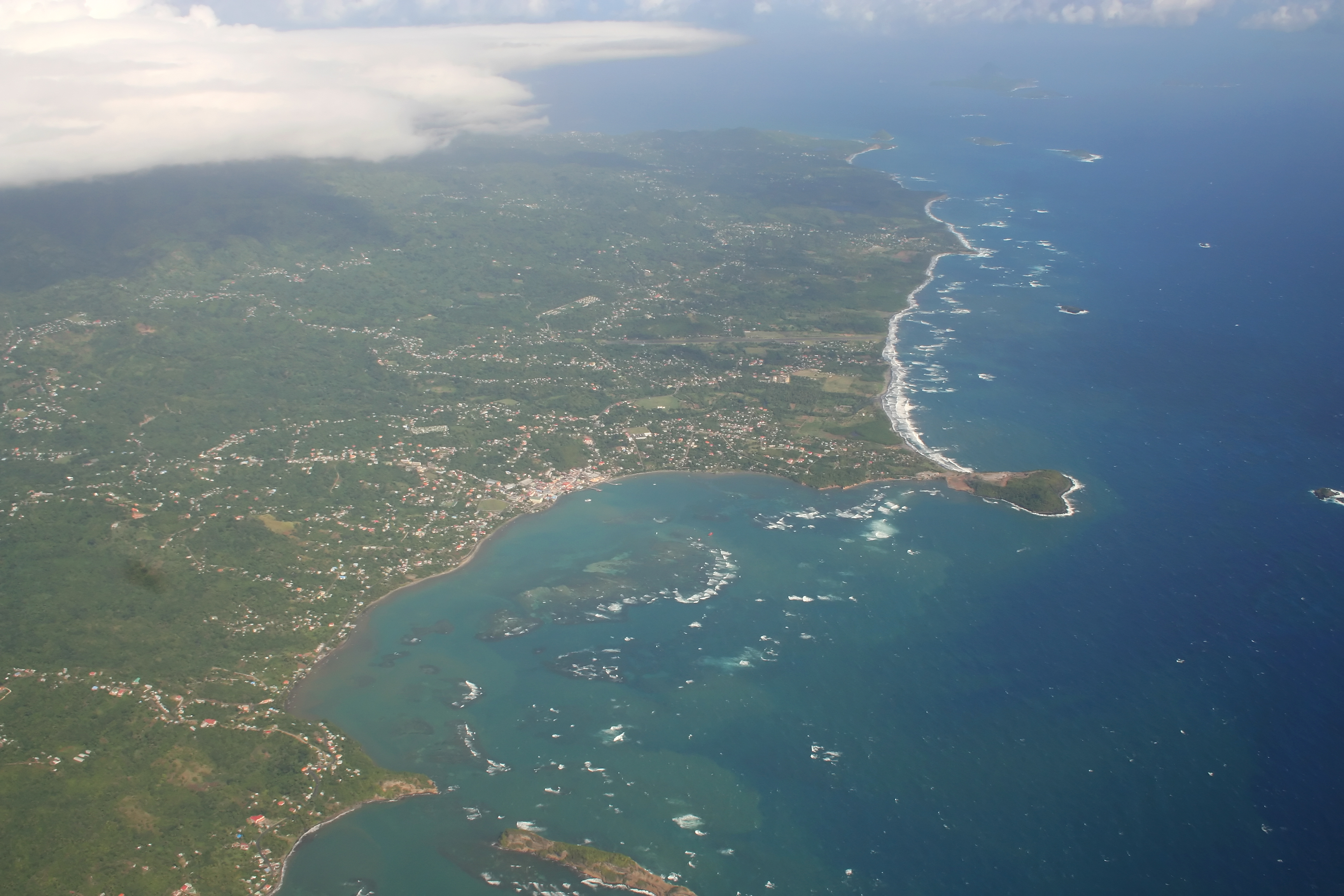
Grenville Grenada, where the regiment attacked Fédon’s troops (on a neighbouring hill just outside of the town)

Captain Gurdon and Captain Park set up sentinels and piquets (wooden stakes) in appropriate posts around the town of Gouyave and Gouyave estate. Thirty men were stationed with piquets at the dwelling-house on Gouyave estate, these thirty men were attacked by the insurgents who rushed down the hill, a firefight ensued and Captain Gurdon formed their men up to march towards the house to assist the thirty soldiers who were being attacked. The force commanded by Captain Gurdon exchanged fire with the rebels before the rebels retreated from the hill back into the forests surrounding. Then Captain Park (who commanded the Light company of the regiment) came to the aid of the rest of the regiment. The regiment took 6 casualties (4 of which were fatal casualties).

Later in March, Captain Gurdon was ordered to attack Grenville with 100 regulars and militia, they embarked on two armed vessels and were to land at Grenville Bay. 50 militiamen were stationed five miles away, ready to support. On the 2nd April he landed at Levera and marched with the 50 militiamen towards Grenville, however he discovered the enemy had cannons and were stationed on a strategic hill, which caused Gurdom’s forces to retreat. 250 men of Lieutenant-Colonel Campbell’s force under the command of Major Wright, were detached to help Gurdon’s troops. The two forces met up and returned to the base of operations five miles away from Grenville Bay. On the 7th April artillery provisions arrived at Levera to aid Gurdon’s forces with the attack, the attack went ahead, but the insurgents strategically retreated from their hill.

The Coloured militia attached to the regiment saw action at a battle called the Battle of Belvedere Estate which took place just over a month after the skirmish at Gouyave, and resulted in the execution of the governor Ninian Home.

=== After the Rebellion ===
The total size of the regiment during Fédon’s rebellion was 365 men, spread across the various units encompassing the regiment. After the rebellion the size grew to 21 officers and 389 Non-commissioned officers and privates.

In July 1801, the Grenada Militia was formally split into the parish militias (each parish having their own militia regiment). Formally creating the standalone St George’s Regiment. The units continued to be in a fair state of readiness until the capture of the last Caribbean French islands in 1810, afterward the threat of French invasion fell.

=== End of the Regiment ===
By the mid-1800s the need for parish militias had decreased and eventually the defunct militias were replaced by the Grenada Volunteer Force founded in 1878 and the Grenadian police force in 1853.

== Uniform ==
Commissioned officers: Scarlet cloth jacket with black velvet cuffs, collar and lapels. White lining with narrow silver lace at the button holes, silver buttons and epaulettes. A crimson sash, black stock tie, a white vest undergarment and white pantaloons. Black half boots and a black round hat with a black cockade and red and white feather.

NCOs and Privates: The same as the commissioned officers without the epaulettes, sashes and lace.

Artillerymen: Short blue coats with red cuffs, collar and lapels. White lining, gilt-buttons, a white vest and pantaloons, half-boots, black round hat with a black cockade and red and white feather.

Artillery Sergeants: Same uniform as the standard artillerymen with added fringed epaulettes (yellow worsted for corporals).

Artillery Officers: Same uniform as the standard artillerymen with narrow gold lace at the button holes, a gold epaulette on the right shoulder and a crimson sash.

Light Dragoons: Before 1796– Waist-length sleeved waistcoat worn below a sleeveless waist-length jacket (known as a “shell”) both made of dark blue cloth with white braided (silver for officers), facing colour (sometimes white) collars and cuffs. Each shoulder had a blue cloth wing. White leather breeches with black cuffed boots with steel spurs were worn. For headgear dragoons were equipped with a black leather caterpillar crested helmet (a Tarleton helmet).

Light Dragoons: After 1796– Light grey jacket, white breaches with black cloth gaiters (white mosquito trousers also used), the shell wasn’t worn, replaced with just the sleeved waistcoat, the headgear was a add from tin with a light crest and a horsehair ornament (similar right a small Shako with a small feather).

== Order of battle ==
In 1795 during Fédon’s rebellion, the unit constituted as follows:

- 1st Battalion St. George’s Regiment (The first Battalion had two companies of Artillery and one infantry company)
- 2nd Battalion St. George’s Regiment (Light infantry)
- 3rd Battalion St George’s Regiment (a detachment of the Grenada Light dragoons)
- 4th Battalion St George’s Regiment (Coloured Militia)

== List of commanders ==
- 1778, Captain Gilbody
- 1779–1784, Lieutenant-Colonel Black
- 1795–1796, Captain Brampton Gurdon and Captain Park
- 1802, Capt. John Miller Esq.
