= Tempe, Grenada =

Village in Grenada

Coordinates: 12°03′23″N 61°44′16″W

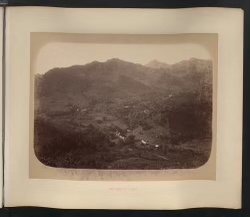
Vale of Tempe

Tempe (also spelt as Tempé) is a village in Saint George Parish, Grenada. Tempe is situated in the hills of the parish and is near to Mt. Parnassus and Mt. Gay, other villages in the region. Tempe is situated behind Fort Matthew and Fort Frederick, two famous forts in Grenada. The village is 90 metres above sea level.

There is a river in Tempe known as Tempé River. The village also has a playing field.
