= Tempi =

Tempi may refer to:

- Tempo, plural tempi, the speed of a musical piece
- Tempi (municipality), a municipality in Larissa, Thessaly, Greece
- TEMPI syndrome, a novel orphan disease

== See also ==
- Palazzo Tempi, a palace in Florence, Tuscany, Italy
- Tempe (disambiguation)
- Tempeh, a food made from fermented soybeans
- Tempo (disambiguation), other uses of tempo, some of which may be pluralised to tempi
- Tempy, a locality in Victoria, Australia
