= St George's Coloured Militia =

4th Battalion, St George’s Regiment (St George’s Coloured militia)
- Active: 1790/1792 – c. 1838
- Country: British Empire
- Branch: Army
- Type: Infantry
- Role: Defending St George’s
- Size: Abt. 200
- Part of: St George’s Regiment
- Garrison/HQ: Fort George’s
- Engagements: Fédon's rebellion; Battle of Belvedere estate

The St George's Coloured Militia (specifically the 4th Battalion of the St George's regiment) was the main coloured militia in the town of St. George's during the colonial era. It was part of the larger St George's Regiment (which consisted of regulars and a light company) It was founded by Captain Louis Cazot La Grenade in the early 1790s, who led the unit until about 1798. The regiment was made up of freedmen and mulattos as opposed to slaves (which was common in other regiments).

== History ==
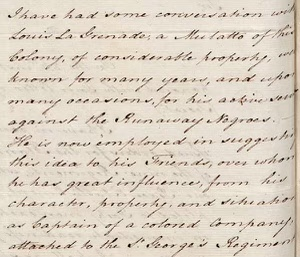
A letter regarding Louis Cazot La Grenade's recommendation of the founding of a Coloured Militia (Circa. 1790-1792)

The militia was founded on the recommendation of Louis Cazot La Grenade in January 1792, (although another source says it existed in late 1790) the founding of Colonial militias made up of slaves and freedmen was becoming a prevalent custom around the Caribbean and other colonies; for example, in the late 1780s, Governor Edward Matthew founded the Black Corps in Grenada for use in defending the island, based on the Carolina Corps. Afro-Grenadian troops were seen as better equipped for the diseases and climate of the Caribbean and were prioritised over White troops (who often died in those conditions). The St George's regiment was the only regiment on the island of Grenada which bore good armament and supplies (weapons and munitions). In the year 1790 the Black Corps was mainly partaking in laborious roles as opposed to military roles, in the same year Louis Cazot recommended the creation of a company of freed black and mulatto men, however this was stopped by the colonial secretary. However it appears the militia came into existence shortly after (by 1792).

In 1793 an epidemic of Yellow Fever spread from Grenada throughout the Caribbean. The head of the armed forces in Grenada, General Oliver Nicolls was obliged to create two companies of black troops to fill the casualties sustained by the white troops he originally had (as white troops were less equipped to the disease and died in larger numbers), firmly cementing the St George's coloured militia as an armed force and paving the way for the use of slave and freed troops in the Caribbean.

=== Fédon's Rebellion ===
The coloured militia was a trusted institution in Grenada, and governor Ninian Home allowed them to keep their arms at the start of Fédon’s rebellion whilst all other free coloured people what their arms usage suspended.

During Fédon's Rebellion, the defences consisted of around 1100 men mainly defending the capital St. George's and the forts surrounding (less than 200 of these men were standard regulars). The Militia (which numbered around 200) had learnt about the revolutions in France and the threat of a French invasion of the island (which had previously been French) was a very real possibility. The town of St George's (which was defended by a group of “Black” armed groups called the Black Light Dragoons, the Black Pioneers and Artificers and the Black Corps) was attacked and the defending troops were forced back into the main defences of the town. Although they fought loyally they were not able to break the rebels’ hold of the island, and for a majority of the conflict the militias stayed in the capital, only making small excursions into enemy held land. One of these excursions was the Battle of Belvedere estate, a skirmish between the Coloured militia led by Louis Cazot La Grenade against Julien Fédon and Joachim Philip. By the end of the rebellion (which was a British victory) over 2000 slaves and freed individuals were serving in military roles in the various units.

=== After the Rebellion ===
The West India Regiments were firmly created after the rebellion in Grenada (although the first iterations of the regiment were founded in early 1795 by the governor of the Leeward Islands, Sir John Vaughan), firstly made up of the Grenadian units, and the Carolina Corps among other early black military units across the Caribbean. Parts of the Black Corps was (on the orders of the acting governor of Grenada, Alexander Houstoun) integrated into the new West India Regiments (an idea of General Ralph Abercromby, who was pleased at the courage and loyalty the Grenadian militias fought with during the rebellion). The St. George's regiment remained as a standing army in Grenada after the revolt, although numbers were increased before being decreased throughout the decades.

In 1826 the regiment mustered once a month in the capital for drills and occasionally parades, a visitor to the isle called Frederic William Naylor Bayley noted that the Grenada Militia (referring to the coloured militia) noted that;

I will say, in justice to the Grenada Militia, that they appear upon the ground where they assemble, in better condition than any colonial body I have seen in the other islands, and this, perhaps, arises from the circumstance of their being principally composed of respectable young men of color, who take a pride in being well and decently equipped; the uniform of the officers is both splendid and expensive, and I have never yet seen a shabby commander at the head of any company in the corps.

— Frederic William Naylor Bayley, Four Year’s residence in the West Indies, Page 506

The regiment eventually morphed into the larger St George’s Regiment after emancipation (After Fédon’s rebellion most people in Grenada were Afro-Grenadians, so the need for a specific coloured militia declined, and by the end of the napoleonic wars the threat of invasion also declined). By the mid-1800s the individual parish militias had practically ceased as regional forces and by 1878 a new force was created, known as the Volunteer army.

== Uniform ==
Commissioned officers: Scarlet cloth jacket with black velvet cuffs, collar and lapels. White lining with narrow silver lace at the button holes, silver buttons and epaulettes. A crimson sash, black stock tie, a white vest undergarment and white pantaloons. Black half boots and a black round hat with a black cockade and red and white feather.

NCOs and Privates: The same as the commissioned officers without the epaulettes, sashes and lace.

== List of Commanders ==
Commanders of the Regiment were as follows:

- November 1790/January 1792 –1798?, Captain. Louis Cazot La Grenade (1733–1808)
- 1798– Capt. John C. Coxall
- — April 1828, Capt. Louis La Grenade II (1776–1850)
- 1828–1838, Lieutenant-Colonel Ambrose Hayling (1790–1854)
