= Drill Yard, St George's, Grenada =

Historic building in Grenada

The Drill Yard is a historic building in St. George's, Grenada, located on Young Street, named after Governor William Young.

== History ==
The Drill yard was constructed during the French ownership of Grenada, where it functioned as a judicial court and gaol (prison), it was the first court on the island and was referred to as the ‘Palais de justice’, and it was designed by engineer Vincent Hoüel (1689–1754). It was part of the ‘Place du Palais’, the major civic area of St. George’s. The building was connected to the Fort George complex. The building continued to be used in the same roles after the British takeover in 1763. The Drill yard was expanded in 1767 and later in 1855. The building held prisoners after Fédon’s rebellion including leaders of the revolt. There was also a treadmill used for the punishment of slaves and apprentices between 1827 and 1838. In 1880 male prisoners were moved to the newer and larger Richmond Hill Prison, female prisoners following in 1904. The name ‘drill yard’ derives from its usage as a military training ground for the Grenada volunteer force during WW1.

In 2011 the building caught fire and 2012 it was acquired by the National Insurance Scheme of Grenada as payment for government debts. On July 26 2026, the Grenada National Trust secured a temporary halt to the demolition to carry out heritage and preservation works.
