= Alexandre Cazeau de Roumillac =

French economist

Alexandre Cazeau de Roumillac (1727–1796) was a French economist and planter in the Caribbean.

== Early life and family ==
Born on September 5, 1727, in Saint-François, Basse-Terre, Guadeloupe, Jean Alexandre Charles Cazeau de Roumillac came from a family originally from Angoulême. His father, Jean-François Cazaud du Breuil (died in Angoulême in 1739), was a lawyer, counselor to the King, and commissioner at the Palais in the Bordeaux Parliament. His mother, Marthe Catherine de Bologne (died in Angoulême in 1744), was a Creole from Guadeloupe, the sister of Georges de Bologne Saint-Georges, and dame de Roumillac. There is a theory that Alexandre Cazeau was the older half-brother of Louis Cazot “LaGrenade” who was a businessman from Grenada, there are documents which mention both men in unison. Cazeau’s parents married in the Saint-Pierre Church in Bordeaux on February 16, 1724.

Alexandre Cazeau first served as an officer in the dragoons regiment of Surgères starting in 1745 under the name Cazaud de Roumilhac, claiming to have participated in the War of Austrian Succession. He resigned in 1752 and married Calixte Sylvie Benoît, daughter of François Benoît des Essards, a wealthy silk merchant from Angoulême, and Jeanne Fauconnier, on September 19 of the same year at the Saint-André Church in Angoulême. Together they had a son before their marriage, Jean-François Cazaud de Roumillac (born in Angoulême on August 21, 1756, baptized at the Saint-André Church in Angoulême), and two daughters, Marie-Marthe de Cazaux (born in Angoulême on June 16, 1757, baptized at the Saint-André Church in Angoulême) and Mélanie-Sophie de Cazaux (born in 1763).

== Farming career ==
Attracted by the "Isles," he arrived in 1753 in Grenada, then a French colony. Upon his arrival, Alexandre Cazeau settled as a planter in the northeast of the island, at the foot of the Lavera mountain, in the parish of Sauteurs. The plantation, which employed both indentured servants and slaves, produced some cacao, coffee, cotton, but mostly sugar. Cazeau, passionate about agronomy and philosophy, attempted to put his theories into practice by experimenting with new farming methods and treating his slaves with "humanity rarely seen at the time."

In his Essay on the Art of Cultivating Cane and Extracting Sugar, published in London in 1781, he stated: "Without speaking as a legislator, as a Christian, as a philosopher, but simply as a farmer, it is bad economics to spend a lot of money to buy new ones (slaves) when, with a little money and some indulgence, you can keep the old ones who are much better [...] You can make the same amount of sugar with many fewer slaves, but by treating them with more kindness."

After several trips back and forth to France, he settled on the island in 1757 with his son Jean-François and daughter Marie-Marthe. To safeguard his interests, he sided with the British when they took possession of the island in 1759 and changed his nationality. In 1767, he was appointed representative of the French of the island to King George III.

Having made his fortune, Cazeau returned to Europe in 1777, dividing his time between London and Paris. He published pamphlets on the sugar industry, which enabled him to join the Royal Society of London on April 13, 1780. Since Grenada had been returned to France in 1779, he advocated on behalf of British settlers to King Louis XVI.

In 1782, he joined the Masonic lodge Saint-Jean de la Vertu Persécutée in Avignon.

== Pseudo-Marquis ==
In order to gain more prestige in the salons he frequented, Cazeau invented a connection to the old Gascon family of du Gout de Cazaux and claimed the title of Marquis de Casaux. It was under this assumed title that he signed the marriage contract for his daughter on December 18, 1782, with the authentic Marquis Louis-Sauveur de Roux, aged 39. A few weeks later, the newlyweds were already in the process of separation. Fearing that his genealogical deception would be uncovered, Cazeau secretly fled Avignon on April 26, 1783, with his pregnant daughter. They settled in Rome, where she died in September, giving birth to a son, Alexandre-Marie-Marthe. Cazeau left the child with a nurse, who later returned him to his legal father, the Marquis de Roux, in 1784. During his flight to Italy, Cazeau managed to be received at the Agricultural Academy of Florence.

== Economic writing ==
After taking refuge in London for several years, he took advantage of his knowledge of the sugar industry to write an Essay on the Art of Cultivating Cane and Extracting Sugar (1786). He then returned to France in 1788 and became known by publishing several works with a physiocratic tendency. He also wrote several political economy essays, advocating for free trade and the abolition of the territorial tax (1790), as well as the establishment of a Constitution (1789) based on the British model.

Recognized as one of the thinkers of the liberal monarchy, he befriended Honoré-Gabriel Riqueti de Mirabeau and directly participated in writing some of his speeches. After Mirabeau's death in 1791 and the fall of the monarchy, he settled in London in 1792. During this time, he participated with Arthur Young in the writing and French translation of Travels in France: during the years 1787, 88, 89, and 90, which provided valuable insights into rural France. He died in London in 1796.

== Gallery ==
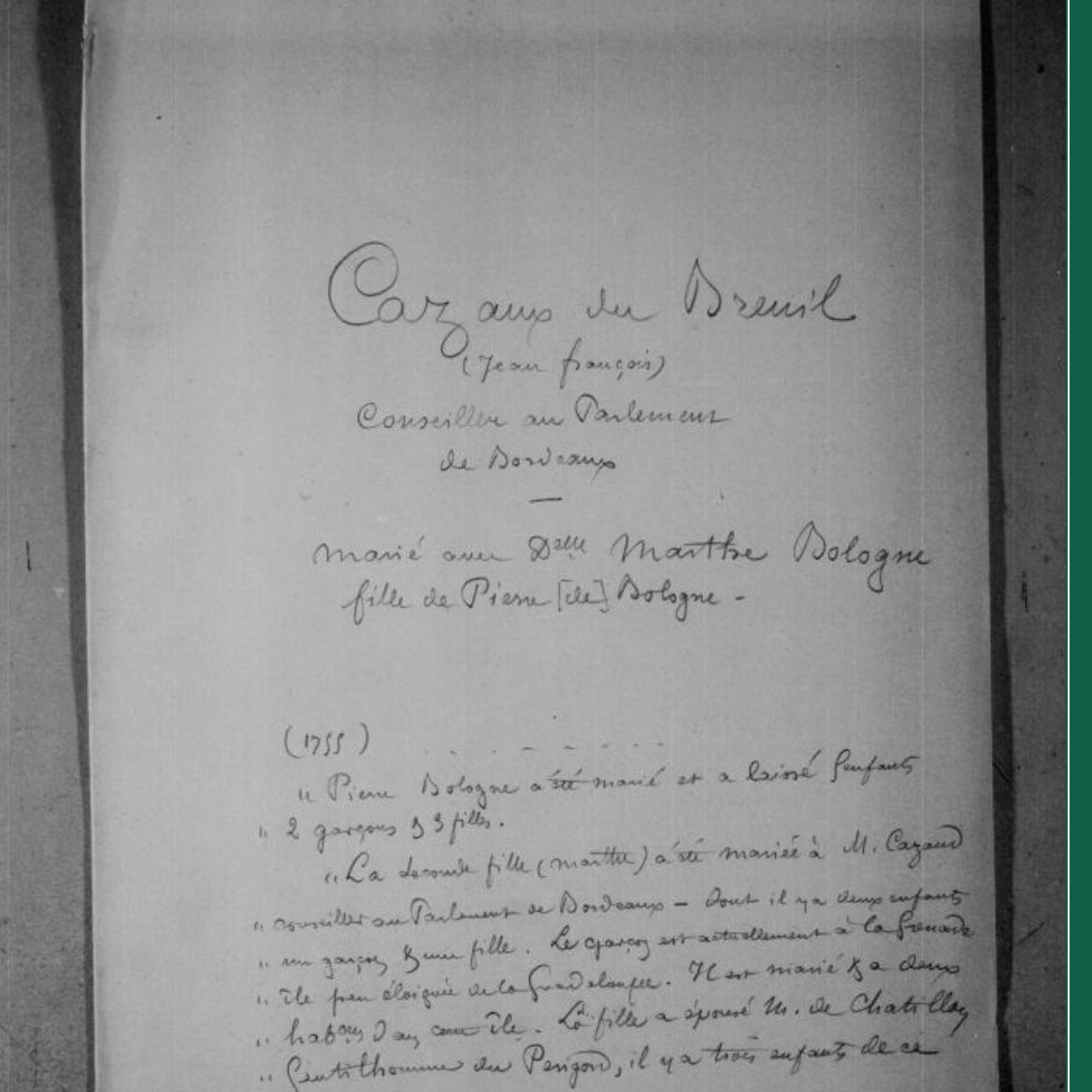
Document mentioning De Roumillac’s parents (and it has a passing mention of De Roumillac, although he isn’t named).

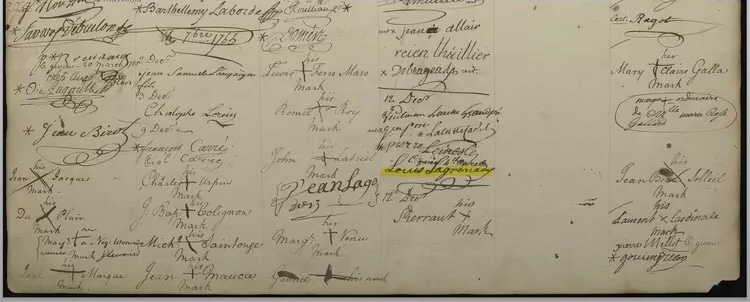
Allegiance to the English Crown, De Roumillac’ name is at the top of the Third row, along with Louis Cazot La Grenade (who might’ve been his half-brother)

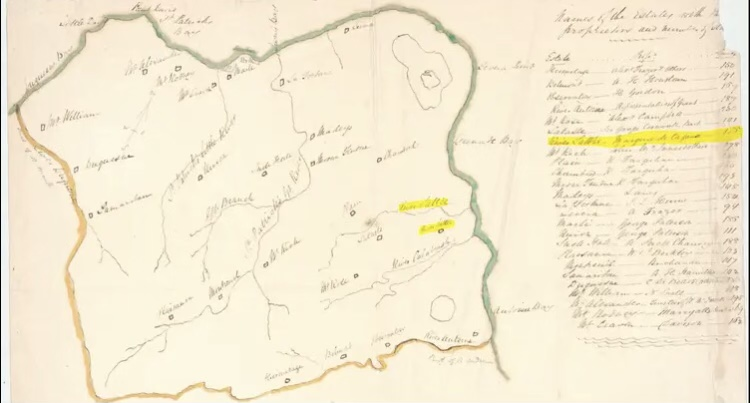
River Sallee estate owned by Cazeau in Saint Patrick parish

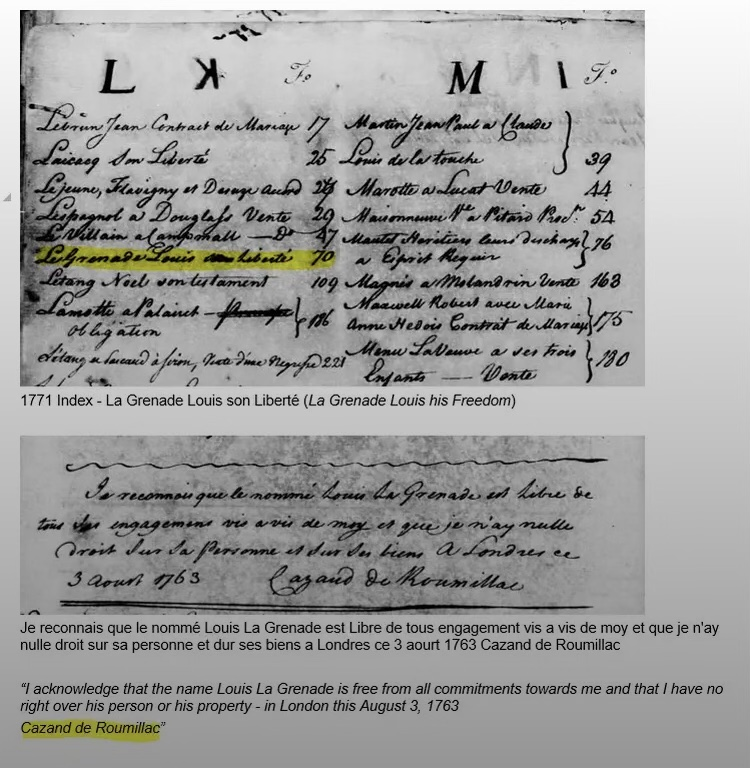
De Roumillac renouncing ownership of Louis Cazot La Grenade’s possession (perhaps the estate of LaGrenade was jointly owned by De Roumillac, possibly due to them being half-siblings).
