= Mount Cenis, Grenada =

Village and estate in Grenada

Mount Cenis. Mount Cenis Estate
- Village/Estate
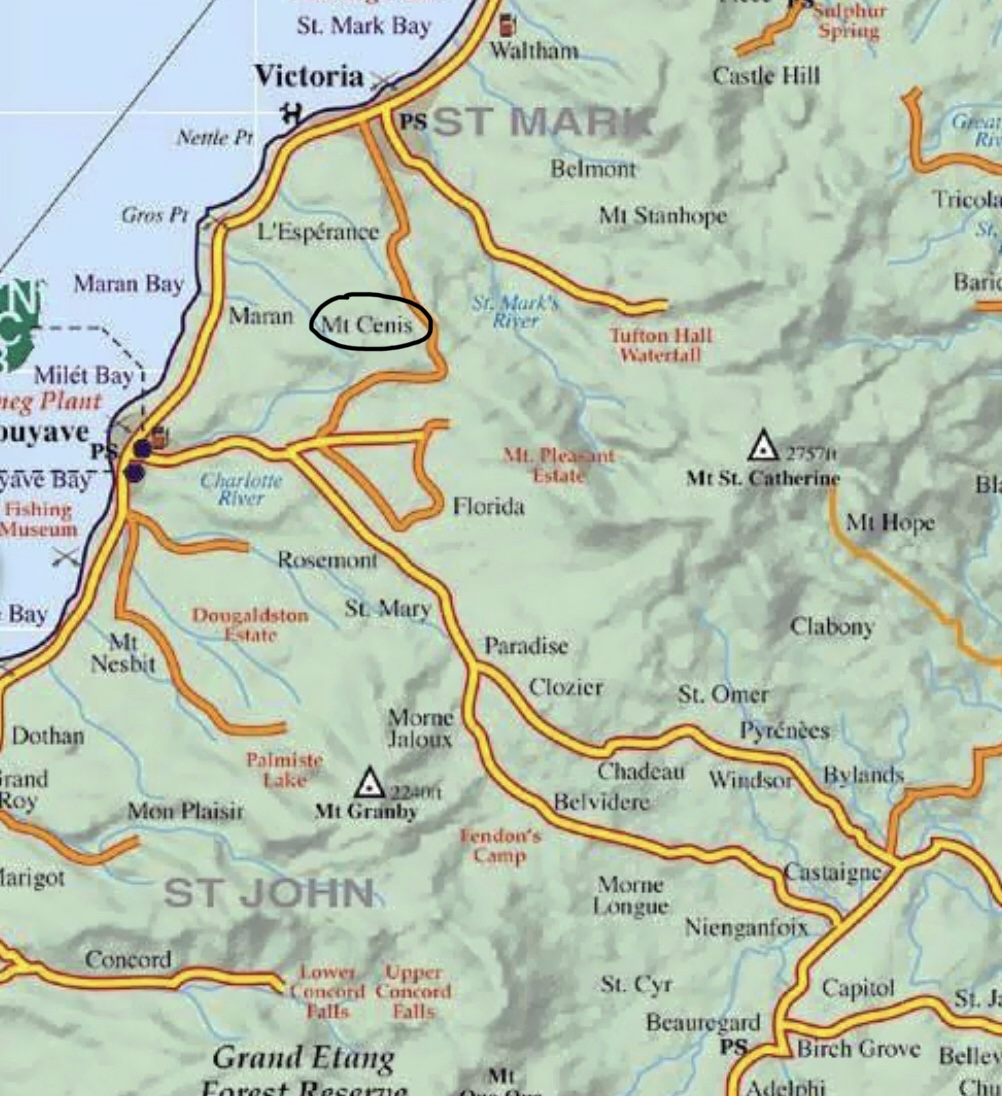
- Map of Northern Grenada, showing Mount Cenis.
- Etymology: Perhaps named after Mont Cenis in France
- Country: Grenada
- Parish: Saint Mark Parish, Grenada
- Founded by: Perhaps René Maxime Clozier

Mount Cenis is a village and former estate in Grenada, situated in Saint Mark Parish. The village is 329 metres above sea level and is in a mountainous part of the island, it is near Maran, Mt. Saint Catherine and Tufton Hall waterfall.

== History ==
The first owner of Mount Cenis estate was René Maxime Clozier and his wife Duval Clozier de Sainte-Marie. René Maxime Clozier was the uncle to Marie Franceois Clozier, wife of Louis Cazot LaGrenade. The Clozier family were a landowning family in St Mark and St John Parish, who presumably migrated to Grenada when it was under French rule. René Maxime Clozier owned the land between 1817 (or perhaps earlier) until 1835 (although it’s possible he still owned the land after slavery was abolished). At the time of emancipation the estate held 18 enslaved people, and Clozier was paid 524 pounds, 12 shillings and 7 pence for the loss of these slaves.
