= Louis Cazot La Grenade =

Grenadian landowner and military leader (1733–1808)

Louis Cazot LaGrenade
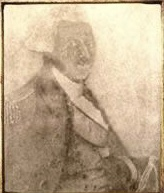
- Depiction of LaGrenade dating between 1790 and 1808
- Born: Around 1733; Grenada
- Died: 1st September 1808; Morne Jaloux, Grenada
- Resting place: Morne Jaloux
- Citizenship: French (1733-1785) British (1785-1808) Naturalised British subject
- Occupations: Captain in the St George's Coloured Militia, businessman and landowner
- Years active: 1765–1808
- Employer: British Army (1790–1798)
- Known for: Founding the LaGrenade family and company, and creating the coloured militia.
- Title: Captain
- Predecessor: Position established
- Successor: Louis La Grenade II (his son)
- Spouse: Marie Franceois Clozier (together C. 1797-1808)
- Partner: Marie-Marthe (Marie-Matty) (together 1770-)
- Children: 9 including his son Louis La Grenade II
- Father: (Perhaps) Jean-François Cazaud de Breuil
- Relatives: Perhaps Alexandre Cazeau de Roumillac (Half-brother) LaGrenade family including Cecile La Grenade
- Family: LaGrenade

Louis Cazot La-Grenade also known as Louis Cazot de La Grenade and Louis LaGrenade I (1733 - 1 September 1808) was a landowner, business man, military leader, slave owner and politician in Grenada. Louis Cazot was born in Grenada when it was a French colony, and was perhaps the Paternal half-brother of Alexandre Cazeau de Roumillac.

== Biography ==
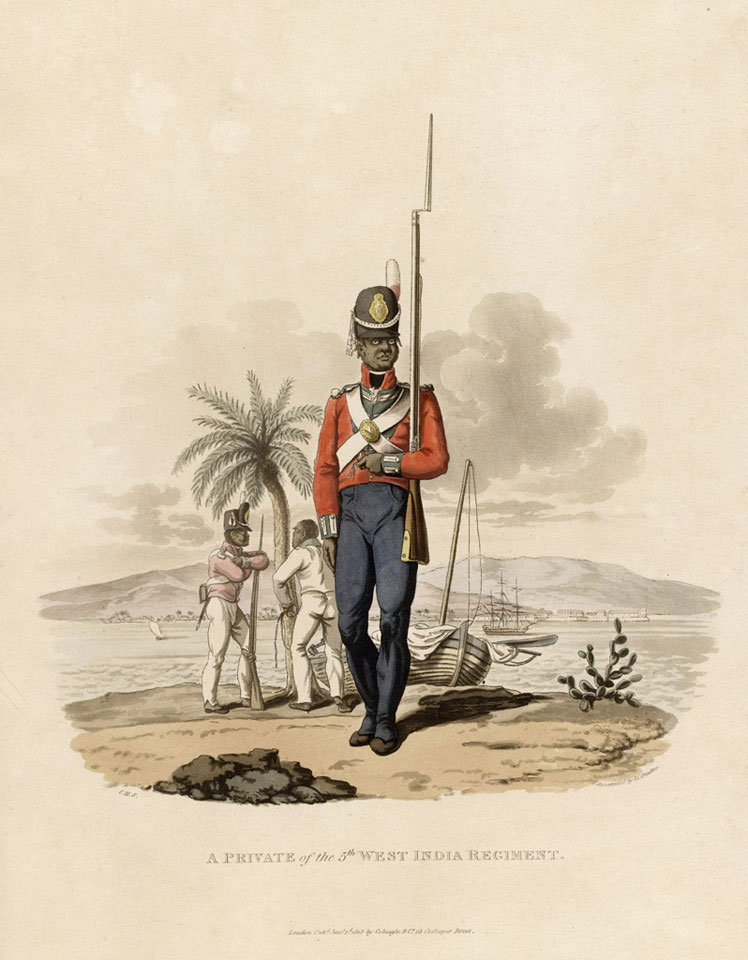
Uniform of a British coloured soldier (similar to Cazot’s troops)

Louis Cazot appeared as a figure around 1763-1765 in Grenada when he was noted as having converted to Protestantism and had sworn allegiance to the English crown. Cazot began a trading company around this time and in 1773 founded a Liqueur company with a recipe that was said to have been given to him by a Dutch trader who wanted a free trip to the island of Grenada, in return the Dutchman gave Cazot the recipe to his family’s liqueur. He became a naturalised British subject on the 9th of August 1785. He founded the St George’s coloured militia in the early 1790s using freedmen and slaves as the troops. The Colonial secretary Edward Matthew nominated La Grenade to be given the king’s sanction to wear a gold medal with his black ribbon (which he received earlier for distinction in the service of capturing runaway slaves). In 1791, Cazot was one of the four men who wrote a letter to George Washington and congress, requesting asylum due to the treatment of mulattos on the island of Grenada, however the letter was ignored. In 1792 Louis Cazot among other Mulattos of the colony reconfirmed their allegiance to the British crown.

During the 1795-1796 revolt in Grenada, Louis Cazot La Grenade fought against Julien Fedon on the side of the British. He led the St George’s Coloured militia and defended the city against the assault by Fedon. On 8 April 1795 the coloured militia (which numbered around 200) led by Cazot attacked the rebel camp, however that attacked proved unsuccessful. For his contributions in the militia (before and during the revolt), Louis Cazot was made Captain in the British army.

He died in 1808 at the age of 75, and was buried in Morne Jaloux in Grenada. His land holdings went to his son Louis La Grenade II (February 1776 - 23 September 1850).

His direct descendant Sybil La-Grenade founded the De La Grenade industries which sells the liqueur supposedly given to Louis Cazot LaGrenade in 1773, among other products.

== Relatives ==
Louis Cazot married/was in a relationship with a woman called Marie-Marthe (Marie-Matty). Together they had seven children who were;

- Sophia La Grenade ?
- Marie-Marthe (considered the oldest child of Cazot) 1770- ?
- Peggy La Grenade
- Adelaide La Grenade 1772- ?
- Margaret La Grenade
- Louis La Grenade II 1776-1850
- Louisa Octrique La Grenade 1778-1847

Louis Cazot also appears to have had two children with a woman by the name of Marie Franceois Clozier (The daughter of landowner Narcis Clozier who was the brother of René Maxime Clozier, owner of Mount Cenis estate) These children were;

- Julienne La Grenade 1798- ?
- Emile La Grenade

Louis LaGrenade II was also a captain in the St. George’s Coloured Militia, succeeding his father after his death. He formally resigned in 1828.

Multiple famous Grenadians including Maurice Bishop, Cecile La Grenade, Marise La Grenade-Lashley (author of Mwen Ka Alé), Lewis Hamilton and perhaps Dickon Mitchell and Keith Mitchell are descended from Louis Cazot La Grenade.

== Gallery ==
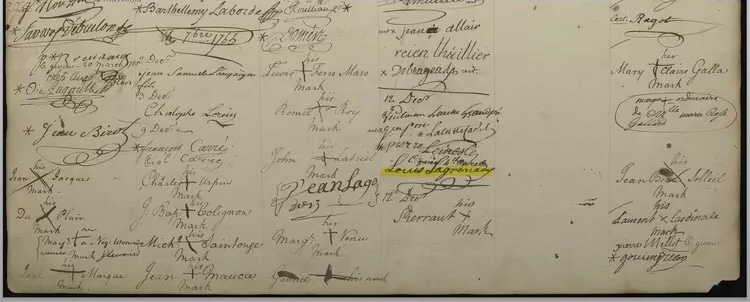
Allegiance to the English Crown, mentioning Louis Cazot LaGrenade and perhaps his half-brother Cazeau De Roumillac

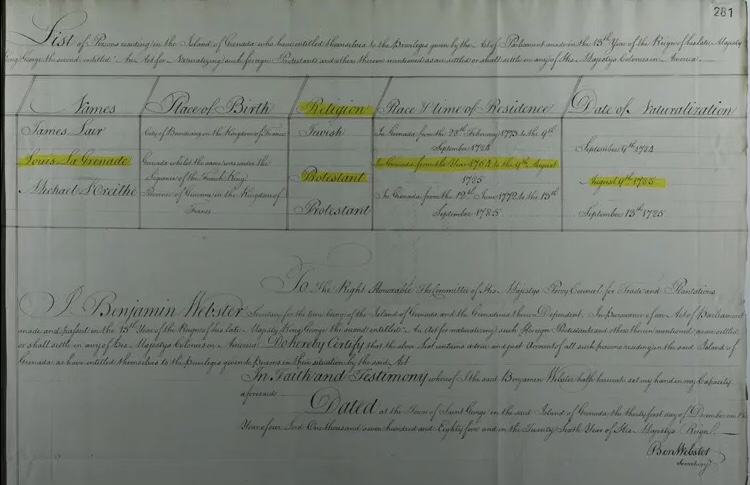
Naturalisation of LaGrenade in 1765

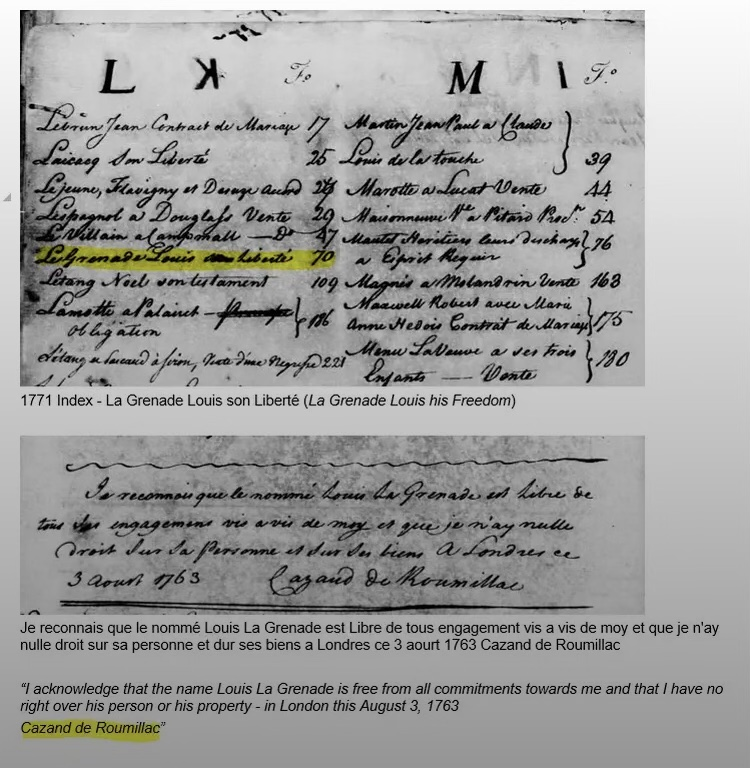
Alexandre Cazeau de Roumillac renouncing his ownership of Louis Cazot LaGrenade’s possessions, perhaps indicating that they jointly owned land.

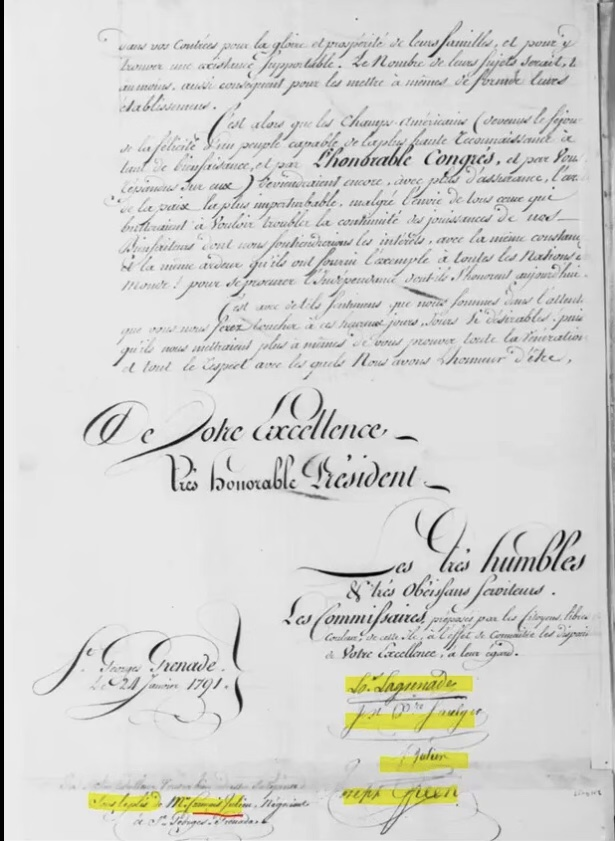
Letter from LaGrenade and other planters to the American congress and George Washington in 1791

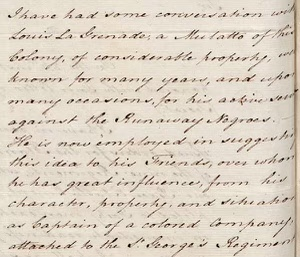
LaGrenade’s suggestion of a coloured militia, (written by another person who is writing a letter to someone else regarding the idea). C. 1790
