= Ambrose Hayling =

Grenadian politician and officer

- Born: 1790; Grenada
- Died: 1852 (aged 61–62); Grenada
- Occupations: Lieutenant Colonel of the St George's Coloured Militia (1828–1838) and Council member
- Title: Lieutenant-Colonel
- Term: 1828–1838
- Predecessor: Louis La Grenade II
- Successor: Unknown

Ambrose Hayling (1790–1854) was a “free-coloured” Grenadian military leader and politician during the colonial era.

== Biography ==
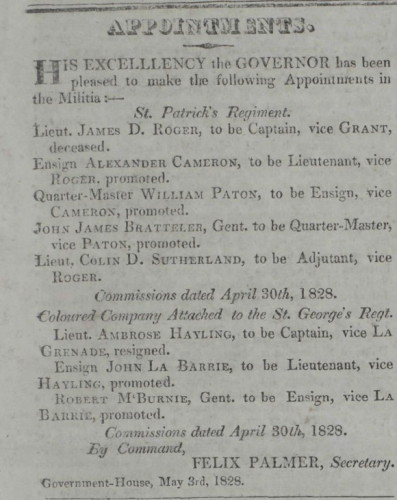
The Grenada Gazette, mentioning Ambrose Hayling near the bottom

Hayling was born in Grenada in 1790 to Caleb Hayling and Henrietta Dyer. He was one of the signatories on a petition dated to 1823 which was to “His Majesty’s Commissioners of Inquiry into the administration of Justice in the colonies” into better treatment towards mulattos, the main grievance of this petition was the overturning of the “Judge Smith’s Collection” a set of laws which grouped mulattos into the same group as slaves and handed out harsh punishments towards them.

Between 1826 and 1829, Ambrose Hayling acquired some slaves due to his marriage to Cinderella Commisiong, daughter of a Genoese sail-maker called Domingo Comissione. He owned three estates in Grenada, two with unknown names and one called Woburn Estate; Hayling owned about 33 slaves and was awarded a total of £886, 10 shillings and 11 pence in compensation for the loss of his slaves during emancipation. Hayling served as the lieutenant-colonel in the St George's Coloured Militia from the resignation of Louis La Grenade II in 1828 to around 1838. He was also part of the governing body of the “Society for the education of the poor” which aimed to educate Grenadian children during the post-abolition era, Hayling also served as one of the directors of the Colony hospital.

Ambrose Hayling was part of the Freemasons and served as an Inner Guard in the organisation which had a lodge in Grenada called Caledonia Lodge. He also served on the council of Grenada along with Louis La Grenade II, and both men were styled with the “Hon.” prefix.

== Family ==
Ambrose Hayling married Cinderella Commisiong and they had two daughters, Eliza Anna Hayling who married Robert William Guthrie, and Margaret Hayling who married Peter Balfour Esq. in the capital St George's in the late 1840s.
