= Chesapeake raid =

American Revolutionary War campaign

Coordinates: 38°3′N 76°11′W

The Chesapeake raid was an American Revolutionary War campaign by Royal Navy forces under the command of Commodore Sir George Collier and British troops led by Major-general Edward Mathew. Between 10 May and 24 May 1779 these forces raided economic and military targets up and down the Chesapeake Bay. The speed with which the British moved caught many of the bay's communities by surprise, so there was little to no resistance. The British destroyed economically important supplies of tobacco and coal, and destroyed naval ships, port facilities, and storehouses full of military supplies.
