= Tempe =

Tempe may refer to:

== Places ==
- Vale of Tempe, Greece
  - Tempe (municipality)
- Tempe, Arizona, United States
- Tempe, New South Wales, a suburb in Sydney, Australia
- Tempe, Grenada, a village in Saint George Parish
- Lake Tempe, Indonesia
- Tempe, Indonesia, an urban district in South Sulawesi on the shore of Lake Tempe, with Sengkang as its central town.
- Tempe, Bloemfontein, South Africa, an area outside Bloemfontein, home to various military bases and units

== See also ==
- Tempa, West Virginia, which may be named for the Vale of Tempe (see above)
- Tempeh, a traditional soy product, commonly known as tempe
