= Grand Etang (Grenada) =

Lake of Grenada

Grand Etang Lake
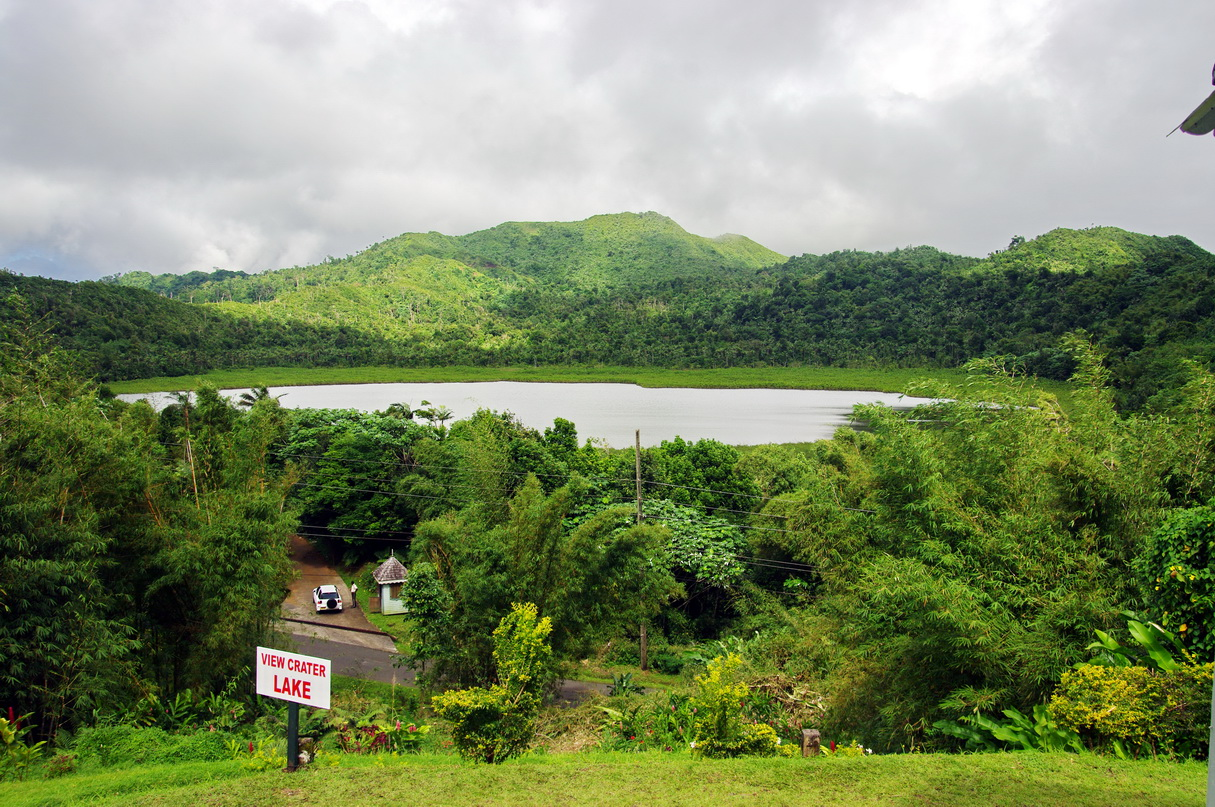

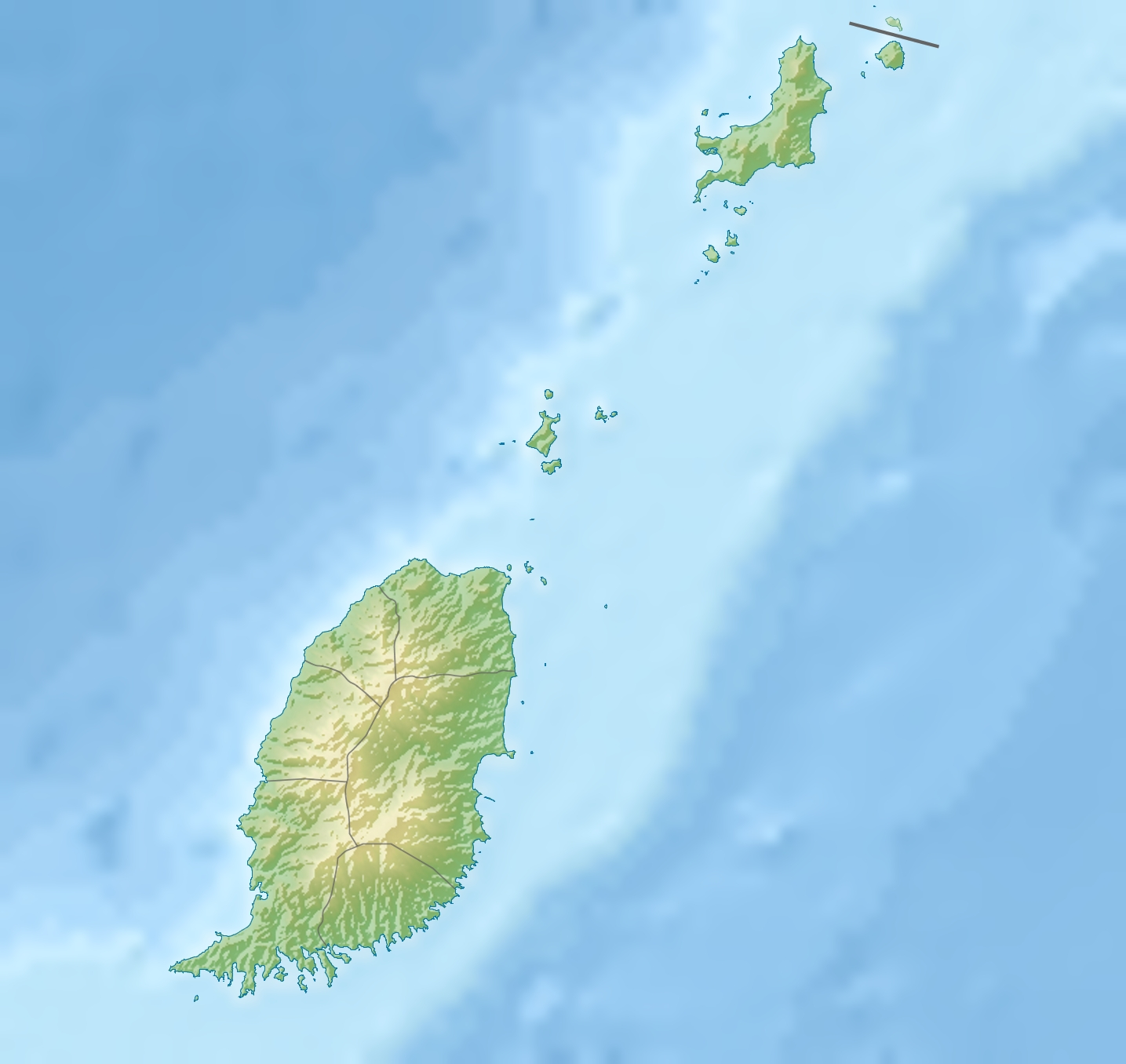
- Location within Grenada
- Location: Saint Andrew Parish, Grenada
- Coordinates: 12°5′49″N 61°41′46″W
- Type: Volcanic crater lake
- Surface area: 36 acres (15 ha)
- Max. depth: 20 ft (6.1 m)
- Surface elevation: 530 m (1,740 ft)

Grand Etang Lake is a crater lake in a volcano on the island of Grenada. The volcano, which is responsible for the formation of the island of Grenada, has been dormant for the last 12,000 years. The lake is represented on the coat of arms of Grenada.

== History ==
The area surrounding the lake was used as the headquarters of the Loyal Grenada Black Rangers in the early 1800s, it was a prime location for catching maroons (runaway slaves).

== Geography ==
Grand Etang Lake lies in Saint Andrew Parish. It is 530 m (1,740 ft) above sea level and it is one of the two crater lakes on the island (the other being Lake Antoine). The lake is approximately 20 ft (6.1 m) deep and 36 acres (15 ha) in area. A local fable says that the depths of the lake are home to a mermaid that lures men to a watery grave.

== Important Bird Area ==
The surrounding area being a forest reserve and national park, which encompasses the lake and surrounding mountains, has been designated an Important Bird Area (IBA) by BirdLife International because it supports significant populations of green-throated caribs, Antillean crested hummingbirds, Caribbean elaenias, Grenada flycatchers, lesser Antillean tanagers and lesser Antillean bullfinches.

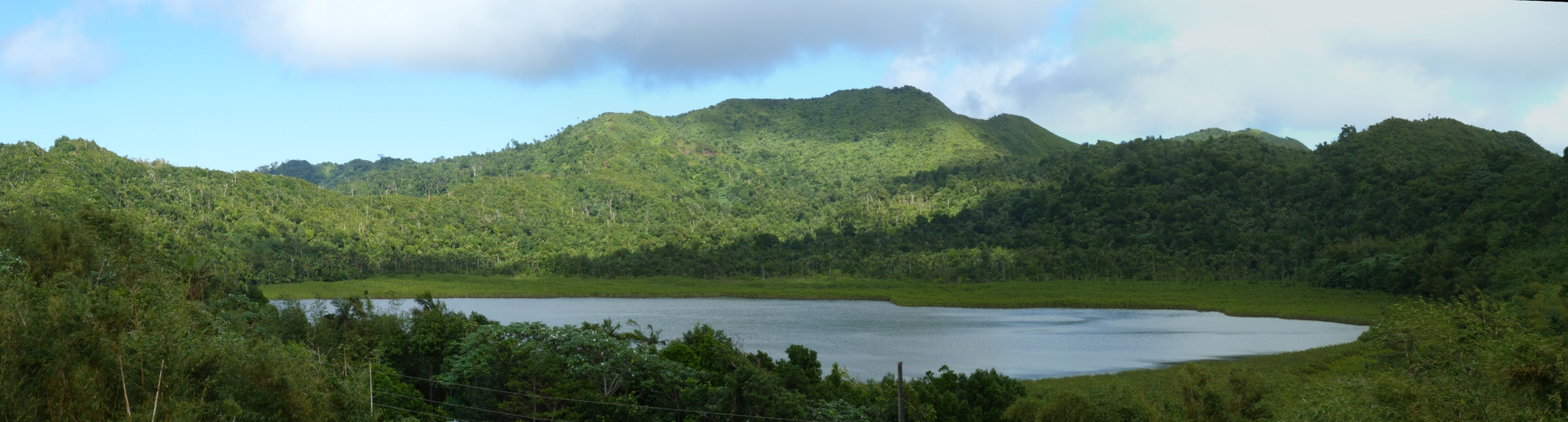
Grand Etang Lake
