= Louis La Grenade II =

Grenadian politician, officer and businessman

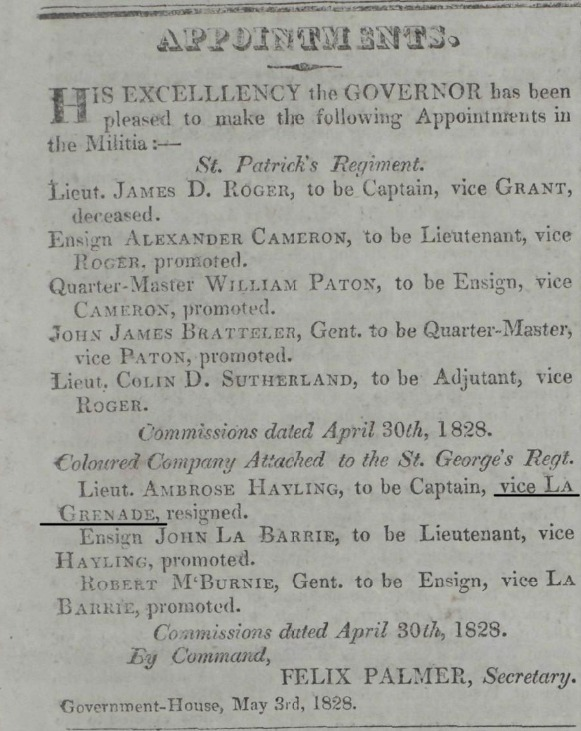
- Resignation of Louis La Grenade from the St George’s Coloured Militia (La Grenade’s name underlined in black), dating to the 3rd May 1828
- Born: c. 23 February 1776; Morne Jaloux, Grenada
- Died: 23 September 1850; Morne Jaloux, Grenada
- Occupations: Captain of the St George's Coloured Militia and council member in Grenada
- Title: Captain
- Term: c. 1798–1828
- Predecessor: Louis Cazot La Grenade
- Successor: Ambrose Hayling
- Children: William La Grenade and 2 others

Louis La Grenade II also known as Louis La Grenade Jr. or simply Louis La Grenade (c. 23 February 1776– 23 September 1850) was a Grenadian mulatto (mixed-race) politician, military leader and estate-owner during the colonial era of Grenada under the British.

== Biography ==
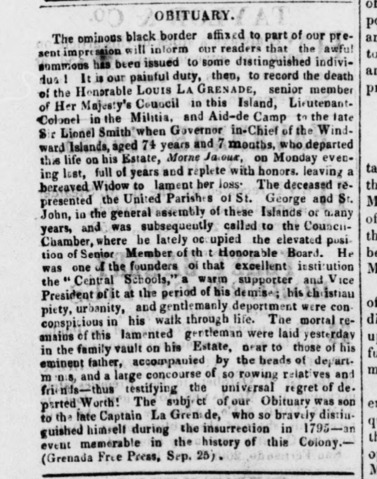
La Grenade’s Obituary

Louis La Grenade was born around the 23rd of February 1776 to Louis Cazot La Grenade and his partner Martha “Matty” La Grenade. La Grenade inherited Morne Jaloux estate from his father upon the death of his father in 1808. He also inherited the position of Captain in the St. George’s Coloured militia which he held until his formal resignation in May 1828. La Grenade bought Woburn Estate in Grenada around the year 1817 and owned it until 1823 when he gave it to his son William La Grenade (1801-1833). At the time of emancipation La Grenade owned 56 slaves (Although he owned more in the previous decades, upwards of 200). Across his estates in Grenada and Trinidad, he was given 2,065 pounds, 1 Shilling and 6 pence in total as compensation for the loss of his labour. His most profitable estate was Santa Trinidada in Savanna Grande, Trinidad. Louis La Grenade assisted in the capture of runaway slaves (maroons known as Nèg Mawon in Grenadian French Creole) just as his father had done previously. He died in 1850 at the age of 74, and was buried on the family estate near to his father’s mausoleum.

== Political Career ==
Between 1833 and 1836, La Grenade served as the aid-de camp to the governor in-chief of the Windward Islands, Sir Lionel Smith. He had an extensive political career, jointly representing St. George parish and St. John parish in the general assembly. Then in 1838, Louis La Grenade II was appointed to the Colonial Legislative Council and was the first person of colour to be elected to the council. He became a senior member of the council-chamber board and a founding member of the central schools institution. He was styled with the prefix “Hon.” denoting his political career.

== Relatives ==
Louis La Grenade was married twice, firstly to Marie Reine-Hill (1782–1830) and later Betsy Fraser (1780–1853). He had three children with his first wife Marie Reine-Hill. These were:

- Jane La Grenade (1800–1846)
- William La Grenade (1801–1833)
- Elizabeth La Grenade (1802–)

Jane La Grenade married John Mitchell who was the illegitimate son of the interim governor Samuel Mitchell. They both mainly lived in Trinidad and were the ancestors of Lewis Hamilton, Kirani James and Samuel Mitchell Jr. who served as the colonial secretary of Grenada in the mid-1800s.

William La Grenade acted as agent for both Woburn estate and Morne Jaloux estates for his father starting in 1823, he sold off Woburn estate a couple of years later and held onto Morne Jaloux. He was the ancestor of Alimenta La Grenade (1915–2013) who was the mother of Maurice Bishop. William La Grenade was also the ancestor of Cécile La Grenade, a prominent Grenadian politician.
