= Edward Mathew =

British Army officer

General Edward Mathew
- Born: 1729
- Died: 25 December 1805 (aged 75–76)
- Allegiance: Great Britain
- Branch: British Army
- Service years: 1746–1797
- Rank: General
- Conflicts: American War of Independence: Battle of Long Island (1776); Battle of Kip's Bay (1776); Battle of Ft Washington (1776); Battle of Brandywine (1777); Battle of Germantown (1777); Battle of White Marsh (1777); Battle of Monmouth (1778); Chesapeake raid (1779); Battle of Springfield (1780)

General Edward Mathew (1729 – 25 December 1805) was a British Army officer. By the time of the American War of Independence he had risen to the rank of colonel. Promoted to brigadier general, he was assigned to command the elite Brigade of Guards in the American campaign. In 1776 he led the Guards at Long Island, Kip's Bay, and Fort Washington where he spearheaded one of the assault forces. In the Philadelphia campaign, he commanded his brigade at Brandywine, Germantown, White Marsh, and Monmouth.

As a major general, he took part in the highly successful Chesapeake raid on Virginia ports in 1779. He led one of the columns in action at Battle of Springfield in 1780. He commanded in the West Indies in 1782 and became a full general in 1797. His beloved daughter Anna predeceased him in 1795. Mathew is likely to have been the model for a character in one of Jane Austen's novels.

== Early career ==
Born in 1729, Mathew became an ensign in the Regiment of Coldstream Guards (2nd Foot Guards) in 1746. In 1760 he married Lady Jane Bertie (d. 21 August 1793), daughter of Peregrine Bertie, 2nd Duke of Ancaster and Kesteven. By the year 1775 he was a colonel and aide de camp to King George III. He was appointed commander of the brigade of Guards in America with the rank of brigadier general. Mathew is described as "generous, full of honors, kind". However, he had a darker side that had a "bitter, stiff, and dictatorial presence". Though he dearly loved his daughter Anna, he could also erupt into a despotic rage. Because he was father-in-law to Jane Austen's brother James, he is supposed to have inspired the character General Tilney in her novel Northanger Abbey.

== American War of Independence ==
The British Army formed the 1,000-strong Brigade of Guards by selecting the men by lottery from the 1st, 2nd, and 3rd Foot Guards Regiments. The brigade was split into two battalions of about 500 troops each. Other regiments of foot assigned their light and grenadier companies to converged elite battalions, leaving only the eight line companies to fight with the parent unit. The Guards Brigade, however, retained its two flank companies. The grenadier company and the line companies of Hyde, Wrottesley, Cox, and Garth became the 1st Guards Battalion, while the light company and the line companies of Stephen, Murray, O'Hara, and Martin were assigned to the 2nd Guards Battalion. A detailed organization down to the company level can be found in the Brandywine order of battle. Lieutenant Colonel Sir George Osborn, 4th Baronet commanded the grenadier company while Captain Thomas Twistleton led the light company.

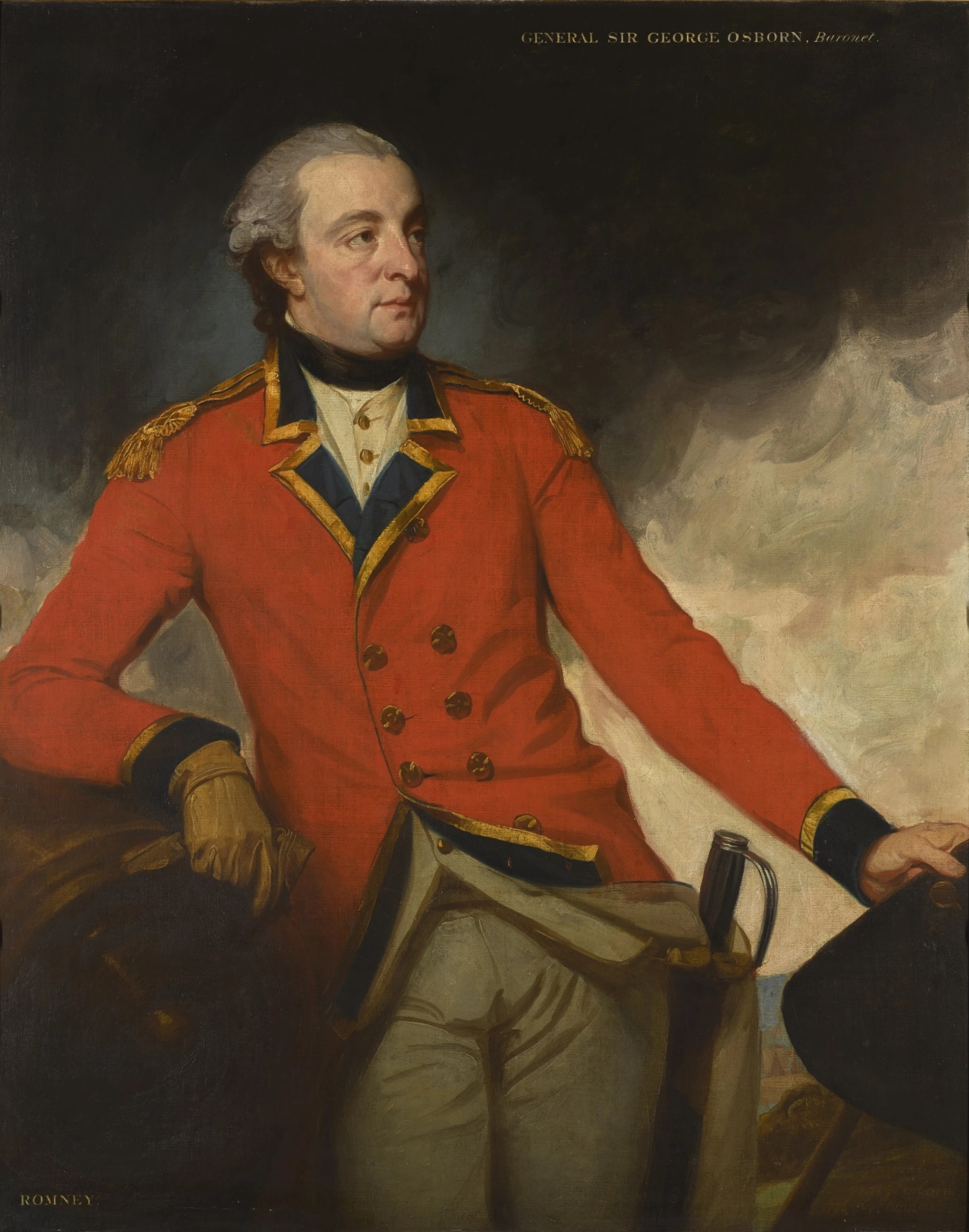
Sir George Osborn was one of a number of aristocratic officers in Mathew's Guards Brigade

The Guards Brigade landed on Long Island on 22 August 1776 and was present in the Battle of Long Island five days later. On 15 September the Guards Brigade took part in the Battle of Kip's Bay, landing in the first wave. Mathew played a significant role at the Battle of Fort Washington on 16 November. With two light infantry battalions under his leadership, he boated across the Harlem River near what is now 200th Street and established a bridgehead. This effort was followed up by Lord Charles Cornwallis with the Guards Brigade, two grenadier battalions, and the 33rd Foot. The advance of this and other columns resulted in a resounding British victory including the capture of 2,818 Americans. After the American victory at Trenton, the 1st Guards Battalion was assigned to Cornwallis for the Princeton campaign in early January 1777. However, Mathew stayed behind with the 2nd Battalion in New Brunswick, New Jersey. The Guards were involved in several skirmishes during the Forage War.

The grenadier and light companies of the Guards were in action at the Battle of Short Hills on 26 June 1777 where one of their officers was mortally wounded. On the 29th, the British Army abruptly abandoned New Jersey. Sir William Howe sailed with his army from New York on 23 July. At the end of August, the British troops landed at Head of Elk, Maryland at the north end of Chesapeake Bay. Among the Guards officers present during the subsequent Philadelphia campaign were Captain-lieutenant Richard FitzPatrick of the 1st Foot Guards, Colonel Charles O'Hara of the 2nd Foot Guards, and Lieutenant Colonel Sir John Wrottesley.

On 11 September 1777 at the Battle of Brandywine, Mathew's brigade joined the flanking column under Howe and Cornwallis. This body of troops reached a position behind the American right flank before it was discovered. The Guards Brigade deployed on the right of the first line around 4:00 PM. Osborn commanded both the grenadier company on the right and the light company which deployed as skirmishers in front. The Guards faced two Maryland brigades under the command of Major General John Sullivan. Because Sullivan was also the American right-wing commander, he left the Marylanders in charge of the senior officer, Brigadier General Philippe Hubert Preudhomme de Borre. Attempting to shift the troops to the right, de Borre bungled his assignment, throwing his lines into disarray. The attack of the Guards brushed aside their confused opponents. The brigade reported only one killed, five wounded, and two missing, including one casualty from the grenadiers and three from the light company.

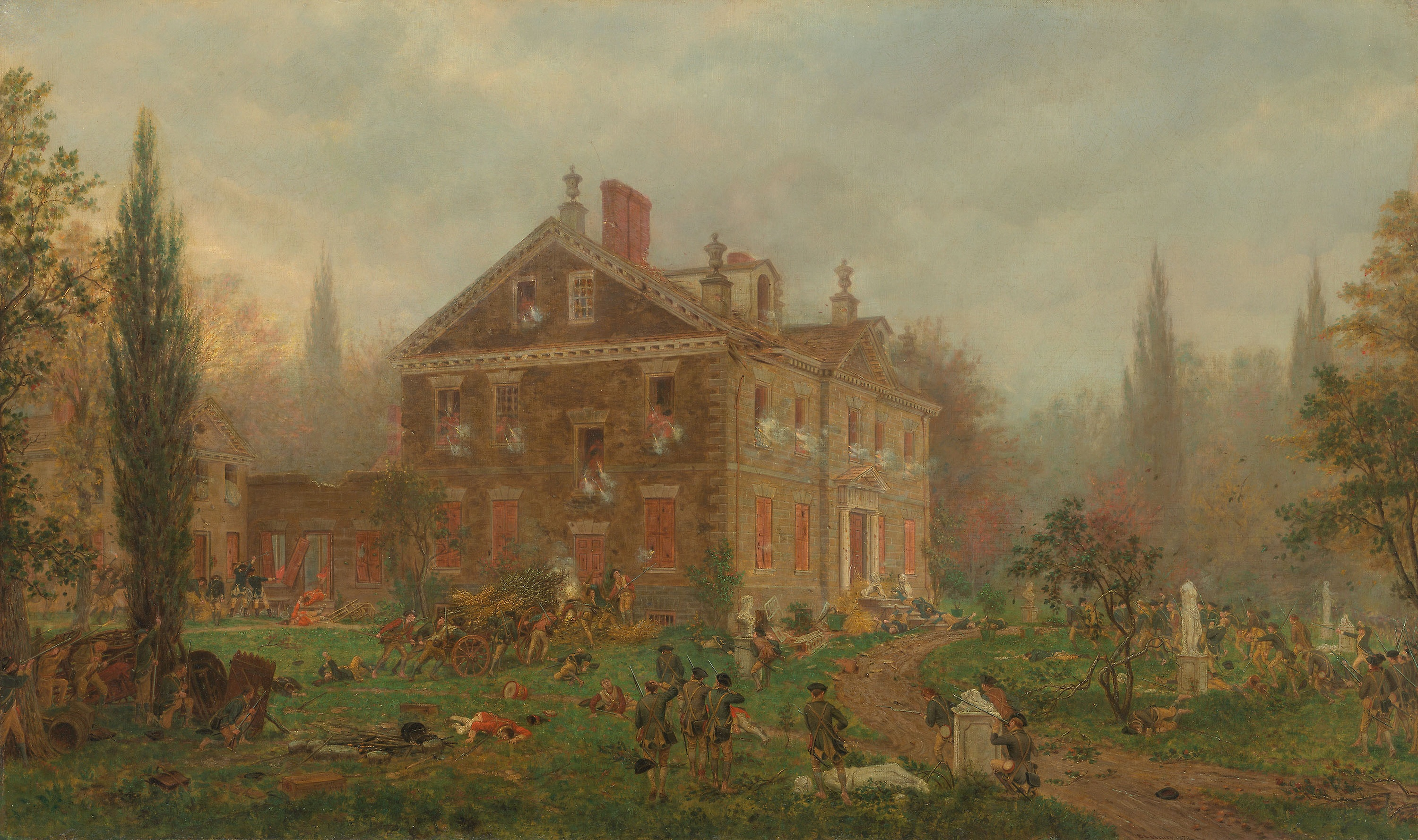
Battle of Germantown, 11 September 1777

The evening before the Battle of Germantown on 4 October 1777, Howe alerted Osborn of a possible attack and ordered the Guard Brigade's grenadier and light companies to support the Queen's Rangers on the right flank. In the morning they were attacked by a force of Maryland and New Jersey militia. The militia effort quickly collapsed, allowing the British to wheel to their left to outflank a brigade of Connecticut continentals. At some point in the action, Mathew led forward the line companies of the Guards Brigade to reinforce Osborn's flank companies. During the Battle of White Marsh in December 1777, the Guards light company under Captain Twistleton fought with the army's vanguard at Edge Hill. In early 1778 Mathew was promoted to the "local rank" of major general.

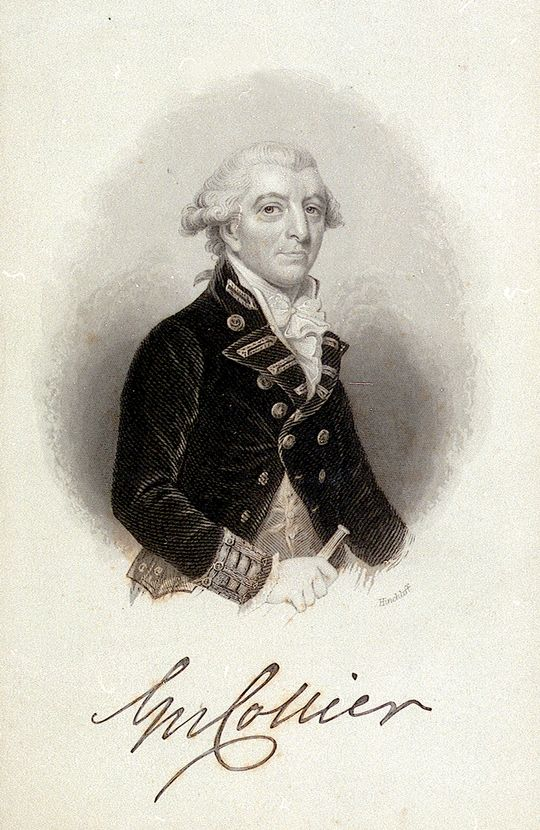
Sir George Collier

Mathew led his brigade at the Battle of Monmouth on 28 June 1778. At Monmouth, Colonel Harry Trelawny led the 502-man 1st Guards Battalion while Lieutenant Colonel James Ogilvie commanded the 480-strong 2nd Guards Battalion. Trelawny was wounded and about 40 casualties were inflicted when some of Anthony Wayne's troops under Lieutenant Colonels Walter Stewart and Nathaniel Ramsey fired on the Guards while concealed in a wood. Joined by the 1st Grenadier Battalion, the Guards quickly flushed the Americans out of the trees.

General Henry Clinton fitted out a joint navy and army expedition in the spring of 1779. Under Commodore Sir George Collier and Mathew, the force sailed from New York City on 5 May and reached Hampton Roads four days later. When the expedition approached Fort Nelson near Norfolk, Virginia, its 100-man American garrison under Major Thomas Matthews immediately decamped and retreated toward the Great Dismal Swamp. On 11 May, the British force occupied Norfolk, Suffolk, Portsmouth, and the Gosport Shipyard. The Americans burned a 28-gun frigate and two French merchantmen to prevent their capture. Besides seizing enormous amounts of tobacco, naval cannons, and marine supplies, the British burned or captured 137 ships. The damage inflicted on the state of Virginia in the Chesapeake raid was estimated at £2,000,000. Mathew and Collier returned to New York in triumph, having suffered no loss of life.

The Guards Brigade joined Lieutenant General Wilhelm von Knyphausen's 5,000 raid on New Jersey on 7 June 1780. Mathew was one of six brigade commanders employed on the expedition. After the initial attack stalled, the British-Hessian force lunged forward again on 23 June to bring on the Battle of Springfield. While Knyphausen hammered at Springfield Bridge, he sent Mathew with half his force in a flanking move via Vauxhall Bridge. Colonel Israel Angell's 2nd Rhode Island Regiment held back Knyphausen's column for 40 minutes as Brigadier General William Maxwell and Major Light Horse Harry Lee delayed Mathew's envelopment. At length, Major General Nathanael Greene had to commit additional troops to block Mathew's turning movement. In the face of strong resistance, Knyphausen called off the operation in the afternoon and returned to Staten Island. Mathew left North America for England later in 1780.

== Later career ==
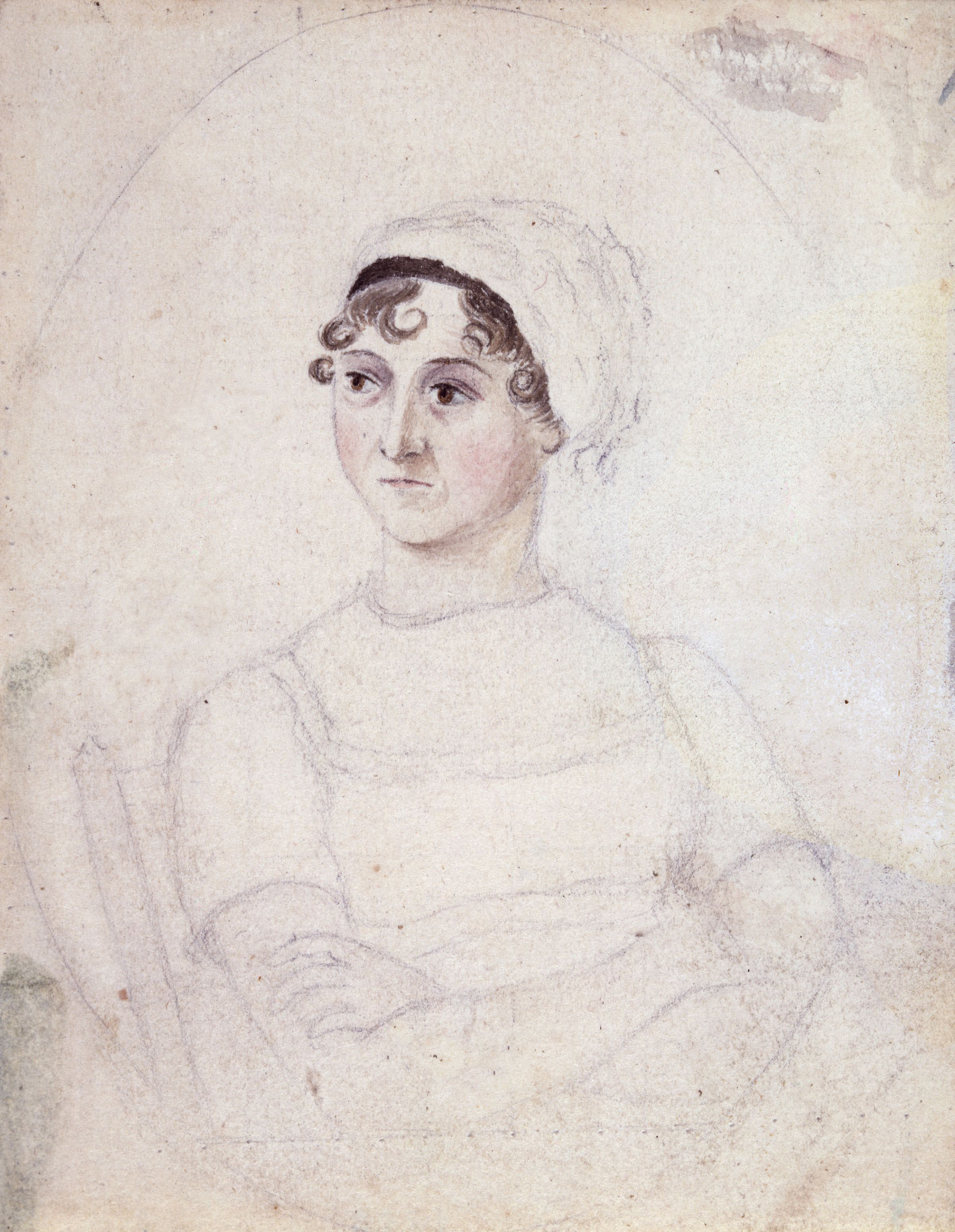
Jane Austen, who may have used Mathew as a model for one of her characters.

In November 1782, Mathew was appointed commander-in-chief of British forces in the Windward Islands. In 1779, a French fleet under Admiral Charles Henri Hector, Count of Estaing had captured Grenada from the British as part of the American War of Independence. At the end of the conflict in 1783, the colony was returned to Britain and Mathew appointed as its governor. He discovered that the fortifications on Richmond Hill were in a "ruinous condition"; the old French fortifications on Grenada were subsequently replaced by new forts known as Forts Frederick, Adolphus, Lucas and Mathew. Much of labour used for the fort's construction was supplied by the 300-strong Carolina Corps, a military unit formed from Black South Carolina slaves freed by the British in exchange for military service. A 1787 report noted that progress on the forts' construction was satisfactory. Mathew was promoted to general in 1797.

During his second tenure as governor of Grenada, George III neglected to have HM Treasury approve Mathew's salary. Despite his innocence, Mathew was billed for the £11,000 that he was paid as legitimate wages in 1792. By this time, George was experiencing bouts of madness and could not confirm details such as whether he authorised Mathew's salary. After his death the family had to pay back £23,000 to the Exchequer. On 27 March 1792, James Austen married Mathew's 30-year-old daughter Anne, who was considered a spinster. The couple had a daughter named Jane in 1793. Though Mathew financially supported the couple, who lived on James' £300 yearly salary as a clergyman, the two ran through their funds quickly. Mathew purchased a commission as chaplain for James in the 86th Regiment of Foot so that his son-in-law could live on the salary. However, Anna died very suddenly on 3 May 1795. Mathew died on 25 December 1805. In his will, he left the slaves he owned in Dominica to his son Brownlow.

== Notes ==
Footnotes

Citations

Military offices
Preceded by Valentine Jones	Colonel of the 62nd Regiment of Foot; 1879–1805	Succeeded by Sir George Nugent, 1st Baronet
