= Morne Jaloux =

- Village
- Location within Grenada
- Coordinates: 12°02′14″N 61°44′02″W
- Country: Grenada
- Parish: Saint George
- Elevation: 210 ft (64 m)
- Time zone: UTC-4

Morne Jaloux is a town in Saint George Parish, Grenada. It is located at the southern end of the island. The area was owned by a man called Louis Cazot La Grenade and later his son Louis La Grenade II.
