= Grenada Volunteer Force =

Grenadian military unit

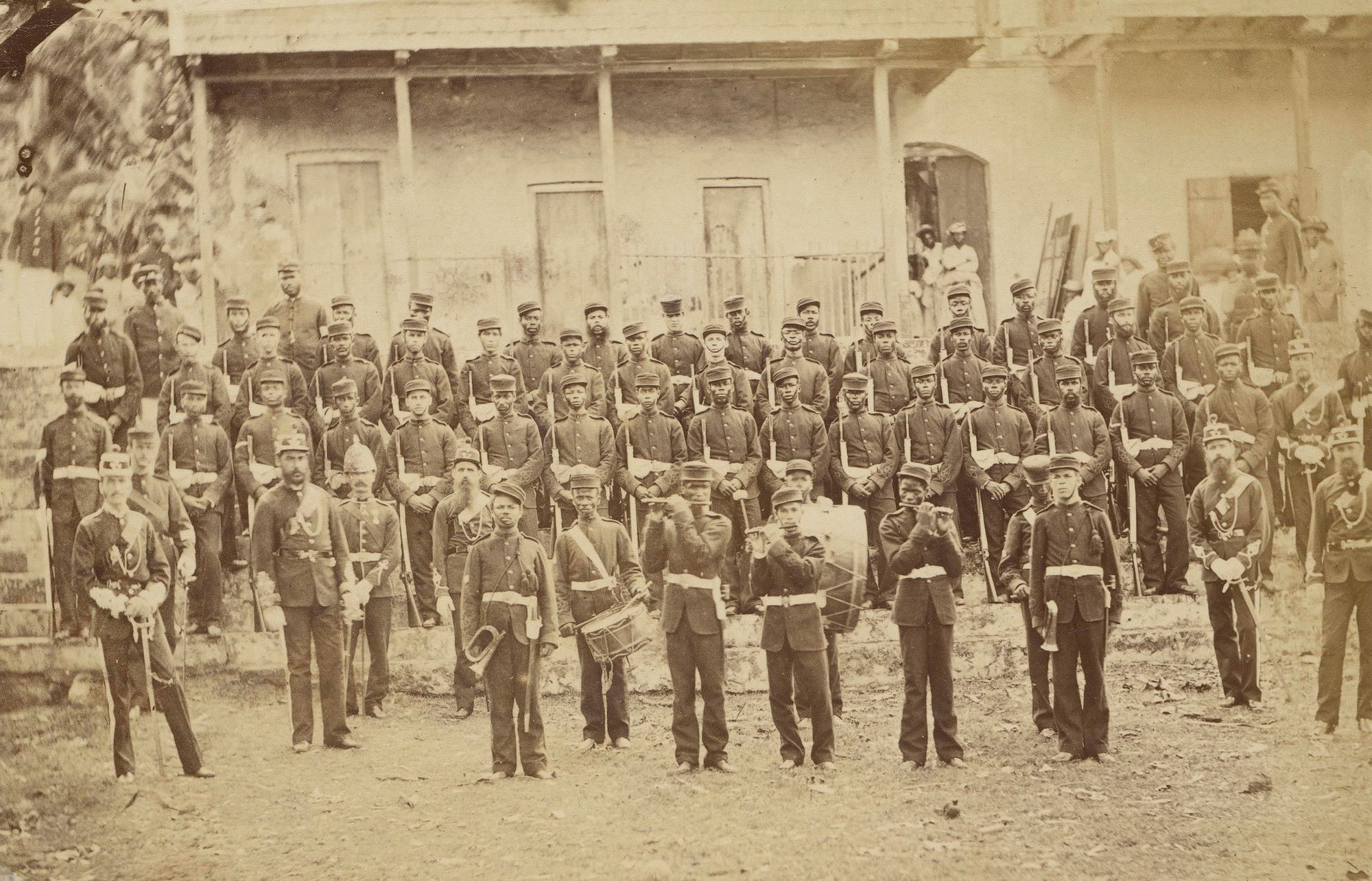
- Photo of the Grenada Volunteer Force, with bandsmen in front (1880)
- Active: 1878–1881, 1911–1939, 1945–1967, 1974–1979
- Disbanded: 1979 (Due to the Grenadian Revolution and the founding of the People's Revolutionary Army (Grenada)
- Country: British Empire (Colony of Grenada) and later Grenada
- Branch: Army
- Type: Infantry
- Role: Grenada Defence force
- Size: 50 (1911); 105 (Aft. 1911); 87 (1935)
- Garrison/HQ: Fort St George’s, Queen’s Park and Telescope Point

The Grenada Volunteer Force (later the Grenada Volunteer Corps), was the main defensive force on the island of Grenada from 1878 to 1939 (until it was merged with the Royal Grenada Police force to create the Grenada Defence Force). It was then recreated two other times.

== History ==
The force was founded in 1878 as the primary defence force for the island (as the previous parish militias had been defunct since the mid-1800s). the force was proposed in March 1878 and came into existence later in September or the same year. This first force was disbanded in June 1881. In 1886, 100 snider rifles meant for the Grenada Volunteer Force were given to the Royal Grenada Police Force due to the disbandment of the Volunteer force.

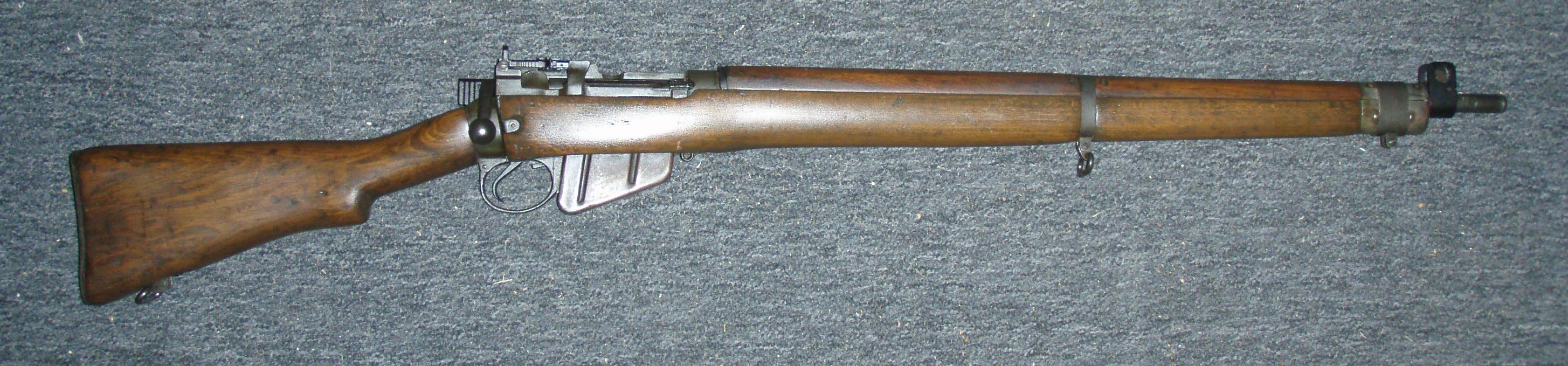
Lee Enfield Rifle (MLE), the Volunteer force was equipped with Lee Enfield rifles and later one Lewis machine gun

In 1910, the government of Grenada held multiple meetings regarding the formation of a new Volunteer force. £250 was allocated to the founding of this force, to arm and equip them. It was founded with 50 men originally and was to be increased to 100 at a preferable time. The first 50 men were sworn in for a term of 3 years on the 2nd March 1911. The force quickly rose to have 5 officers and 100 NCOs and Privates, armed with M.L.E rifles. Members of the force were required to attend 12 drills a year (new recruits were required to attend 30), and both members and recruits had to attend inspections and musketry practice drills. The force included 25 mounted members from the St Andrew's rifle ranges. During WW1, some of the members of the force volunteered to fight during WW1 (as part of the British West Indies Regiment).

In 1935, the force consisted of 1 infantry company which was made up of 5 officers and 82 other ranks. The corps was equipped with Lee-Enfields (MLEs and SMLEs) and one Lewis gun. In 1937, the troops of the volunteer force were given the coronation medal, to mark the coronation of King George VI.

In 1939, expecting the outbreak of war, the regional government amalgamated the Volunteer force and reserves were combined with the Royal Grenada Police Force to create the Grenada Defence Force, whose primary objective was to defend the island and the vital supplies within. The Grenada Volunteer reserve was also created and the troops received military training and uniforms.

The force was recreated after the war in smaller numbers, before eventually being disbanded after the Grenadian Revolution.

== List of Commanders ==
- 25th February 1911, Captain David L. Slinger
- 1915—29th November 1916, Captain David Hedog-Jones
- 1945–1947, Lieutenant J. W Fletcher
