= Fort Matthew (Grenada) =

Fort in Grenada

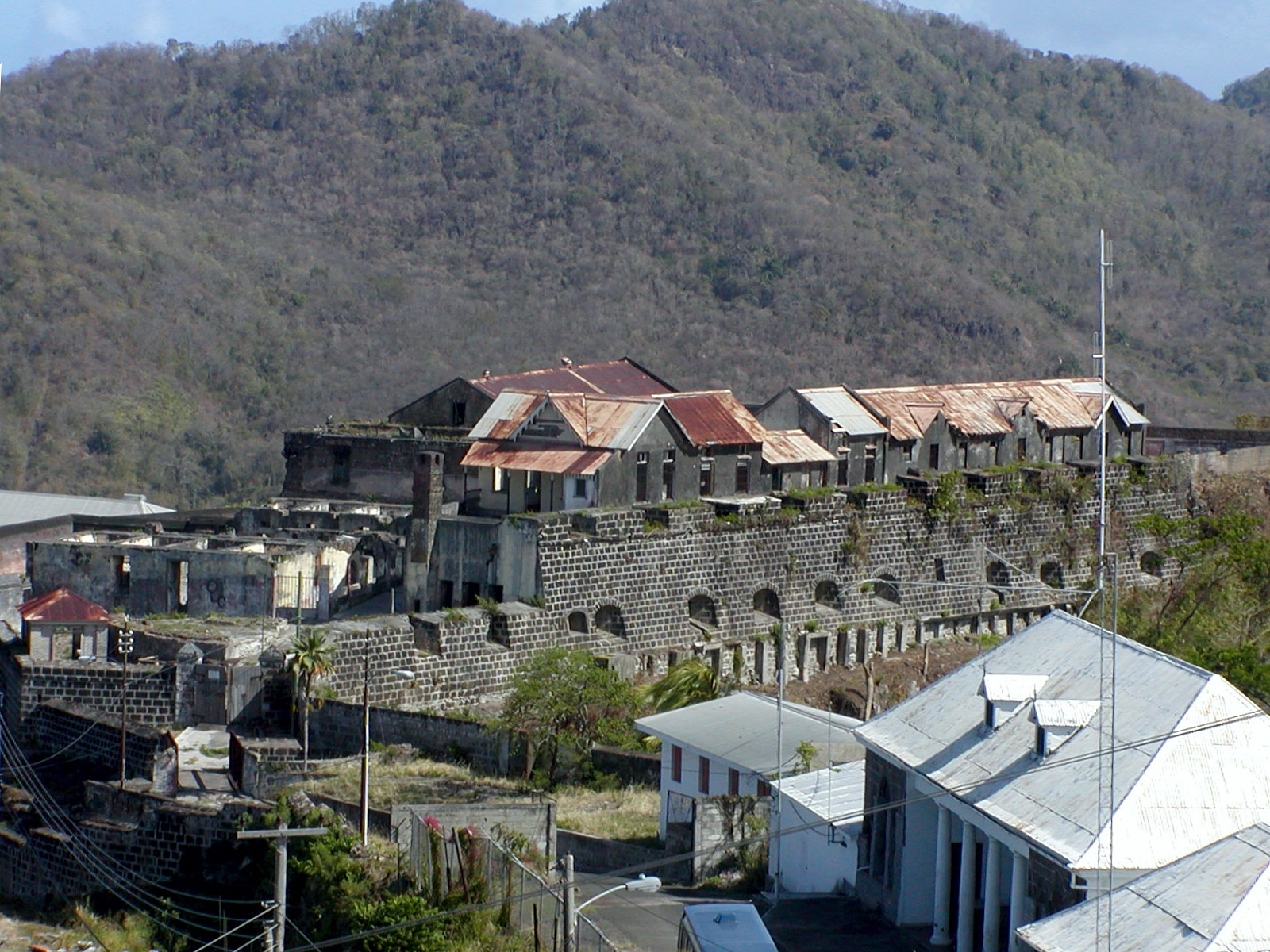
Fort Matthew

Fort Matthew is a fortification in Saint George Parish in Grenada. It was constructed between 1784 and 1790. The fort sits atop Richmond hill just like the neighbouring fort of Fort Frederick. It is nearby to the village of Morne Jaloux and Richmond hill prison.

== History ==
The fort was started by the French along with smaller but older neighbouring Fort Frederick which is a mere 150 metres away. Fort Matthew was named after the English governor Edward Matthew. During Fédon’s rebellion the fort was taken by the insurgents and was retaken by the British on 19th June 1796 by the forces of Sir Ralph Abercromby.

In the year 1880, the fort was turned into a mental asylum for the Windward islands and remained one until 1987 when it was abandoned due to the opening of a new asylum at Mt. Gay. The site housed an Anti-Aircraft (AA) artillery battery in the courtyard during the Grenadian revolution and was accidentally bombed by the US Air Force which resulted in the deaths of many of the patients at the asylum.

Currently, the fort is in a state of disrepair and isn't as preserved as neighbouring Fort Frederick which is largely intact.

== Architecture ==
The fort is 1500 yards long and still retains the kitchens, the original 18th century bathrooms, a block of prison cells and underground store-tunnels. However other parts of the fort are ruined due to the bombing and due to a lack of upkeep.
