= Fort Frederick (Grenada) =

Fort in Grenada

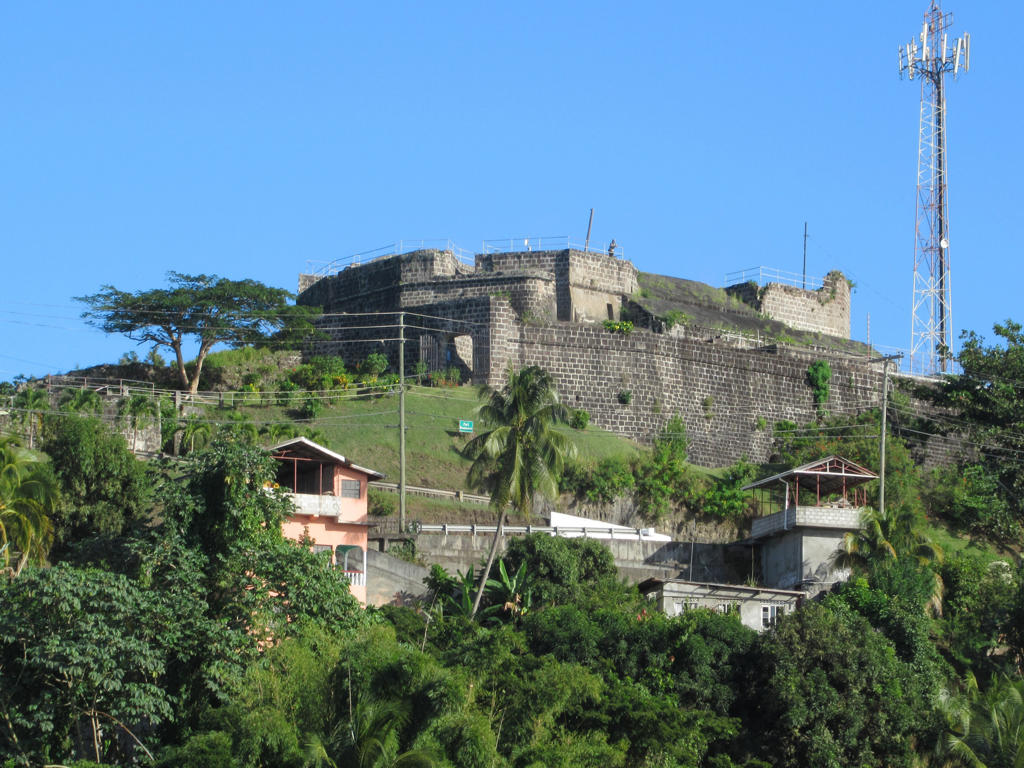
Fort Frederick

Fort Frederick is a fortification in Saint George's Parish in Grenada, constructed in 1779.

== History ==
The fort was constructed by the French in 1779 after their recapture of the island of Grenada. It was constructed on Richmond Hill along with another fort called Fort Matthew which is only 150 metres away. Fort Frederick being the one which was better maintained. The fort was built facing the interior of the island with the French cannons posted towards the inner hills of the island, whilst other forts faced outwards to sea. The fort was finished in 1783 by the British who retook the island after the brief French interlude.

It is said that King Henri Christophe of Haiti stowed away in Fort Frederick after escaping from the San Souci estate in Grenada. Then he managed to stow away on a ship towards Haiti.

In the Grenadian revolution of 1979 the fort was the headquarters of the motorised division of the PRA (People's Revolutionary army). Meetings were held at the site in the later half of the revolution just before the US Invasion, and it was from Fort Frederick on the 19th October 1983 that PRA Lieutenant Colonel Ewart Layne gave the orders for the recapture of Fort George and the capture of Maurice Bishop and his cabinet ministers (who were subsequently killed by orders of Bernard Coard).

== The Fort ==
The fort consists of four levels, the upper level being the roof (where you can see 360 degree panoramic views of St George's), the third level below the roof is where ammunition was stored, the second level containing water cisterns and cannons, and the fourth level being tunnels for the storage of provisions.
