= Pre-2012 statewide opinion polling for the 2012 United States presidential election =

Statewide polls for the 2012 United States presidential election are as follows. The polls listed here, by state, are from 2009 to December 31, 2011, and provide early data on opinion polling between a possible Republican candidate against incumbent President Barack Obama.

Note that some states did not conduct polling before December 31, 2011.

== Arizona ==
11 electoral votes
(Republican in 2004) 55%–44%
(Republican in 2008) 53%–45%

Poll source	Date administered	Democrat	%	Republican	%	Lead margin	Sample Size	Margin of error
Public Policy Polling	November 17–20, 2011	Barack Obama	46%	Herman Cain	42%	4	500 RV	±4.4%
Public Policy Polling	November 17–20, 2011	Barack Obama	45%	Newt Gingrich	45%	Tied	500 RV	±4.4%
Public Policy Polling	November 17–20, 2011	Barack Obama	43%	Ron Paul	44%	1	500 RV	±4.4%
Public Policy Polling	November 17–20, 2011	Barack Obama	47%	Rick Perry	40%	7	500 RV	±4.4%
Public Policy Polling	November 17–20, 2011	Barack Obama	42%	Mitt Romney	49%	7	500 RV	±4.4%
BRC/Rocky Mountain Poll	October 13–24, 2011	Barack Obama	45%	Herman Cain	38%	7	581 RV	±4.1%
BRC/Rocky Mountain Poll	October 13–24, 2011	Barack Obama	45%	Mitt Romney	40%	5	581 RV	±4.1%
BRC/Rocky Mountain Poll	October 13–24, 2011	Barack Obama	44%	Rick Perry	38%	6	581 RV	±4.1%
Public Policy Polling	April 28 – May 1, 2011	Barack Obama	47%	Newt Gingrich	40%	7	623 RV	±3.9%
Public Policy Polling	April 28 – May 1, 2011	Barack Obama	46%	Mike Huckabee	44%	2	623 RV	±3.9%
Public Policy Polling	April 28 – May 1, 2011	Barack Obama	49%	Sarah Palin	38%	11	623 RV	±3.9%
Public Policy Polling	April 28 – May 1, 2011	Barack Obama	44%	Mitt Romney	48%	4	623 RV	±3.9%
Public Policy Polling	April 28 – May 1, 2011	Barack Obama	48%	Donald Trump	36%	12	623 RV	±3.9%
Public Policy Polling	January 28–30, 2011	Barack Obama	46%	Newt Gingrich	46%	Tied	599 RV	±4.0%
Public Policy Polling	January 28–30, 2011	Barack Obama	44%	Mike Huckabee	48%	4	599 RV	±4.0%
Public Policy Polling	January 28–30, 2011	Barack Obama	49%	Sarah Palin	41%	8	599 RV	±4.0%
Public Policy Polling	January 28–30, 2011	Barack Obama	43%	Mitt Romney	49%	6	599 RV	±4.0%
Public Policy Polling	September 18–21, 2009	Barack Obama	47%	Sarah Palin	47%	Tied	617 RV	±3.9%
Public Policy Polling	September 18–21, 2009	Barack Obama	45%	Mike Huckabee	49%	4	617 RV	±3.9%
Public Policy Polling	September 18–21, 2009	Barack Obama	43%	Mitt Romney	50%	7	617 RV	±3.9%

== Arkansas ==
6 electoral votes
(Republican in 2004) 54%–45%
(Republican in 2008) 59%–39%

Poll source	Date administered	Democrat	%	Republican	%	Lead margin	Sample Size	Margin of error
Talk Business/Hendrix College	September 15, 2011	Barack Obama	33.5%	Mitt Romney	49.5%	16	2,101 RV	±2.1%

== California ==
55 electoral votes
(Democratic in 2004) 54%–45%
(Democratic in 2008) 61%–37%

Poll source	Date administered	Democrat	%	Republican	%	Lead margin	Sample Size	Margin of error
Field Research Corporation (Field Poll)	November 15–27, 2011	Barack Obama	50%	Mitt Romney	40%	10	1,000 RV	±3.1%
Field Research Corporation (Field Poll)	November 15–27, 2011	Barack Obama	55%	Newt Gingrich	35%	20	1,000 RV	±3.1%
Public Policy Polling	November 10–13, 2011	Barack Obama	60%	Michele Bachmann	31%	29	500 RV	±4.4%
Public Policy Polling	November 10–13, 2011	Barack Obama	61%	Herman Cain	32%	29	500 RV	±4.4%
Public Policy Polling	November 10–13, 2011	Barack Obama	60%	Newt Gingrich	34%	26	500 RV	±4.4%
Public Policy Polling	November 10–13, 2011	Barack Obama	57%	Ron Paul	32%	25	500 RV	±4.4%
Public Policy Polling	November 10–13, 2011	Barack Obama	60%	Rick Perry	31%	29	500 RV	±4.4%
Public Policy Polling	November 10–13, 2011	Barack Obama	57%	Mitt Romney	36%	21	500 RV	±4.4%
Survey USA	November 10, 2011	Barack Obama	56%	Newt Gingrich	32%	24	800 A	±3.5%
Survey USA	November 10, 2011	Barack Obama	50%	Mitt Romney	39%	11	800 A	±3.5%
Field Research Corporation (Field Poll)	September 1–12, 2011	Barack Obama	51%	Mitt Romney	38%	13	1,001 RV	±3.2%
Field Research Corporation (Field Poll)	September 1–12, 2011	Barack Obama	54%	Rick Perry	35%	19	1,001 RV	±3.2%
L.A. Times/USC Dornsife/Greenberg Quinlan Rosner	August 17–28, 2011	Barack Obama	56%	Rick Perry	32%	24	1,408 RV	±4%
L.A. Times/USC Dornsife/Greenberg Quinlan Rosner	August 17–28, 2011	Barack Obama	57%	Michele Bachmann	31%	26	1,408 RV	±4%
L.A. Times/USC Dornsife/Greenberg Quinlan Rosner	August 17–28, 2011	Barack Obama	54%	Mitt Romney	35%	19	1,408 RV	±4%
Public Policy Polling	January 28–30, 2011	Barack Obama	58%	Newt Gingrich	34%	24	892 RV	±3.3%
Public Policy Polling	January 28–30, 2011	Barack Obama	54%	Mike Huckabee	39%	15	892 RV	±3.3%
Public Policy Polling	January 28–30, 2011	Barack Obama	62%	Sarah Palin	31%	31	892 RV	±3.3%
Public Policy Polling	January 28–30, 2011	Barack Obama	56%	Mitt Romney	36%	20	892 RV	±3.3%

== Colorado ==
9 electoral votes
(Republican in 2004) 52%–47%
(Democratic in 2008) 54%–45%

Poll source	Date administered	Democrat	%	Republican	%	Lead margin	Sample Size	Margin of error
Public Policy Polling	December 1–4, 2011	Barack Obama	50%	Newt Gingrich	42%	8	793	±3.5%
Public Policy Polling	December 1–4, 2011	Barack Obama	52%	Herman Cain	36%	16	793	±3.5%
Public Policy Polling	December 1–4, 2011	Barack Obama	48%	Ron Paul	39%	9	793	±3.5%
Public Policy Polling	December 1–4, 2011	Barack Obama	52%	Rick Perry	37%	15	793	±3.5%
Public Policy Polling	December 1–4, 2011	Barack Obama	47%	Mitt Romney	45%	2	793	±3.5%
Public Policy Polling	August 4–7, 2011	Barack Obama	51%	Michele Bachmann	39%	12	510	±4.3%
Public Policy Polling	August 4–7, 2011	Barack Obama	51%	Herman Cain	35%	16	510	±4.3%
Public Policy Polling	August 4–7, 2011	Barack Obama	54%	Sarah Palin	38%	16	510	±4.3%
Public Policy Polling	August 4–7, 2011	Barack Obama	51%	Rick Perry	38%	13	510	±4.3%
Public Policy Polling	August 4–7, 2011	Barack Obama	48%	Mitt Romney	41%	7	510	±4.3%
Public Policy Polling	February 4–6, 2011	Barack Obama	53%	Newt Gingrich	39%	14	517	±4.3%
Public Policy Polling	February 4–6, 2011	Barack Obama	51%	Mike Huckabee	42%	9	517	±4.3%
Public Policy Polling	February 4–6, 2011	Barack Obama	55%	Sarah Palin	36%	19	517	±4.3%
Public Policy Polling	February 4–6, 2011	Barack Obama	47%	Mitt Romney	41%	6	517	±4.3%

== Connecticut ==
7 electoral votes
(Democratic in 2004) 54%–44%
(Democratic in 2008) 61%–38%

Poll source	Date administered	Democrat	%	Republican	%	Lead margin	Sample Size	Margin of error
Public Policy Polling	September 22–25, 2011	Barack Obama	55%	Michele Bachmann	36%	19	592 RV	±4.0%
Public Policy Polling	September 22–25, 2011	Barack Obama	54%	Newt Gingrich	38%	16	592 RV	±4.0%
Public Policy Polling	September 22–25, 2011	Barack Obama	53%	Rick Perry	41%	12	592 RV	±4.0%
Public Policy Polling	September 22–25, 2011	Barack Obama	47%	Mitt Romney	45%	2	592 RV	±4.0%
Quinnipiac University	September 8–13, 2011	Barack Obama	52%	Rick Perry	33%	19	1,230 RV	±2.8%
Quinnipiac University	September 8–13, 2011	Barack Obama	49%	Mitt Romney	36%	13	1,230 RV	±2.8%

== Florida ==
29 electoral votes
(Republican in 2004) 52%–47%
(Democratic in 2008) 51%–48%

Poll source	Date administered	Democrat	%	Republican	%	Lead margin	Sample size	Margin of error
NBC News/Marist College	December 4–7, 2011	Barack Obama	48%	Mitt Romney	41%	7	2,119	±2.1%
NBC News/Marist College	December 4–7, 2011	Barack Obama	51%	Newt Gingrich	39%	12	2,119	±2.1%
NBC News/Marist College	December 4–7, 2011	Barack Obama	49%	Ron Paul	36%	13	2,119	±2.1%
Quinnipiac University	November 28 – December 5, 2011	Barack Obama	42%	Mitt Romney	45%	3	1,226	±2.8%
Quinnipiac University	November 28 – December 5, 2011	Barack Obama	46%	Newt Gingrich	44%	2	1,226	±2.8%
Public Policy Polling	November 28 – December 1, 2011	Barack Obama	45%	Mitt Romney	44%	1	700	±3.7%
Public Policy Polling	November 28 – December 1, 2011	Barack Obama	50%	Newt Gingrich	44%	6	700	±3.7%
Public Policy Polling	November 28 – December 1, 2011	Barack Obama	51%	Herman Cain	37%	14	700	±3.7%
Public Policy Polling	November 28 – December 1, 2011	Barack Obama	46%	Rick Perry	40%	6	700	±3.7%
Public Policy Polling	November 28 – December 1, 2011	Barack Obama	50%	Ron Paul	38%	12	700	±3.7%
Rasmussen Reports/Pulse Opinion Research	November 17, 2011	Barack Obama	42%	Mitt Romney	46%	4	500 LV	±4.5%
Rasmussen Reports/Pulse Opinion Research	November 17, 2011	Barack Obama	46%	Herman Cain	37%	9	500 LV	±4.5%
Rasmussen Reports/Pulse Opinion Research	November 17, 2011	Barack Obama	45%	Newt Gingrich	43%	2	500 LV	±4.5%
Quinnipiac University	October 31 – November 7, 2011	Barack Obama	45%	Herman Cain	41%	4	1,185 RV	±2.9%
Quinnipiac University	October 31 – November 7, 2011	Barack Obama	45%	Newt Gingrich	42%	3	1,185 RV	±2.9%
Quinnipiac University	October 31 – November 7, 2011	Barack Obama	46%	Rick Perry	40%	6	1,185 RV	±2.9%
Quinnipiac University	October 31 – November 7, 2011	Barack Obama	42%	Mitt Romney	45%	3	1,185 RV	±2.9%
Suffolk University	October 26–30, 2011	Barack Obama	42%	Herman Cain	39%	3	800 RV	Not reported
Suffolk University	October 26–30, 2011	Barack Obama	46%	Rick Perry	34%	8	800 RV	Not reported
Suffolk University	October 26–30, 2011	Barack Obama	44%	Ron Paul	32%	12	800 RV	Not reported
Suffolk University	October 26–30, 2011	Barack Obama	45%	Newt Gingrich	38%	7	800 RV	Not reported
Suffolk University	October 26–30, 2011	Barack Obama	42%	Mitt Romney	42%	Tied	800 RV	Not reported
NBC News/Marist College	October 10–12, 2011	Barack Obama	47%	Herman Cain	41%	6	2,225	±2.1%
NBC News/Marist College	October 10–12, 2011	Barack Obama	47%	Rick Perry	39%	8	2,225	±2.1%
NBC News/Marist College	October 10–12, 2011	Barack Obama	45%	Mitt Romney	43%	2	2,225	±2.1%
Public Policy Polling	September 22–25, 2011	Barack Obama	49%	Michele Bachmann	44%	5	476	±4.5%
Public Policy Polling	September 22–25, 2011	Barack Obama	50%	Newt Gingrich	42%	8	476	±4.5%
Public Policy Polling	September 22–25, 2011	Barack Obama	45%	Ron Paul	44%	1	476	±4.5%
Public Policy Polling	September 22–25, 2011	Barack Obama	50%	Rick Perry	43%	7	476	±4.5%
Public Policy Polling	September 22–25, 2011	Barack Obama	46%	Mitt Romney	45%	1	476	±4.5%
Quinnipiac University	September 14–19, 2011	Barack Obama	44%	Rick Perry	42%	2	1,007	±3.1%
Quinnipiac University	September 14–19, 2011	Barack Obama	40%	Mitt Romney	47%	7	1,007	±3.1%
Quinnipiac University	August 1–2, 2011	Barack Obama	50%	Michele Bachmann	38%	12	743 RV	±3.6%
Quinnipiac University	August 1–2, 2011	Barack Obama	53%	Sarah Palin	34%	19	743 RV	±3.6%
Quinnipiac University	August 1–2, 2011	Barack Obama	44%	Rick Perry	39%	5	743 RV	±3.6%
Quinnipiac University	August 1–2, 2011	Barack Obama	44%	Mitt Romney	44%	Tied	743 RV	±3.6%
Quinnipiac University	July 27–31, 2011	Barack Obama	50%	Michele Bachmann	36%	14	674 RV	±3.8%
Quinnipiac University	July 27–31, 2011	Barack Obama	54%	Sarah Palin	33%	21	674 RV	±3.8%
Quinnipiac University	July 27–31, 2011	Barack Obama	49%	Rick Perry	36%	13	674 RV	±3.8%
Quinnipiac University	July 27–31, 2011	Barack Obama	46%	Mitt Romney	41%	5	674 RV	±3.8%
Sunshine State News/Voter Survey Service	July 5–7, 2011	Barack Obama	42%	Mitt Romney	46%	4	1,000 LV	±3.10%
Public Policy Polling	June 16–19, 2011	Barack Obama	49%	Michele Bachmann	40%	9	848 RV	±3.4%
Public Policy Polling	June 16–19, 2011	Barack Obama	48%	Herman Cain	37%	11	848 RV	±3.4%
Public Policy Polling	June 16–19, 2011	Barack Obama	52%	Sarah Palin	40%	12	848 RV	±3.4%
Public Policy Polling	June 16–19, 2011	Barack Obama	48%	Tim Pawlenty	40%	8	848 RV	±3.4%
Public Policy Polling	June 16–19, 2011	Barack Obama	47%	Mitt Romney	43%	4	848 RV	±3.4%
Suffolk University/7 News	April 10–12, 2011	Barack Obama	42%	Mitt Romney	43%	1	600 RV	±4.0%
Suffolk University/7 News	April 10–12, 2011	Barack Obama	44%	Mike Huckabee	41%	3	600 RV	±4.0%
Suffolk University/7 News	April 10–12, 2011	Barack Obama	41%	Tim Pawlenty	28%	13	600 RV	±4.0%
Suffolk University/7 News	April 10–12, 2011	Barack Obama	45%	Michele Bachmann	30%	15	600 RV	±4.0%
Suffolk University/7 News	April 10–12, 2011	Barack Obama	47%	Newt Gingrich	36%	11	600 RV	±4.0%
Suffolk University/7 News	April 10–12, 2011	Barack Obama	52%	Sarah Palin	34%	18	600 RV	±4.0%
Suffolk University/7 News	April 10–12, 2011	Barack Obama	49%	Donald Trump	34%	15	600 RV	±4.0%
Suffolk University/7 News	April 10–12, 2011	Barack Obama	47%	Haley Barbour	26%	17	600 RV	±4.0%
Suffolk University/7 News	April 10–12, 2011	Barack Obama	48%	Ron Paul	30%	18	600 RV	±4.0%
Ron Sachs Communications/Mason-Dixon Polling & Research	April 4–7, 2011	Barack Obama	43%	Mitt Romney	48%	5	800 RV	±3.5%
Ron Sachs Communications/Mason-Dixon Polling & Research	April 4–7, 2011	Barack Obama	44%	Mike Huckabee	49%	5	800 RV	±3.5%
Ron Sachs Communications/Mason-Dixon Polling & Research	April 4–7, 2011	Barack Obama	51%	Sarah Palin	39%	12	800 RV	±3.5%
Ron Sachs Communications/Mason-Dixon Polling & Research	April 4–7, 2011	Barack Obama	48%	Donald Trump	40%	8	800 RV	±3.5%
Public Policy Polling	March 24–27, 2011	Barack Obama	50%	Newt Gingrich	42%	8	500 RV	±4.4%
Public Policy Polling	March 24–27, 2011	Barack Obama	50%	Mike Huckabee	43%	7	500 RV	±4.4%
Public Policy Polling	March 24–27, 2011	Barack Obama	52%	Sarah Palin	39%	13	500 RV	±4.4%
Public Policy Polling	March 24–27, 2011	Barack Obama	46%	Mitt Romney	44%	2	500 RV	±4.4%
Public Policy Polling	March 24–27, 2011	Barack Obama	48%	Jeb Bush	45%	3	500 RV	±4.4%
Public Policy Polling	March 24–27, 2011	Barack Obama	48%	Rudy Giuliani	42%	6	500 RV	±4.4%
Public Policy Polling	December 17–20, 2010	Barack Obama	47%	Newt Gingrich	42%	5	1,034 RV	±3.0%
Public Policy Polling	December 17–20, 2010	Barack Obama	49%	Mike Huckabee	44%	5	1,034 RV	±3.0%
Public Policy Polling	December 17–20, 2010	Barack Obama	52%	Sarah Palin	38%	14	1,034 RV	±3.0%
Public Policy Polling	December 17–20, 2010	Barack Obama	46%	Mitt Romney	44%	2	1,034 RV	±3.0%
Public Policy Polling	December 17–20, 2010	Barack Obama	48%	Marco Rubio	40%	8	1,034 RV	±3.0%

== Georgia ==
16 electoral votes
(Republican in 2004) 58%–41%
(Republican in 2008) 52%–47%

Poll source	Date administered	Democrat	%	Republican	%	Lead margin	Sample Size	Margin of error
Mason-Dixon Polling & Research	December 12–14, 2011	Barack Obama	41%	Newt Gingrich	50%	9	625	±4.0%
Mason-Dixon Polling & Research	December 12–14, 2011	Barack Obama	38%	Mitt Romney	55%	17	625	±4.0%
SurveyUSA	December 6–7, 2011	Barack Obama	42%	Newt Gingrich	48%	6	1,176	±2.9%
SurveyUSA	December 6–7, 2011	Barack Obama	42%	Mitt Romney	49%	7	1,176	±2.9%
Public Policy Polling	March 31 – April 3, 2011	Barack Obama	46%	Newt Gingrich	45%	1	790 RV	±3.5%
Public Policy Polling	March 31 – April 3, 2011	Barack Obama	45%	Mike Huckabee	48%	3	790 RV	±3.5%
Public Policy Polling	March 31 – April 3, 2011	Barack Obama	48%	Sarah Palin	43%	5	790 RV	±3.5%
Public Policy Polling	March 31 – April 3, 2011	Barack Obama	43%	Mitt Romney	46%	3	790 RV	±3.5%
Public Policy Polling	March 31 – April 3, 2011	Barack Obama	44%	Herman Cain	39%	5	790 RV	±3.5%

== Hawaii ==
4 electoral votes
(Democratic in 2004) 54%–45%
(Democratic in 2008) 72%–27%

Poll source	Date administered	Democrat	%	Republican	%	Lead margin	Sample Size	Margin of error
Public Policy Polling	October 13–16, 2011	Barack Obama	64%	Michele Bachmann	28%	36	568 RV	±4.1%
Public Policy Polling	October 13–16, 2011	Barack Obama	63%	Herman Cain	30%	33	568 RV	±4.1%
Public Policy Polling	October 13–16, 2011	Barack Obama	64%	Newt Gingrich	27%	37	568 RV	±4.1%
Public Policy Polling	October 13–16, 2011	Barack Obama	63%	Rick Perry	28%	35	568 RV	±4.1%
Public Policy Polling	October 13–16, 2011	Barack Obama	59%	Mitt Romney	32%	27	568 RV	±4.1%

== Illinois ==
20 electoral votes
(Democratic in 2004) 55%–45%
(Democratic in 2008) 62%–37%

Poll source	Date administered	Democrat	%	Republican	%	Lead margin	Sample Size	Margin of error
Paul Simon Public Policy Institute (Southern Illinois University)	October 11–16, 2011	Barack Obama	46.1%	Mitt Romney	38.5%	7.6	1,000 RV	±3%
Paul Simon Public Policy Institute (Southern Illinois University)	October 11–16, 2011	Barack Obama	49.3%	Ron Paul	30.3%	19	1,000 RV	±3%

== Iowa ==
6 electoral votes
(Republican in 2004) 50%–49%
(Democratic in 2008) 54%–44%

Poll source	Date administered	Democrat	%	Republican	%	Lead margin	Sample Size	Margin of error
NBC News/Marist College	November 27–29, 2011	Barack Obama	48%	Rick Perry	37%	11	1,393	±2.6%
NBC News/Marist College	November 27–29, 2011	Barack Obama	46%	Mitt Romney	39%	7	1,393	±2.6%
NBC News/Marist College	November 27–29, 2011	Barack Obama	54%	Michele Bachmann	31%	23	1,393	±2.6%
NBC News/Marist College	November 27–29, 2011	Barack Obama	47%	Newt Gingrich	37%	10	1,393	±2.6%
NBC News/Marist College	November 27–29, 2011	Barack Obama	50%	Herman Cain	32%	18	1,393	±2.6%
NBC News/Marist College	November 27–29, 2011	Barack Obama	42%	Ron Paul	42%	Tied	1,393	±2.6%
Public Policy Polling	October 7–10, 2011	Barack Obama	49%	Michele Bachmann	39%	10	749 RV	±3.6%
Public Policy Polling	October 7–10, 2011	Barack Obama	47%	Herman Cain	41%	6	749 RV	±3.6%
Public Policy Polling	October 7–10, 2011	Barack Obama	50%	Newt Gingrich	39%	11	749 RV	±3.6%
Public Policy Polling	October 7–10, 2011	Barack Obama	47%	Ron Paul	40%	7	749 RV	±3.6%
Public Policy Polling	October 7–10, 2011	Barack Obama	49%	Rick Perry	39%	10	749 RV	±3.6%
Public Policy Polling	October 7–10, 2011	Barack Obama	46%	Mitt Romney	42%	4	749 RV	±3.6%
NBC News/Marist College	October 3–5, 2011	Barack Obama	46%	Rick Perry	37%	9	2,836 RV	±1.8%
NBC News/Marist College	October 3–5, 2011	Barack Obama	43%	Mitt Romney	40%	3	2,836 RV	±1.8%
Public Policy Polling	August 19–21, 2011	Barack Obama	51%	Michele Bachmann	34%	17	798 RV	±3.5%
Public Policy Polling	August 19–21, 2011	Barack Obama	51%	Herman Cain	33%	18	798 RV	±3.5%
Public Policy Polling	August 19–21, 2011	Barack Obama	54%	Sarah Palin	33%	21	798 RV	±3.5%
Public Policy Polling	August 19–21, 2011	Barack Obama	51%	Rick Perry	38%	13	798 RV	±3.5%
Public Policy Polling	August 19–21, 2011	Barack Obama	49%	Mitt Romney	39%	10	798 RV	±3.5%
Every Child Matters Fund/Mason-Dixon Polling & Research	July 5–7, 2011	Barack Obama	47%	Michele Bachmann	46%	1	629 LV	±3.9%
Every Child Matters Fund/Mason-Dixon Polling & Research	July 5–7, 2011	Barack Obama	44%	Mitt Romney	47%	3	629 LV	±3.9%
Public Policy Polling	May 27–30, 2011	Barack Obama	50%	Herman Cain	32%	18	1,387 RV	±2.6%
Public Policy Polling	May 27–30, 2011	Barack Obama	54%	Newt Gingrich	33%	21	1,387 RV	±2.6%
Public Policy Polling	May 27–30, 2011	Barack Obama	55%	Sarah Palin	35%	20	1,387 RV	±2.6%
Public Policy Polling	May 27–30, 2011	Barack Obama	49%	Tim Pawlenty	37%	12	1,387 RV	±2.6%
Public Policy Polling	May 27–30, 2011	Barack Obama	49%	Mitt Romney	40%	9	1,387 RV	±2.6%
Public Policy Polling	April 15–17, 2011	Barack Obama	50%	Newt Gingrich	39%	11	1,109 RV	±2.9%
Public Policy Polling	April 15–17, 2011	Barack Obama	45%	Mike Huckabee	45%	Tied	1,109 RV	±2.9%
Public Policy Polling	April 15–17, 2011	Barack Obama	53%	Sarah Palin	36%	17	1,109 RV	±2.9%
Public Policy Polling	April 15–17, 2011	Barack Obama	45%	Mitt Romney	41%	4	1,109 RV	±2.9%
Public Policy Polling	April 15–17, 2011	Barack Obama	51%	Donald Trump	35%	16	1,109 RV	±2.9%
Public Policy Polling	January 7–9, 2011	Barack Obama	51%	Newt Gingrich	38%	13	1,077 RV	±3.0%
Public Policy Polling	January 7–9, 2011	Barack Obama	47%	Mike Huckabee	43%	4	1,077 RV	±3.0%
Public Policy Polling	January 7–9, 2011	Barack Obama	53%	Sarah Palin	37%	16	1,077 RV	±3.0%
Public Policy Polling	January 7–9, 2011	Barack Obama	47%	Mitt Romney	41%	6	1,077 RV	±3.0%

== Kansas ==
6 electoral votes
(Republican in 2004) 62%–37%
(Republican in 2008) 57%–42%

Poll source	Date administered	Democrat	%	Republican	%	Lead margin	Sample Size	Margin of error
KWCH-TV Wichita/Survey USA	November 10, 2011	Barack Obama	35%	Newt Gingrich	52%	17	800 RV	±3.5%
KWCH-TV Wichita/Survey USA	November 10, 2011	Barack Obama	31%	Mitt Romney	56%	25	800 RV	±3.5%

== Kentucky ==
8 electoral votes
(Republican in 2004) 60%–40%
(Republican in 2008) 57%–41%

Poll source	Date administered	Democrat	%	Republican	%	Lead margin	Sample Size	Margin of error
Public Policy Polling	August 25–28, 2011	Barack Obama	43%	Michele Bachmann	46%	3	600 RV	±4.0%
Public Policy Polling	August 25–28, 2011	Barack Obama	47%	Newt Gingrich	44%	3	600 RV	±4.0%
Public Policy Polling	August 25–28, 2011	Barack Obama	48%	Sarah Palin	44%	4	600 RV	±4.0%
Public Policy Polling	August 25–28, 2011	Barack Obama	42%	Rick Perry	49%	7	600 RV	±4.0%
Public Policy Polling	August 25–28, 2011	Barack Obama	40%	Mitt Romney	48%	8	600 RV	±4.0%

== Louisiana ==
8 electoral votes
(Republican in 2004) 57%–42%
(Republican in 2008) 59%–40%

Poll source	Date administered	Democrat	%	Republican	%	Lead margin	Sample Size	Margin of error
Clarus Research Group	October 5–7, 2011	Barack Obama	37%	Mitt Romney	53%	16	602 RV	±4.0%
Clarus Research Group	October 5–7, 2011	Barack Obama	37%	Rick Perry	52%	15	602 RV	±4.0%
Public Policy Polling	July 17–19, 2009	Barack Obama	42%	Sarah Palin	49%	7	727 RV	±3.6%
Public Policy Polling	July 17–19, 2009	Barack Obama	40%	Bobby Jindal	54%	14	727 RV	±3.6%

== Maine ==
4 electoral votes
(Democratic in 2004) 53%–45%
(Democratic in 2008) 58%–40%

Poll source	Date administered	Democrat	%	Republican	%	Lead margin	Sample Size	Margin of error
Public Policy Polling	October 28–31, 2011	Barack Obama	55%	Michele Bachmann	35%	20	673 RV	±3.8%
Public Policy Polling	October 28–31, 2011	Barack Obama	54%	Herman Cain	37%	17	673 RV	±3.8%
Public Policy Polling	October 28–31, 2011	Barack Obama	55%	Newt Gingrich	35%	20	673 RV	±3.8%
Public Policy Polling	October 28–31, 2011	Barack Obama	55%	Rick Perry	34%	21	673 RV	±3.8%
Public Policy Polling	October 28–31, 2011	Barack Obama	49%	Mitt Romney	38%	11	673 RV	±3.8%
Bangor Daily News/Critical Insights	October 18–23, 2011	Barack Obama	41%	Mitt Romney	40%	1	600 RV	±4.0%
Bangor Daily News/Critical Insights	October 18–23, 2011	Barack Obama	46%	Rick Perry	32%	14	600 RV	±4.0%
Public Policy Polling	March 3–6, 2011	Barack Obama	53%	Newt Gingrich	37%	16	1,247 RV	±2.8%
Public Policy Polling	March 3–6, 2011	Barack Obama	51%	Mike Huckabee	39%	12	1,247 RV	±2.8%
Public Policy Polling	March 3–6, 2011	Barack Obama	57%	Sarah Palin	35%	22	1,247 RV	±2.8%
Public Policy Polling	March 3–6, 2011	Barack Obama	49%	Mitt Romney	41%	8	1,247 RV	±2.8%

== Massachusetts ==
11 electoral votes
(Democratic in 2004) 62%–37%
(Democratic in 2008) 62%–36%

Poll source	Date administered	Democrat	%	Republican	%	Lead margin	Sample Size	Margin of error
University of Massachusetts Amherst/YouGov	November 9–22, 2011	Barack Obama	54%	Rick Perry	23%	31	222 RV	Not reported
University of Massachusetts Amherst/YouGov	November 9–22, 2011	Barack Obama	51%	Herman Cain	28%	23	228 RV	Not reported
University of Massachusetts Amherst/YouGov	November 9–22, 2011	Barack Obama	49%	Mitt Romney	34%	15	446 RV	±4.6%
Public Policy Polling	September 16–18, 2011	Barack Obama	59%	Michele Bachmann	28%	31	791 RV	±3.5%
Public Policy Polling	September 16–18, 2011	Barack Obama	58%	Newt Gingrich	31%	27	791 RV	±3.5%
Public Policy Polling	September 16–18, 2011	Barack Obama	55%	Ron Paul	30%	25	791 RV	±3.5%
Public Policy Polling	September 16–18, 2011	Barack Obama	58%	Rick Perry	32%	26	791 RV	±3.5%
Public Policy Polling	September 16–18, 2011	Barack Obama	53%	Mitt Romney	40%	13	791 RV	±3.5%
Public Policy Polling	June 2–5, 2011	Barack Obama	60%	Herman Cain	27%	33	957 RV	±3.2%
Public Policy Polling	June 2–5, 2011	Barack Obama	63%	Newt Gingrich	27%	36	957 RV	±3.2%
Public Policy Polling	June 2–5, 2011	Barack Obama	63%	Sarah Palin	27%	36	957 RV	±3.2%
Public Policy Polling	June 2–5, 2011	Barack Obama	59%	Tim Pawlenty	28%	31	957 RV	±3.2%
Public Policy Polling	June 2–5, 2011	Barack Obama	57%	Mitt Romney	37%	20	957 RV	±3.2%
Public Policy Polling	November 29 – December 1, 2010	Barack Obama	57%	Newt Gingrich	33%	24	500 RV	±4.4%
Public Policy Polling	November 29 – December 1, 2010	Barack Obama	57%	Mike Huckabee	33%	24	500 RV	±4.4%
Public Policy Polling	November 29 – December 1, 2010	Barack Obama	61%	Sarah Palin	32%	29	500 RV	±4.4%
Public Policy Polling	November 29 – December 1, 2010	Barack Obama	52%	Mitt Romney	43%	9	500 RV	±4.4%

== Michigan ==
16 electoral votes
(Democratic in 2004) 51%–48%
(Democratic in 2008) 57%–41%

Poll source	Date administered	Democrat	%	Republican	%	Lead margin	Sample Size	Margin of error
Detroit Free Press/EPIC-MRA	November 13–16, 2011	Barack Obama	41%	Mitt Romney	46%	5	600 LV	±4%
Detroit Free Press/EPIC-MRA	November 13–16, 2011	Barack Obama	45%	Newt Gingrich	40%	5	600 LV	±4%
Detroit Free Press/EPIC-MRA	November 13–16, 2011	Barack Obama	50%	Herman Cain	36%	14	600 LV	±4%
SurveyUSA	October 12–14, 2011	Barack Obama	56%	Michele Bachmann	30%	26	500 LV	±4.5%
SurveyUSA	October 12–14, 2011	Barack Obama	53%	Herman Cain	32%	21	500 LV	±4.5%
SurveyUSA	October 12–14, 2011	Barack Obama	54%	Newt Gingrich	31%	23	500 LV	±4.5%
SurveyUSA	October 12–14, 2011	Barack Obama	53%	Rick Perry	32%	21	500 LV	±4.5%
SurveyUSA	October 12–14, 2011	Barack Obama	50%	Mitt Romney	39%	11	500 LV	±4.5%
Inside Michigan/Marketing Resource Group	Sept 14–19, 2011	Barack Obama	50%	Rick Perry	39%	11	600 LV	±4%
Inside Michigan/Marketing Resource Group	Sept 14–19, 2011	Barack Obama	44%	Mitt Romney	44%	Tied	600 LV	±4%
Public Policy Polling	July 21–24, 2011	Barack Obama	53%	Michele Bachmann	37%	16	593 RV	±4.0%
Public Policy Polling	July 21–24, 2011	Barack Obama	50%	Herman Cain	33%	17	593 RV	±4.0%
Public Policy Polling	July 21–24, 2011	Barack Obama	54%	Sarah Palin	36%	18	593 RV	±4.0%
Public Policy Polling	July 21–24, 2011	Barack Obama	50%	Rick Perry	35%	15	593 RV	±4.0%
Public Policy Polling	July 21–24, 2011	Barack Obama	47%	Mitt Romney	42%	5	593 RV	±4.0%
Public Policy Polling	July 21–24, 2011	Barack Obama	50%	Thaddeus McCotter	31%	19	593 RV	±4.0%
EPIC-MRA	July 9–11, 2011	Barack Obama	42%	Mitt Romney	46%	4	600 LV	±4.0%
Public Policy Polling	March 18–20, 2011	Barack Obama	53%	Newt Gingrich	37%	16	502 RV	±4.4%
Public Policy Polling	March 18–20, 2011	Barack Obama	50%	Mike Huckabee	41%	9	502 RV	±4.4%
Public Policy Polling	March 18–20, 2011	Barack Obama	55%	Sarah Palin	35%	20	502 RV	±4.4%
Public Policy Polling	March 18–20, 2011	Barack Obama	48%	Mitt Romney	41%	7	502 RV	±4.4%
Public Policy Polling	March 18–20, 2011	Barack Obama	52%	Scott Walker	32%	20	502 RV	±4.4%
EPIC-MRA	February 12–17, 2011	Barack Obama	41%	Mitt Romney	46%	5	600 LV	±4.0%
Public Policy Polling	December 3–6, 2010	Barack Obama	52%	Newt Gingrich	37%	15	1,224 RV	±2.8%
Public Policy Polling	December 3–6, 2010	Barack Obama	51%	Mike Huckabee	39%	12	1,224 RV	±2.8%
Public Policy Polling	December 3–6, 2010	Barack Obama	56%	Sarah Palin	35%	21	1,224 RV	±2.8%
Public Policy Polling	December 3–6, 2010	Barack Obama	47%	Mitt Romney	43%	4	1,224 RV	±2.8%
Public Policy Polling	December 3–6, 2010	Barack Obama	49%	Rick Snyder	38%	11	1,224 RV	±2.8%

== Minnesota ==
10 electoral votes
(Democratic in 2004) 51%–48%
(Democratic in 2008) 54%–44%

Poll source	Date administered	Democrat	%	Republican	%	Lead margin	Sample Size	Margin of error
KSTP-TV Minneapolis/SurveyUSA	November 2–6, 2011	Barack Obama	57%	Michele Bachmann	29%	28	543 RV	±4.3%
KSTP-TV Minneapolis/SurveyUSA	November 2–6, 2011	Barack Obama	48%	Herman Cain	35%	13	543 RV	±4.3%
KSTP-TV Minneapolis/SurveyUSA	November 2–6, 2011	Barack Obama	48%	Rick Perry	35%	13	543 RV	±4.3%
KSTP-TV Minneapolis/SurveyUSA	November 2–6, 2011	Barack Obama	45%	Mitt Romney	39%	6	543 RV	±4.3%
KSTP-TV Minneapolis/SurveyUSA	June 15–17, 2011	Barack Obama	53%	Michele Bachmann	39%	14	558 RV	±4.2%
KSTP-TV Minneapolis/SurveyUSA	June 15–17, 2011	Barack Obama	46%	Tim Pawlenty	46%	Tied	558 RV	±4.2%
Public Policy Polling	May 27–30, 2011	Barack Obama	56%	Michele Bachmann	35%	21	1,179 RV	±2.9%
Public Policy Polling	May 27–30, 2011	Barack Obama	51%	Herman Cain	30%	21	1,179 RV	±2.9%
Public Policy Polling	May 27–30, 2011	Barack Obama	54%	Newt Gingrich	36%	18	1,179 RV	±2.9%
Public Policy Polling	May 27–30, 2011	Barack Obama	56%	Sarah Palin	36%	20	1,179 RV	±2.9%
Public Policy Polling	May 27–30, 2011	Barack Obama	51%	Tim Pawlenty	43%	8	1,179 RV	±2.9%
Public Policy Polling	May 27–30, 2011	Barack Obama	51%	Mitt Romney	36%	15	1,179 RV	±2.9%
Public Policy Polling	December 4–5, 2010	Barack Obama	51%	Newt Gingrich	38%	13	949 RV	±3.2%
Public Policy Polling	December 4–5, 2010	Barack Obama	50%	Mike Huckabee	40%	10	949 RV	±3.2%
Public Policy Polling	December 4–5, 2010	Barack Obama	54%	Sarah Palin	36%	18	949 RV	±3.2%
Public Policy Polling	December 4–5, 2010	Barack Obama	47%	Mitt Romney	42%	5	949 RV	±3.2%
Public Policy Polling	December 4–5, 2010	Barack Obama	51%	Tim Pawlenty	43%	8	949 RV	±3.2%
St. Cloud State University	October 24 – November 4, 2009	Barack Obama	49%	Tim Pawlenty	40%	9	550	±5.0%
Public Policy Polling	July 7–8, 2009	Barack Obama	56%	Sarah Palin	35%	21	1,491	±2.5%
Public Policy Polling	July 7–8, 2009	Barack Obama	51%	Tim Pawlenty	40%	11	1,491	±2.5%

== Mississippi ==
6 electoral votes
(Republican in 2004) 59%–40%
(Republican in 2008) 56%–43%

Poll source	Date administered	Democrat	%	Republican	%	Lead margin	Sample Size	Margin of error
Public Policy Polling	November 4–6, 2011	Barack Obama	40%	Michele Bachmann	52%	12	796 RV	±3.5%
Public Policy Polling	November 4–6, 2011	Barack Obama	37%	Herman Cain	54%	17	796 RV	±3.5%
Public Policy Polling	November 4–6, 2011	Barack Obama	38%	Newt Gingrich	54%	16	796 RV	±3.5%
Public Policy Polling	November 4–6, 2011	Barack Obama	37%	Ron Paul	52%	15	796 RV	±3.5%
Public Policy Polling	November 4–6, 2011	Barack Obama	38%	Rick Perry	55%	17	796 RV	±3.5%
Public Policy Polling	November 4–6, 2011	Barack Obama	36%	Mitt Romney	54%	18	796 RV	±3.5%
Public Policy Polling	March 24–27, 2011	Barack Obama	42%	Newt Gingrich	48%	6	817 RV	±3.4%
Public Policy Polling	March 24–27, 2011	Barack Obama	40%	Mike Huckabee	54%	14	817 RV	±3.4%
Public Policy Polling	March 24–27, 2011	Barack Obama	44%	Sarah Palin	48%	4	817 RV	±3.4%
Public Policy Polling	March 24–27, 2011	Barack Obama	40%	Mitt Romney	46%	6	817 RV	±3.4%
Public Policy Polling	March 24–27, 2011	Barack Obama	41%	Haley Barbour	51%	10	817 RV	±3.4%

== Missouri ==
10 electoral votes
(Republican in 2004) 53%–46%
(Republican in 2008) 49%–49%

Poll source	Date administered	Democrat	%	Republican	%	Lead margin	Sample Size	Margin of error
Rasmussen Reports/Pulse Opinion Research	November 9, 2011	Barack Obama	47%	Herman Cain	39%	8	500 LV	±4.5%
Rasmussen Reports/Pulse Opinion Research	November 9, 2011	Barack Obama	47%	Rick Perry	43%	4	500 LV	±4.5%
Rasmussen Reports/Pulse Opinion Research	November 9, 2011	Barack Obama	42%	Mitt Romney	45%	3	500 LV	±4.5%
Public Policy Polling	September 9–12, 2011	Barack Obama	47%	Michele Bachmann	43%	4	632 RV	±3.9%
Public Policy Polling	September 9–12, 2011	Barack Obama	47%	Newt Gingrich	45%	2	632 RV	±3.9%
Public Policy Polling	September 9–12, 2011	Barack Obama	45%	Rick Perry	47%	2	632 RV	±3.9%
Public Policy Polling	September 9–12, 2011	Barack Obama	43%	Mitt Romney	47%	4	632 RV	±3.9%
Public Policy Polling	April 28 – May 1, 2011	Barack Obama	46%	Newt Gingrich	44%	2	555 RV	±3.9%
Public Policy Polling	April 28 – May 1, 2011	Barack Obama	44%	Mike Huckabee	49%	5	555 RV	±3.9%
Public Policy Polling	April 28 – May 1, 2011	Barack Obama	48%	Sarah Palin	43%	5	555 RV	±3.9%
Public Policy Polling	April 28 – May 1, 2011	Barack Obama	43%	Mitt Romney	45%	2	555 RV	±3.9%
Public Policy Polling	April 28 – May 1, 2011	Barack Obama	46%	Donald Trump	41%	5	555 RV	±3.9%
Public Policy Polling	March 3–6, 2011	Barack Obama	44%	Newt Gingrich	44%	Tied	612 RV	±4.0%
Public Policy Polling	March 3–6, 2011	Barack Obama	43%	Mike Huckabee	49%	6	612 RV	±4.0%
Public Policy Polling	March 3–6, 2011	Barack Obama	48%	Sarah Palin	43%	5	612 RV	±4.0%
Public Policy Polling	March 3–6, 2011	Barack Obama	43%	Mitt Romney	44%	1	612 RV	±4.0%
Public Policy Polling	November 29 – December 1, 2010	Barack Obama	44%	Newt Gingrich	45%	1	515 RV	±4.3%
Public Policy Polling	November 29 – December 1, 2010	Barack Obama	42%	Mike Huckabee	49%	7	515 RV	±4.3%
Public Policy Polling	November 29 – December 1, 2010	Barack Obama	46%	Sarah Palin	43%	3	515 RV	±4.3%
Public Policy Polling	November 29 – December 1, 2010	Barack Obama	41%	Mitt Romney	47%	6	515 RV	±4.3%

== Montana ==
3 electoral votes
(Republican in 2004) 59%–39%
(Republican in 2008) 49%–47%

Poll source	Date administered	Democrat	%	Republican	%	Lead margin	Sample Size	Margin of error
Public Policy Polling	November 28–30, 2011	Barack Obama	43%	Herman Cain	45%	2	1,625 RV	±2.4%
Public Policy Polling	November 28–30, 2011	Barack Obama	42%	Newt Gingrich	50%	8	1,625 RV	±2.4%
Public Policy Polling	November 28–30, 2011	Barack Obama	40%	Ron Paul	48%	8	1,625 RV	±2.4%
Public Policy Polling	November 28–30, 2011	Barack Obama	40%	Mitt Romney	50%	10	1,625 RV	±2.4%
Public Policy Polling	November 28–30, 2011	Barack Obama	43%	Rick Perry	46%	3	1,625 RV	±2.4%
Public Policy Polling	June 16–19, 2011	Barack Obama	42%	Michele Bachmann	48%	6	819 RV	±3.4%
Public Policy Polling	June 16–19, 2011	Barack Obama	41%	Herman Cain	46%	5	819 RV	±3.4%
Public Policy Polling	June 16–19, 2011	Barack Obama	44%	Sarah Palin	48%	4	819 RV	±3.4%
Public Policy Polling	June 16–19, 2011	Barack Obama	41%	Tim Pawlenty	45%	4	819 RV	±3.4%
Public Policy Polling	June 16–19, 2011	Barack Obama	41%	Mitt Romney	49%	8	819 RV	±3.4%
Public Policy Polling	November 10–13, 2010	Barack Obama	44%	Newt Gingrich	46%	2	1,176 RV	±2.9%
Public Policy Polling	November 10–13, 2010	Barack Obama	41%	Mike Huckabee	51%	10	1,176 RV	±2.9%
Public Policy Polling	November 10–13, 2010	Barack Obama	45%	Sarah Palin	47%	2	1,176 RV	±2.9%
Public Policy Polling	November 10–13, 2010	Barack Obama	39%	Mitt Romney	50%	11	1,176 RV	±2.9%

== Nebraska ==
5 electoral votes
(Republican in 2004) 66%–33%
(Republican in 2008) 57%–42%

Poll source	Date administered	Democrat	%	Republican	%	Lead margin	Sample Size	Margin of error
Public Policy Polling	September 30 – October 2, 2011	Barack Obama	41%	Michele Bachmann	49%	8	739 RV	±3.6%
Public Policy Polling	September 30 – October 2, 2011	Barack Obama	41%	Newt Gingrich	48%	7	739 RV	±3.6%
Public Policy Polling	September 30 – October 2, 2011	Barack Obama	41%	Rick Perry	48%	7	739 RV	±3.6%
Public Policy Polling	September 30 – October 2, 2011	Barack Obama	38%	Mitt Romney	51%	13	739 RV	±3.6%
Public Policy Polling	January 26–27, 2011	Barack Obama	40%	Newt Gingrich	48%	8	977 RV	±3.1%
Public Policy Polling	January 26–27, 2011	Barack Obama	38%	Mike Huckabee	51%	13	977 RV	±3.1%
Public Policy Polling	January 26–27, 2011	Barack Obama	44%	Sarah Palin	45%	1	977 RV	±3.1%
Public Policy Polling	January 26–27, 2011	Barack Obama	37%	Mitt Romney	49%	12	977 RV	±3.1%

== Nevada ==
6 electoral votes
(Republican in 2004) 51%–48%
(Democratic in 2008) 55%–43%

Poll source	Date administered	Democrat	%	Republican	%	Lead margin	Sample Size	Margin of error
Las Vegas Review-Journal/University of Nevada Las Vegas	December 12–20, 2011	Barack Obama	45.7%	Mitt Romney	39.8%	5.9	600 RV	±4.0%
Las Vegas Review-Journal/University of Nevada Las Vegas	December 12–20, 2011	Barack Obama	45.4%	Ron Paul	35.7%	9.7	600 RV	±4.0%
Las Vegas Review-Journal/University of Nevada Las Vegas	December 12–20, 2011	Barack Obama	47.3%	Newt Gingrich	35.4%	11.9	600 RV	±4.0%
Las Vegas Review-Journal/University of Nevada Las Vegas	December 12–20, 2011	Barack Obama	50.2%	Michele Bachmann	27.1%	23.1	600 RV	±4.0%
Las Vegas Review-Journal/University of Nevada Las Vegas	December 12–20, 2011	Barack Obama	48.8%	Jon Huntsman	30.1%	18.7	600 RV	±4.0%
Las Vegas Review-Journal/University of Nevada Las Vegas	December 12–20, 2011	Barack Obama	50.8%	Rick Perry	31.1%	19.7	600 RV	±4.0%
Las Vegas Review-Journal/University of Nevada Las Vegas	December 12–20, 2011	Barack Obama	49.3%	Rick Santorum	30.9%	18.4	600 RV	±4.0%
Public Policy Polling	October 20–23, 2011	Barack Obama	49%	Michele Bachmann	41%	8	500 RV	±4.4%
Public Policy Polling	October 20–23, 2011	Barack Obama	49%	Herman Cain	46%	3	500 RV	±4.4%
Public Policy Polling	October 20–23, 2011	Barack Obama	49%	Newt Gingrich	46%	3	500 RV	±4.4%
Public Policy Polling	October 20–23, 2011	Barack Obama	51%	Rick Perry	41%	10	500 RV	±4.4%
Public Policy Polling	October 20–23, 2011	Barack Obama	46%	Mitt Romney	46%	Tied	500 RV	±4.4%
Public Policy Polling	July 28–31, 2011	Barack Obama	50%	Michele Bachmann	40%	10	601 RV	±4.0%
Public Policy Polling	July 28–31, 2011	Barack Obama	48%	Herman Cain	39%	9	601 RV	±4.0%
Public Policy Polling	July 28–31, 2011	Barack Obama	51%	Sarah Palin	39%	12	601 RV	±4.0%
Public Policy Polling	July 28–31, 2011	Barack Obama	49%	Rick Perry	40%	9	601 RV	±4.0%
Public Policy Polling	July 28–31, 2011	Barack Obama	47%	Mitt Romney	46%	1	601 RV	±4.0%
Public Policy Polling	April 21–24, 2011	Barack Obama	46%	Newt Gingrich	42%	4	491 RV	±4.4%
Public Policy Polling	April 21–24, 2011	Barack Obama	45%	Mike Huckabee	43%	2	491 RV	±4.4%
Public Policy Polling	April 21–24, 2011	Barack Obama	50%	Sarah Palin	39%	11	491 RV	±4.4%
Public Policy Polling	April 21–24, 2011	Barack Obama	43%	Mitt Romney	46%	3	491 RV	±4.4%
Public Policy Polling	April 21–24, 2011	Barack Obama	47%	Donald Trump	41%	6	491 RV	±4.4%
Public Policy Polling	January 3–5, 2011	Barack Obama	51%	Newt Gingrich	40%	11	932 RV	±3.2%
Public Policy Polling	January 3–5, 2011	Barack Obama	51%	Mike Huckabee	41%	10	932 RV	±3.2%
Public Policy Polling	January 3–5, 2011	Barack Obama	52%	Sarah Palin	39%	13	932 RV	±3.2%
Public Policy Polling	January 3–5, 2011	Barack Obama	47%	Mitt Romney	46%	1	932 RV	±3.2%

== New Hampshire ==
4 electoral votes
(Democratic in 2004) 50%–49%
(Democratic in 2008) 54%–45%

Poll source	Date administered	Democrat	%	Republican	%	Lead margin	Sample Size	Margin of error
NBC News/Marist College	November 28–30, 2011	Barack Obama	51%	Rick Perry	36%	15	1,144 RV	±2.9%
NBC News/Marist College	November 28–30, 2011	Barack Obama	43%	Mitt Romney	46%	3	1,144 RV	±2.9%
NBC News/Marist College	November 28–30, 2011	Barack Obama	53%	Michele Bachmann	33%	20	1,144 RV	±2.9%
NBC News/Marist College	November 28–30, 2011	Barack Obama	49%	Newt Gingrich	39%	10	1,144 RV	±2.9%
NBC News/Marist College	November 28–30, 2011	Barack Obama	53%	Herman Cain	30%	23	1,144 RV	±2.9%
NBC News/Marist College	November 28–30, 2011	Barack Obama	44%	Ron Paul	42%	2	1,144 RV	±2.9%
WMUR/University of New Hampshire	November 15–20, 2011	Barack Obama	54%	Rick Perry	35%	19	606 LV	±4%
WMUR/University of New Hampshire	November 15–20, 2011	Barack Obama	52%	Newt Gingrich	40%	12	606 LV	±4%
WMUR/University of New Hampshire	November 15–20, 2011	Barack Obama	44%	Mitt Romney	47%	3	606 LV	±4%
NBC News/Marist College	October 3–5, 2011	Barack Obama	46%	Rick Perry	40%	6	2,218 RV	±2.1%
NBC News/Marist College	October 3–5, 2011	Barack Obama	40%	Mitt Romney	49%	9	2,218 RV	±2.1%
Public Policy Polling	June 30 – July 5, 2011	Barack Obama	49%	Michele Bachmann	42%	7	662 RV	±3.8%
Public Policy Polling	June 30 – July 5, 2011	Barack Obama	49%	Herman Cain	39%	10	662 RV	±3.8%
Public Policy Polling	June 30 – July 5, 2011	Barack Obama	53%	Sarah Palin	38%	15	662 RV	±3.8%
Public Policy Polling	June 30 – July 5, 2011	Barack Obama	48%	Tim Pawlenty	41%	7	662 RV	±3.8%
Public Policy Polling	June 30 – July 5, 2011	Barack Obama	44%	Mitt Romney	46%	2	662 RV	±3.8%
WMUR/University of New Hampshire	June 21 – July 1, 2011	Barack Obama	43%	Mitt Romney	47%	4	773 A	±3.5%
WMUR/University of New Hampshire	June 21 – July 1, 2011	Barack Obama	47%	Tim Pawlenty	38%	11	773 A	±3.5%
WMUR/University of New Hampshire	June 21 – July 1, 2011	Barack Obama	47%	Michele Bachmann	41%	6	773 A	±3.5%
Public Policy Polling	March 31 – April 3, 2011	Barack Obama	52%	Newt Gingrich	39%	13	769 RV	±3.5%
Public Policy Polling	March 31 – April 3, 2011	Barack Obama	52%	Mike Huckabee	38%	14	769 RV	±3.5%
Public Policy Polling	March 31 – April 3, 2011	Barack Obama	56%	Sarah Palin	34%	22	769 RV	±3.5%
Public Policy Polling	March 31 – April 3, 2011	Barack Obama	47%	Mitt Romney	46%	1	769 RV	±3.5%
Public Policy Polling	March 31 – April 3, 2011	Barack Obama	51%	Donald Trump	37%	14	769 RV	±3.5%
Magellan Strategies	February 9–10, 2011	Barack Obama	48%	Mitt Romney	44%	4	789 LV	±3.49%
Magellan Strategies	February 9–10, 2011	Barack Obama	57%	Sarah Palin	34%	23	789 LV	±3.49%
Magellan Strategies	February 9–10, 2011	Barack Obama	51%	Mike Huckabee	38%	13	789 LV	±3.49%
Magellan Strategies	February 9–10, 2011	Barack Obama	56%	Newt Gingrich	33%	23	789 LV	±3.49%

== New Jersey ==
14 electoral votes
(Democratic in 2004) 52%–46%
(Democratic in 2008) 57%–42%

Poll source	Date administered	Democrat	%	Republican	%	Lead margin	Sample Size	Margin of error
Public Policy Polling	January 6–9, 2011	Barack Obama	55%	Chris Christie	38%	17	520 RV	±4.3%
Public Policy Polling	January 6–9, 2011	Barack Obama	54%	Newt Gingrich	37%	17	520 RV	±4.3%
Public Policy Polling	January 6–9, 2011	Barack Obama	53%	Mike Huckabee	36%	17	520 RV	±4.3%
Public Policy Polling	January 6–9, 2011	Barack Obama	59%	Sarah Palin	29%	30	520 RV	±4.3%
Public Policy Polling	January 6–9, 2011	Barack Obama	52%	Mitt Romney	37%	15	520 RV	±4.3%

== New Mexico ==
5 electoral votes
(Republican in 2004) 50%–49%
(Democratic in 2008) 57%–42%

Poll source	Date administered	Democrat	%	Republican	%	Lead margin	Sample Size	Margin of error
Public Policy Polling	December 10–12, 2011	Barack Obama	56%	Newt Gingrich	39%	17	500 RV	±4.4%
Public Policy Polling	December 10–12, 2011	Barack Obama	56%	Michele Bachmann	36%	20	500 RV	±4.4%
Public Policy Polling	December 10–12, 2011	Barack Obama	51%	Ron Paul	38%	13	500 RV	±4.4%
Public Policy Polling	December 10–12, 2011	Barack Obama	53%	Mitt Romney	38%	15	500 RV	±4.4%
Public Policy Polling	December 10–12, 2011	Barack Obama	56%	Rick Perry	35%	21	500 RV	±4.4%
Public Policy Polling	June 23–26, 2011	Barack Obama	52%	Michele Bachmann	37%	15	732 RV	±3.6%
Public Policy Polling	June 23–26, 2011	Barack Obama	52%	Herman Cain	36%	16	732 RV	±3.6%
Public Policy Polling	June 23–26, 2011	Barack Obama	46%	Gary Johnson	43%	3	732 RV	±3.6%
Public Policy Polling	June 23–26, 2011	Barack Obama	56%	Sarah Palin	36%	20	732 RV	±3.6%
Public Policy Polling	June 23–26, 2011	Barack Obama	51%	Tim Pawlenty	36%	15	732 RV	±3.6%
Public Policy Polling	June 23–26, 2011	Barack Obama	49%	Mitt Romney	42%	7	732 RV	±3.6%
Public Policy Polling	February 4–6, 2011	Barack Obama	56%	Newt Gingrich	35%	21	545 RV	±4.2%
Public Policy Polling	February 4–6, 2011	Barack Obama	55%	Mike Huckabee	36%	19	545 RV	±4.2%
Public Policy Polling	February 4–6, 2011	Barack Obama	51%	Gary Johnson	36%	15	545 RV	±4.2%
Public Policy Polling	February 4–6, 2011	Barack Obama	62%	Sarah Palin	33%	29	545 RV	±4.2%
Public Policy Polling	February 4–6, 2011	Barack Obama	53%	Mitt Romney	37%	16	545 RV	±4.2%

Three Way race

Poll source	Date administered	Democrat	%	Republican	%	Libertarian	%	Lead margin	Sample Size	Margin of error
Public Policy Polling	December 10–12, 2011	Barack Obama	45%	Newt Gingrich	28%	Gary Johnson	20%	17	500 RV	±4.4%
Public Policy Polling	December 10–12, 2011	Barack Obama	44%	Mitt Romney	27%	Gary Johnson	23%	17	500 RV	±4.4%

== New York ==
29 electoral votes
(Democratic in 2004) 58%–40%
(Democratic in 2008) 63%–36%

Poll source	Date administered	Democrat	%	Republican	%	Lead margin	Sample Size	Margin of error
Siena College	November 8–13, 2011	Barack Obama	63%	Herman Cain	27%	36	803 RV	±3.5%
Siena College	November 8–13, 2011	Barack Obama	63%	Rick Perry	28%	35	803 RV	±3.5%
Siena College	November 8–13, 2011	Barack Obama	59%	Mitt Romney	34%	25	803 RV	±3.5%
Siena College	November 8–13, 2011	Barack Obama	64%	Michele Bachmann	27%	37	803 RV	±3.5%
Siena College	November 8–13, 2011	Barack Obama	60%	Ron Paul	31%	29	803 RV	±3.5%
Marist College	October 25–27, 2011	Barack Obama	62%	Herman Cain	31%	31	1,030 RV	±3.0%
Marist College	October 25–27, 2011	Barack Obama	64%	Rick Perry	29%	35	1,030 RV	±3.0%
Marist College	October 25–27, 2011	Barack Obama	59%	Mitt Romney	35%	24	1,030 RV	±3.0%
Siena College	October 10–12, 2011	Barack Obama	58%	Herman Cain	32%	26	800 RV	±3.5%
Siena College	October 10–12, 2011	Barack Obama	58%	Rick Perry	31%	27	800 RV	±3.5%
Siena College	October 10–12, 2011	Barack Obama	55%	Mitt Romney	37%	18	800 RV	±3.5%

== North Carolina ==
15 electoral votes
(Republican in 2004) 56%–44%
(Democratic in 2008) 50%–49%

Poll source	Date administered	Democrat	%	Republican	%	Lead margin	Sample Size	Margin of error
Public Policy Polling	December 1–4, 2011	Barack Obama	50%	Herman Cain	37%	13	865 RV	±3.3%
Public Policy Polling	December 1–4, 2011	Barack Obama	49%	Newt Gingrich	45%	4	865 RV	±3.3%
Public Policy Polling	December 1–4, 2011	Barack Obama	47%	Ron Paul	42%	5	865 RV	±3.3%
Public Policy Polling	December 1–4, 2011	Barack Obama	50%	Rick Perry	42%	8	865 RV	±3.3%
Public Policy Polling	December 1–4, 2011	Barack Obama	46%	Mitt Romney	46%	Tied	865 RV	±3.3%
Public Policy Polling	October 27–31, 2011	Barack Obama	50%	Michele Bachmann	42%	8	615 RV	±4.0%
Public Policy Polling	October 27–31, 2011	Barack Obama	47%	Herman Cain	44%	3	615 RV	±4.0%
Public Policy Polling	October 27–31, 2011	Barack Obama	50%	Newt Gingrich	43%	7	615 RV	±4.0%
Public Policy Polling	October 27–31, 2011	Barack Obama	48%	Ron Paul	40%	8	615 RV	±4.0%
Public Policy Polling	October 27–31, 2011	Barack Obama	50%	Rick Perry	42%	8	615 RV	±4.0%
Public Policy Polling	October 27–31, 2011	Barack Obama	45%	Mitt Romney	46%	1	615 RV	±4.0%
Public Policy Polling	September 30 – October 3, 2011	Barack Obama	49%	Michele Bachmann	42%	7	760 RV	±3.6%
Public Policy Polling	September 30 – October 3, 2011	Barack Obama	45%	Chris Christie	46%	1	760 RV	±3.6%
Public Policy Polling	September 30 – October 3, 2011	Barack Obama	49%	Newt Gingrich	42%	7	760 RV	±3.6%
Public Policy Polling	September 30 – October 3, 2011	Barack Obama	46%	Ron Paul	43%	3	760 RV	±3.6%
Public Policy Polling	September 30 – October 3, 2011	Barack Obama	48%	Rick Perry	44%	4	760 RV	±3.6%
Public Policy Polling	September 30 – October 3, 2011	Barack Obama	46%	Mitt Romney	45%	1	760 RV	±3.6%
Public Policy Polling	September 1–4, 2011	Barack Obama	47%	Michele Bachmann	45%	2	520 RV	±4.3%
Public Policy Polling	September 1–4, 2011	Barack Obama	48%	Newt Gingrich	43%	5	520 RV	±4.3%
Public Policy Polling	September 1–4, 2011	Barack Obama	49%	Sarah Palin	42%	7	520 RV	±4.3%
Public Policy Polling	September 1–4, 2011	Barack Obama	46%	Rick Perry	46%	Tied	520 RV	±4.3%
Public Policy Polling	September 1–4, 2011	Barack Obama	45%	Mitt Romney	44%	1	520 RV	±4.3%
Public Policy Polling	August 4–7, 2011	Barack Obama	50%	Michele Bachmann	40%	10	780 RV	±3.5%
Public Policy Polling	August 4–7, 2011	Barack Obama	50%	Herman Cain	37%	13	780 RV	±3.5%
Public Policy Polling	August 4–7, 2011	Barack Obama	52%	Sarah Palin	39%	13	780 RV	±3.5%
Public Policy Polling	August 4–7, 2011	Barack Obama	48%	Rick Perry	40%	8	780 RV	±3.5%
Public Policy Polling	August 4–7, 2011	Barack Obama	46%	Mitt Romney	43%	3	780 RV	±3.5%
Public Policy Polling	July 7–10, 2011	Barack Obama	46%	Michele Bachmann	43%	3	651 RV	±3.8%
Public Policy Polling	July 7–10, 2011	Barack Obama	46%	Herman Cain	42%	4	651 RV	±3.8%
Public Policy Polling	July 7–10, 2011	Barack Obama	50%	Sarah Palin	42%	8	651 RV	±3.8%
Public Policy Polling	July 7–10, 2011	Barack Obama	46%	Tim Pawlenty	41%	5	651 RV	±3.8%
Public Policy Polling	July 7–10, 2011	Barack Obama	45%	Mitt Romney	45%	Tied	651 RV	±3.8%
Public Policy Polling	June 8–11, 2011	Barack Obama	48%	Herman Cain	37%	11	563 RV	±4.1%
Public Policy Polling	June 8–11, 2011	Barack Obama	50%	Newt Gingrich	40%	10	563 RV	±4.1%
Public Policy Polling	June 8–11, 2011	Barack Obama	52%	Sarah Palin	38%	14	563 RV	±4.1%
Public Policy Polling	June 8–11, 2011	Barack Obama	47%	Tim Pawlenty	40%	7	563 RV	±4.1%
Public Policy Polling	June 8–11, 2011	Barack Obama	45%	Mitt Romney	44%	1	563 RV	±4.1%
Public Policy Polling	May 12–15, 2011	Barack Obama	50%	Newt Gingrich	42%	8	835 RV	±3.4%
Public Policy Polling	May 12–15, 2011	Barack Obama	47%	Mike Huckabee	46%	1	835 RV	±3.4%
Public Policy Polling	May 12–15, 2011	Barack Obama	52%	Sarah Palin	40%	12	835 RV	±3.4%
Public Policy Polling	May 12–15, 2011	Barack Obama	46%	Mitt Romney	43%	3	835 RV	±3.4%
Public Policy Polling	May 12–15, 2011	Barack Obama	52%	Donald Trump	35%	17	835 RV	±3.4%
Public Policy Polling	April 14–17, 2011	Barack Obama	49%	Newt Gingrich	45%	4	507 RV	±4.4%
Public Policy Polling	April 14–17, 2011	Barack Obama	48%	Mike Huckabee	47%	1	507 RV	±4.4%
Public Policy Polling	April 14–17, 2011	Barack Obama	52%	Sarah Palin	40%	12	507 RV	±4.4%
Public Policy Polling	April 14–17, 2011	Barack Obama	47%	Mitt Romney	44%	3	507 RV	±4.4%
Public Policy Polling	April 14–17, 2011	Barack Obama	51%	Donald Trump	39%	12	507 RV	±4.4%
Public Policy Polling	March 17–20, 2011	Barack Obama	47%	Newt Gingrich	42%	5	584 RV	±4.1%
Public Policy Polling	March 17–20, 2011	Barack Obama	45%	Mike Huckabee	45%	Tied	584 RV	±4.1%
Public Policy Polling	March 17–20, 2011	Barack Obama	51%	Sarah Palin	40%	11	584 RV	±4.1%
Public Policy Polling	March 17–20, 2011	Barack Obama	44%	Mitt Romney	42%	2	584 RV	±4.1%
Public Policy Polling	February 16–21, 2011	Barack Obama	48%	Newt Gingrich	44%	4	650 RV	±3.8%
Public Policy Polling	February 16–21, 2011	Barack Obama	46%	Mike Huckabee	47%	1	650 RV	±3.8%
Public Policy Polling	February 16–21, 2011	Barack Obama	51%	Sarah Palin	41%	10	650 RV	±3.8%
Public Policy Polling	February 16–21, 2011	Barack Obama	47%	Mitt Romney	44%	3	650 RV	±3.8%
Public Policy Polling	January 20–23, 2011	Barack Obama	50%	Newt Gingrich	44%	6	575 RV	±4.1%
Public Policy Polling	January 20–23, 2011	Barack Obama	49%	Mike Huckabee	45%	4	575 RV	±4.1%
Public Policy Polling	January 20–23, 2011	Barack Obama	50%	Sarah Palin	41%	9	575 RV	±4.1%
Public Policy Polling	January 20–23, 2011	Barack Obama	47%	Mitt Romney	44%	3	575 RV	±4.1%
Public Policy Polling	December 17–19, 2010	Barack Obama	48%	Newt Gingrich	42%	6	520 RV	±4.3%
Public Policy Polling	December 17–19, 2010	Barack Obama	45%	Mike Huckabee	46%	1	520 RV	±4.3%
Public Policy Polling	December 17–19, 2010	Barack Obama	52%	Sarah Palin	38%	14	520 RV	±4.3%
Public Policy Polling	December 17–19, 2010	Barack Obama	46%	Mitt Romney	43%	3	520 RV	±4.3%
Public Policy Polling	November 19–21, 2010	Barack Obama	46%	Newt Gingrich	45%	1	517 RV	±4.3%
Public Policy Polling	November 19–21, 2010	Barack Obama	44%	Mike Huckabee	48%	4	517 RV	±4.3%
Public Policy Polling	November 19–21, 2010	Barack Obama	48%	Sarah Palin	43%	5	517 RV	±4.3%
Public Policy Polling	November 19–21, 2010	Barack Obama	44%	Mitt Romney	44%	Tied	517 RV	±4.3%
Public Policy Polling	July 10–12, 2009	Barack Obama	49%	Sarah Palin	42%	7	767 RV	±3.5%

== Ohio ==
18 electoral votes
(Republican in 2004) 51%–49%
(Democratic in 2008) 52%–47%

Poll source	Date administered	Democrat	%	Republican	%	Lead margin	Sample Size	Margin of error
Quinnipiac University	November 28 – December 5, 2011	Barack Obama	42%	Mitt Romney	43%	1	1,437 RV	±2.6%
Quinnipiac University	November 28 – December 5, 2011	Barack Obama	42%	Newt Gingrich	43%	1	1,437 RV	±2.6%
Quinnipiac University	October 31 – November 7, 2011	Barack Obama	48%	Herman Cain	38%	10	1,312 RV	±2.7%
Quinnipiac University	October 31 – November 7, 2011	Barack Obama	49%	Newt Gingrich	37%	12	1,312 RV	±2.7%
Quinnipiac University	October 31 – November 7, 2011	Barack Obama	48%	Rick Perry	36%	12	1,312 RV	±2.7%
Quinnipiac University	October 31 – November 7, 2011	Barack Obama	45%	Mitt Romney	42%	3	1,312 RV	±2.7%
Public Policy Polling	November 4–6, 2011	Barack Obama	51%	Michele Bachmann	37%	14	1,022 RV	±3.1%
Public Policy Polling	November 4–6, 2011	Barack Obama	50%	Herman Cain	39%	11	1,022 RV	±3.1%
Public Policy Polling	November 4–6, 2011	Barack Obama	51%	Newt Gingrich	38%	13	1,022 RV	±3.1%
Public Policy Polling	November 4–6, 2011	Barack Obama	50%	Ron Paul	36%	14	1,022 RV	±3.1%
Public Policy Polling	November 4–6, 2011	Barack Obama	53%	Rick Perry	36%	17	1,022 RV	±3.1%
Public Policy Polling	November 4–6, 2011	Barack Obama	50%	Mitt Romney	41%	9	1,022 RV	±3.1%
Quinnipiac University	October 17–23, 2011	Barack Obama	47%	Rick Perry	36%	11	1,668 RV	±2.4%
Quinnipiac University	October 17–23, 2011	Barack Obama	45%	Mitt Romney	41%	4	1,668 RV	±2.4%
Quinnipiac University	October 17–23, 2011	Barack Obama	47%	Herman Cain	39%	8	1,668 RV	±2.4%
Public Policy Polling	October 13–16, 2011	Barack Obama	49%	Michele Bachmann	40%	9	581 RV	±4.1%
Public Policy Polling	October 13–16, 2011	Barack Obama	48%	Herman Cain	45%	3	581 RV	±4.1%
Public Policy Polling	October 13–16, 2011	Barack Obama	51%	Newt Gingrich	40%	11	581 RV	±4.1%
Public Policy Polling	October 13–16, 2011	Barack Obama	50%	Rick Perry	41%	9	581 RV	±4.1%
Public Policy Polling	October 13–16, 2011	Barack Obama	46%	Mitt Romney	46%	Tied	581 RV	±4.1%
Quinnipiac University	September 22–25, 2011	Barack Obama	44%	Rick Perry	41%	3	1,301 RV	±2.7%
Quinnipiac University	September 22–25, 2011	Barack Obama	44%	Mitt Romney	42%	2	1,301 RV	±2.7%
Public Policy Polling	August 11–14, 2011	Barack Obama	48%	Michele Bachmann	41%	7	792 RV	±3.5%
Public Policy Polling	August 11–14, 2011	Barack Obama	47%	Herman Cain	39%	8	792 RV	±3.5%
Public Policy Polling	August 11–14, 2011	Barack Obama	51%	Sarah Palin	38%	13	792 RV	±3.5%
Public Policy Polling	August 11–14, 2011	Barack Obama	45%	Rick Perry	41%	4	792 RV	±3.5%
Public Policy Polling	August 11–14, 2011	Barack Obama	45%	Mitt Romney	43%	2	792 RV	±3.5%
Quinnipiac University	July 12–18, 2011	Barack Obama	49%	Michele Bachmann	36%	13	563 RV	±4.1%
Quinnipiac University	July 12–18, 2011	Barack Obama	51%	Sarah Palin	35%	16	563 RV	±4.1%
Quinnipiac University	July 12–18, 2011	Barack Obama	47%	Rick Perry	35%	12	563 RV	±4.1%
Quinnipiac University	July 12–18, 2011	Barack Obama	45%	Mitt Romney	41%	4	563 RV	±4.1%
Public Policy Polling	March 10–13, 2011	Barack Obama	50%	Newt Gingrich	38%	12	559 RV	±4.1%
Public Policy Polling	March 10–13, 2011	Barack Obama	48%	Mike Huckabee	41%	7	559 RV	±4.1%
Public Policy Polling	March 10–13, 2011	Barack Obama	52%	Sarah Palin	36%	16	559 RV	±4.1%
Public Policy Polling	March 10–13, 2011	Barack Obama	46%	Mitt Romney	40%	6	559 RV	±4.1%
Public Policy Polling	December 10–12, 2010	Barack Obama	47%	Newt Gingrich	41%	6	510 RV	±4.3%
Public Policy Polling	December 10–12, 2010	Barack Obama	45%	Mike Huckabee	44%	1	510 RV	±4.3%
Public Policy Polling	December 10–12, 2010	Barack Obama	49%	Sarah Palin	42%	7	510 RV	±4.3%
Public Policy Polling	December 10–12, 2010	Barack Obama	44%	Mitt Romney	42%	2	510 RV	±4.3%

== Oregon ==
7 electoral votes
(Democratic in 2004) 51%–47%
(Democratic in 2008) 57%–40%

Poll source	Date administered	Democrat	%	Republican	%	Lead margin	Sample Size	Margin of error
Daily Kos/Service Employees' International Union/Service Employees' International Union/Public Policy Polling (D)	December 13–14, 2011	Barack Obama	55%	Newt Gingrich	37%	18	979 RV	±3.1%
Daily Kos/Service Employees' International Union/Service Employees' International Union/Public Policy Polling (D)	December 13–14, 2011	Barack Obama	53%	Mitt Romney	40%	13	979 RV	±3.1%
KATU-TV Portland/SurveyUSA	November 18–21, 2011	Barack Obama	51%	Newt Gingrich	37%	14	528 RV	±4.4%
KATU-TV Portland/SurveyUSA	November 18–21, 2011	Barack Obama	48%	Mitt Romney	40%	8	528 RV	±4.4%
Public Policy Polling	June 19–21, 2011	Barack Obama	53%	Michele Bachmann	35%	18	701 RV	±3.7%
Public Policy Polling	June 19–21, 2011	Barack Obama	53%	Herman Cain	32%	21	701 RV	±3.7%
Public Policy Polling	June 19–21, 2011	Barack Obama	57%	Sarah Palin	35%	22	701 RV	±3.7%
Public Policy Polling	June 19–21, 2011	Barack Obama	52%	Tim Pawlenty	34%	18	701 RV	±3.7%
Public Policy Polling	June 19–21, 2011	Barack Obama	50%	Mitt Romney	38%	12	701 RV	±3.7%

== Pennsylvania ==
20 electoral votes
(Democratic in 2004) 51%–48%
(Democratic in 2008) 54%–44%

Poll source	Date administered	Democrat	%	Republican	%	Lead margin	Sample Size	Margin of error
Morning Call/Muhlenberg College	November 28 – December 7, 2011	Barack Obama	45%	Mitt Romney	41%	4	422 RV	±5%
Morning Call/Muhlenberg College	November 28 – December 7, 2011	Barack Obama	52%	Newt Gingrich	35%	17	422 RV	±5%
Morning Call/Muhlenberg College	November 28 – December 7, 2011	Barack Obama	48%	Rick Perry	30%	18	422 RV	±5%
Morning Call/Muhlenberg College	November 28 – December 7, 2011	Barack Obama	55%	Herman Cain	28%	27	422 RV	±5%
Quinnipiac University	November 28 – December 5, 2011	Barack Obama	46%	Mitt Romney	43%	3	1,453 RV	±2.6%
Quinnipiac University	November 28 – December 5, 2011	Barack Obama	48%	Newt Gingrich	40%	8	1,453 RV	±2.6%
Public Policy Polling	November 17–20, 2011	Barack Obama	53%	Herman Cain	35%	18	500 RV	±4.4%
Public Policy Polling	November 17–20, 2011	Barack Obama	49%	Newt Gingrich	43%	6	500 RV	±4.4%
Public Policy Polling	November 17–20, 2011	Barack Obama	46%	Ron Paul	42%	4	500 RV	±4.4%
Public Policy Polling	November 17–20, 2011	Barack Obama	51%	Rick Perry	38%	13	500 RV	±4.4%
Public Policy Polling	November 17–20, 2011	Barack Obama	45%	Mitt Romney	45%	Tied	500 RV	±4.4%
Public Policy Polling	November 17–20, 2011	Barack Obama	47%	Rick Santorum	42%	5	500 RV	±4.4%
Survey USA	November 10, 2011	Barack Obama	47%	Newt Gingrich	40%	7	800 RV	±3.5%
Survey USA	November 10, 2011	Barack Obama	44%	Mitt Romney	44%	Tied	800 RV	±3.5%
Quinnipiac University	October 31 – November 7, 2011	Barack Obama	48%	Herman Cain	38%	10	1,436 RV	±2.6%
Quinnipiac University	October 31 – November 7, 2011	Barack Obama	48%	Newt Gingrich	38%	10	1,436 RV	±2.6%
Quinnipiac University	October 31 – November 7, 2011	Barack Obama	47%	Rick Perry	38%	9	1,436 RV	±2.6%
Quinnipiac University	October 31 – November 7, 2011	Barack Obama	44%	Mitt Romney	43%	1	1,436 RV	±2.6%
Franklin & Marshall College	October 24–30, 2011	Barack Obama	38%	Herman Cain	24%	14	525 RV	±4.3%
Franklin & Marshall College	October 24–30, 2011	Barack Obama	40%	Rick Perry	20%	20	525 RV	±4.3%
Franklin & Marshall College	October 24–30, 2011	Barack Obama	35%	Mitt Romney	26%	9	525 RV	±4.3%
Franklin & Marshall College	October 24–30, 2011	Barack Obama	38%	Rick Santorum	25%	13	525 RV	±4.3%
Quinnipiac University	September 21–26, 2011	Barack Obama	46%	Rick Perry	40%	6	1,370 RV	±2.7%
Quinnipiac University	September 21–26, 2011	Barack Obama	45%	Mitt Romney	43%	2	1,370 RV	±2.7%
Quinnipiac University	September 21–26, 2011	Barack Obama	45%	Rick Santorum	42%	3	1,370 RV	±2.7%
Franklin & Marshall College	August 22–29, 2011	Barack Obama	42%	Michele Bachmann	23%	19	525 RV	±4.3%
Franklin & Marshall College	August 22–29, 2011	Barack Obama	38%	Rick Perry	27%	11	525 RV	±4.3%
Franklin & Marshall College	August 22–29, 2011	Barack Obama	36%	Mitt Romney	30%	6	525 RV	±4.3%
Quinnipiac University	July 25–31, 2011	Barack Obama	47%	Michele Bachmann	39%	8	1,358 RV	±2.7%
Quinnipiac University	July 25–31, 2011	Barack Obama	45%	Rick Perry	39%	6	1,358 RV	±2.7%
Quinnipiac University	July 25–31, 2011	Barack Obama	42%	Mitt Romney	44%	2	1,358 RV	±2.7%
Quinnipiac University	July 25–31, 2011	Barack Obama	45%	Rick Santorum	43%	2	1,358 RV	±2.7%
Public Policy Polling	June 30 – July 5, 2011	Barack Obama	50%	Michele Bachmann	43%	7	545 RV	±4.2%
Public Policy Polling	June 30 – July 5, 2011	Barack Obama	49%	Herman Cain	37%	12	545 RV	±4.2%
Public Policy Polling	June 30 – July 5, 2011	Barack Obama	53%	Sarah Palin	39%	14	545 RV	±4.2%
Public Policy Polling	June 30 – July 5, 2011	Barack Obama	47%	Tim Pawlenty	39%	8	545 RV	±4.2%
Public Policy Polling	June 30 – July 5, 2011	Barack Obama	44%	Mitt Romney	44%	Tied	545 RV	±4.2%
Public Policy Polling	June 30 – July 5, 2011	Barack Obama	50%	Rick Santorum	40%	10	545 RV	±4.2%
Quinnipiac University	June 7–12, 2011	Barack Obama	47%	Mitt Romney	40%	7	1,277 RV	±2.7%
Quinnipiac University	June 7–12, 2011	Barack Obama	49%	Rick Santorum	38%	11	1,277 RV	±2.7%
Public Policy Polling	April 7–10, 2011	Barack Obama	47%	Newt Gingrich	39%	8	593 RV	±4.0%
Public Policy Polling	April 7–10, 2011	Barack Obama	45%	Mike Huckabee	44%	1	593 RV	±4.0%
Public Policy Polling	April 7–10, 2011	Barack Obama	50%	Sarah Palin	39%	11	593 RV	±4.0%
Public Policy Polling	April 7–10, 2011	Barack Obama	42%	Mitt Romney	43%	1	593 RV	±4.0%
Public Policy Polling	April 7–10, 2011	Barack Obama	45%	Rick Santorum	43%	2	593 RV	±4.0%
Public Policy Polling	January 3–5, 2011	Barack Obama	50%	Newt Gingrich	40%	10	547 RV	±4.2%
Public Policy Polling	January 3–5, 2011	Barack Obama	47%	Mike Huckabee	44%	3	547 RV	±4.2%
Public Policy Polling	January 3–5, 2011	Barack Obama	51%	Sarah Palin	36%	15	547 RV	±4.2%
Public Policy Polling	January 3–5, 2011	Barack Obama	46%	Mitt Romney	42%	4	547 RV	±4.2%
Public Policy Polling	January 3–5, 2011	Barack Obama	48%	Rick Santorum	40%	8	547 RV	±4.2%

== Rhode Island ==
4 electoral votes
(Democratic in 2004) 59%–39%
(Democratic in 2008) 63%–35%

Poll source	Date administered	Democrat	%	Republican	%	Lead margin	Sample Size	Margin of error
Public Policy Polling	February 16–22, 2011	Barack Obama	60%	Newt Gingrich	27%	33	544 RV	±4.2%
Public Policy Polling	February 16–22, 2011	Barack Obama	56%	Mike Huckabee	31%	25	544 RV	±4.2%
Public Policy Polling	February 16–22, 2011	Barack Obama	65%	Sarah Palin	24%	41	544 RV	±4.2%
Public Policy Polling	February 16–22, 2011	Barack Obama	54%	Mitt Romney	37%	17	544 RV	±4.2%

== South Carolina ==
9 electoral votes
(Republican in 2004) 58%–41%
(Republican in 2008) 54%–45%

Poll source	Date administered	Democrat	%	Republican	%	Lead margin	Sample Size	Margin of error
NBC News/Marist College	December 4–7, 2011	Barack Obama	45%	Mitt Romney	42%	3	2,107 RV	±2.1%
NBC News/Marist College	December 4–7, 2011	Barack Obama	46%	Newt Gingrich	42%	4	2,107 RV	±2.1%
NBC News/Marist College	December 4–7, 2011	Barack Obama	47%	Ron Paul	37%	10	2,107 RV	±2.1%
NBC News/Marist College	October 10–12, 2011	Barack Obama	42%	Herman Cain	44%	2	2,131 RV	±2.1%
NBC News/Marist College	October 10–12, 2011	Barack Obama	42%	Rick Perry	43%	1	2,131 RV	±2.1%
NBC News/Marist College	October 10–12, 2011	Barack Obama	40%	Mitt Romney	46%	6	2,131 RV	±2.1%
Public Policy Polling	August 25–28, 2011	Barack Obama	44%	Michele Bachmann	44%	Tied	587 RV	±4.0%
Public Policy Polling	August 25–28, 2011	Barack Obama	44%	Newt Gingrich	45%	1	587 RV	±4.0%
Public Policy Polling	August 25–28, 2011	Barack Obama	45%	Sarah Palin	45%	Tied	587 RV	±4.0%
Public Policy Polling	August 25–28, 2011	Barack Obama	41%	Rick Perry	49%	8	587 RV	±4.0%
Public Policy Polling	August 25–28, 2011	Barack Obama	38%	Mitt Romney	53%	15	587 RV	±4.0%
Public Policy Polling	June 2–5, 2011	Barack Obama	43%	Herman Cain	40%	3	741 RV	±3.6%
Public Policy Polling	June 2–5, 2011	Barack Obama	44%	Jim DeMint	47%	3	741 RV	±3.6%
Public Policy Polling	June 2–5, 2011	Barack Obama	46%	Newt Gingrich	44%	2	741 RV	±3.6%
Public Policy Polling	June 2–5, 2011	Barack Obama	48%	Sarah Palin	43%	5	741 RV	±3.6%
Public Policy Polling	June 2–5, 2011	Barack Obama	42%	Tim Pawlenty	42%	Tied	741 RV	±3.6%
Public Policy Polling	June 2–5, 2011	Barack Obama	41%	Mitt Romney	50%	9	741 RV	±3.6%
Public Policy Polling	January 28–30, 2011	Barack Obama	44%	Newt Gingrich	43%	1	1,167 RV	±2.9%
Public Policy Polling	January 28–30, 2011	Barack Obama	43%	Mike Huckabee	49%	6	1,167 RV	±2.9%
Public Policy Polling	January 28–30, 2011	Barack Obama	47%	Sarah Palin	41%	6	1,167 RV	±2.9%
Public Policy Polling	January 28–30, 2011	Barack Obama	42%	Mitt Romney	49%	7	1,167 RV	±2.9%
Public Policy Polling	January 28–30, 2011	Barack Obama	45%	Jim DeMint	47%	2	1,167 RV	±2.9%

== South Dakota ==
3 electoral votes
(Republican in 2004) 60%–38%
(Republican in 2008) 53%–45%

Poll source	Date administered	Democrat	%	Republican	%	Lead margin	Sample Size	Margin of error
Public Policy Polling	January 28–30, 2011	Barack Obama	44%	Newt Gingrich	42%	2	1,045 RV	±3.0%
Public Policy Polling	January 28–30, 2011	Barack Obama	41%	Mike Huckabee	47%	6	1,045 RV	±3.0%
Public Policy Polling	January 28–30, 2011	Barack Obama	48%	Sarah Palin	40%	8	1,045 RV	±3.0%
Public Policy Polling	January 28–30, 2011	Barack Obama	40%	Mitt Romney	46%	6	1,045 RV	±3.0%
Public Policy Polling	January 28–30, 2011	Barack Obama	37%	John Thune	57%	20	1,045 RV	±3.0%

== Tennessee ==
11 electoral votes
(Republican in 2004) 57%–43%
(Republican in 2008) 57%–42%

Poll source	Date administered	Democrat	%	Republican	%	Lead margin	Sample Size	Margin of error
Vanderbilt University	October 28 – November 5, 2011	Barack Obama	39%	Rick Perry	40%	1	1,423 RV	±2.6%
Vanderbilt University	October 28 – November 5, 2011	Barack Obama	37%	Herman Cain	41%	4	1,423 RV	±2.6%
Vanderbilt University	October 28 – November 5, 2011	Barack Obama	38%	Mitt Romney	42%	4	1,423 RV	±2.6%
Middle Tennessee State University	October 3–14, 2011	Barack Obama	29%	Mitt Romney	44%	14	635 A	±4%
Vanderbilt University	June 3–8, 2011	Barack Obama	38%	Michele Bachmann	27%	11	700 RV	±3.7%
Vanderbilt University	June 3–8, 2011	Barack Obama	38%	Newt Gingrich	26%	12	700 RV	±3.7%
Vanderbilt University	June 3–8, 2011	Barack Obama	43%	Sarah Palin	29%	14	700 RV	±3.7%
Vanderbilt University	June 3–8, 2011	Barack Obama	37%	Tim Pawlenty	28%	9	700 RV	±3.7%
Vanderbilt University	June 3–8, 2011	Barack Obama	37%	Mitt Romney	35%	2	700 RV	±3.7%
Public Policy Polling	February 9–13, 2011	Barack Obama	43%	Newt Gingrich	46%	3	500 RV	±4.4%
Public Policy Polling	February 9–13, 2011	Barack Obama	41%	Mike Huckabee	53%	12	500 RV	±4.4%
Public Policy Polling	February 9–13, 2011	Barack Obama	45%	Sarah Palin	45%	Tied	500 RV	±4.4%
Public Policy Polling	February 9–13, 2011	Barack Obama	41%	Mitt Romney	48%	7	500 RV	±4.4%
FRONTPAGE Vanderbilt University	January 14–16, 2011	Barack Obama	42%	Sarah Palin	37%	5	710 RV	±3.3%

Three Way race

Poll source	Date administered	Democrat	%	Republican	%	Third party/independent	%	Lead margin
Vanderbilt University	October 28 – November 5, 2011	Barack Obama	34%	Rick Perry	27%	"a qualified Independent candidate"	23%	7
Vanderbilt University	October 28 – November 5, 2011	Barack Obama	38%	Herman Cain	30%	"a qualified Independent candidate"	18%	8
Vanderbilt University	October 28 – November 5, 2011	Barack Obama	36%	Mitt Romney	25%	"a qualified Independent candidate"	23%	11
Vanderbilt University	October 28 – November 5, 2011	Barack Obama	33%	Mitt Romney	28%	Michael Bloomberg	14%	5
Vanderbilt University	October 28 – November 5, 2011	Barack Obama	34%	Mitt Romney	28%	Warren Buffett	18%	6
Vanderbilt University	October 28 – November 5, 2011	Barack Obama	38%	Mitt Romney	35%	Alec Baldwin	8%	3

== Texas ==
38 electoral votes
(Republican in 2004) 61%–38%
(Republican in 2008) 55%–44%

Poll source	Date administered	Democrat	%	Republican	%	Lead margin	Sample Size	Margin of error
University of Texas/Texas Tribune/YouGov	October 19–26, 2011	Barack Obama	33%	Ron Paul	38%	5	800 A	±3.46%
University of Texas/Texas Tribune/YouGov	October 19–26, 2011	Barack Obama	35%	Herman Cain	40%	5	800 A	±3.46%
University of Texas/Texas Tribune/YouGov	October 19–26, 2011	Barack Obama	34%	Mitt Romney	36%	2	800 A	±3.46%
University of Texas/Texas Tribune/YouGov	October 19–26, 2011	Barack Obama	37%	Rick Perry	45%	8	800 A	±3.46%
Public Policy Polling	June 25–27, 2011	Barack Obama	44%	Michele Bachmann	47%	3	795 RV	±3.5%
Public Policy Polling	June 25–27, 2011	Barack Obama	43%	Herman Cain	43%	Tied	795 RV	±3.5%
Public Policy Polling	June 25–27, 2011	Barack Obama	46%	Sarah Palin	44%	2	795 RV	±3.5%
Public Policy Polling	June 25–27, 2011	Barack Obama	43%	Tim Pawlenty	44%	1	795 RV	±3.5%
Public Policy Polling	June 25–27, 2011	Barack Obama	42%	Mitt Romney	50%	8	795 RV	±3.5%
Public Policy Polling	June 25–27, 2011	Barack Obama	40%	Ron Paul	45%	5	795 RV	±3.5%
Public Policy Polling	June 25–27, 2011	Barack Obama	47%	Rick Perry	45%	2	795 RV	±3.5%
Public Policy Polling	January 14–16, 2011	Barack Obama	43%	Newt Gingrich	48%	5	892 RV	±3.3%
Public Policy Polling	January 14–16, 2011	Barack Obama	39%	Mike Huckabee	55%	16	892 RV	±3.3%
Public Policy Polling	January 14–16, 2011	Barack Obama	46%	Sarah Palin	47%	1	892 RV	±3.3%
Public Policy Polling	January 14–16, 2011	Barack Obama	42%	Mitt Romney	49%	7	892 RV	±3.3%
Public Policy Polling	January 14–16, 2011	Barack Obama	45%	Rick Perry	45%	Tied	892 RV	±3.3%
University of Texas at Austin	June 11–22, 2009	Barack Obama	34%	Mitt Romney	39%	5	924 A	±3.22%

== Utah ==
6 electoral votes
(Republican in 2004) 72%–26%
(Republican in 2008) 62%–34%

Poll source	Date administered	Democrat	%	Republican	%	Lead margin	Sample size	Margin of error
Public Policy Polling	July 8–10, 2011	Barack Obama	35%	Michele Bachmann	49%	14	732 RV	±3.6%
Public Policy Polling	July 8–10, 2011	Barack Obama	36%	Herman Cain	43%	7	732 RV	±3.6%
Public Policy Polling	July 8–10, 2011	Barack Obama	23%	Jon Huntsman	63%	40	732 RV	±3.6%
Public Policy Polling	July 8–10, 2011	Barack Obama	41%	Sarah Palin	43%	2	732 RV	±3.6%
Public Policy Polling	July 8–10, 2011	Barack Obama	34%	Tim Pawlenty	45%	11	732 RV	±3.6%
Public Policy Polling	July 8–10, 2011	Barack Obama	31%	Mitt Romney	63%	32	732 RV	±3.6%
Salt Lake Tribune/Mason-Dixon Polling & Research	April 26–28, 2010	Barack Obama	22%	Mitt Romney	73%	51	400 RV	±5.0%
Salt Lake Tribune/Mason-Dixon Polling & Research	April 26–28, 2010	Barack Obama	32%	Sarah Palin	53%	22	400 RV	±5.0%
Salt Lake Tribune/Mason-Dixon Polling & Research	April 26–28, 2010	Barack Obama	31%	Ron Paul	48%	17	400 RV	±5.0%
KSL-TV/Dan Jones & Associates	April 29, 2009	Barack Obama	27%	Mitt Romney	67%	40	254 A	±6.2%
KSL-TV/Dan Jones & Associates	April 29, 2009	Barack Obama	25%	Jon Huntsman	58%	33	254 A	±6.2%

== Vermont ==
3 electoral votes
(Democratic in 2004) 59%–39%
(Democratic in 2008) 67%–30%

Poll source	Date administered	Democrat	%	Republican	%	Lead margin	Sample size	Margin of error
Public Policy Polling	July 28–31, 2011	Barack Obama	58%	Michele Bachmann	30%	28	1,233 RV	±2.8%
Public Policy Polling	July 28–31, 2011	Barack Obama	58%	Herman Cain	26%	32	1,233 RV	±2.8%
Public Policy Polling	July 28–31, 2011	Barack Obama	53%	Mike Huckabee	36%	17	1,233 RV	±2.8%
Public Policy Polling	July 28–31, 2011	Barack Obama	62%	Sarah Palin	28%	34	1,233 RV	±2.8%
Public Policy Polling	July 28–31, 2011	Barack Obama	57%	Rick Perry	28%	29	1,233 RV	±2.8%
Public Policy Polling	July 28–31, 2011	Barack Obama	54%	Mitt Romney	34%	20	1,233 RV	±2.8%

== Virginia ==
13 electoral votes
(Republican in 2004) 54%–46%
(Democratic in 2008) 53%–46%

Poll source	Date administered	Democrat	%	Republican	%	Lead margin	Sample size	Margin of error
Quinnipiac University	December 13–19, 2011	Barack Obama	46%	Newt Gingrich	41%	5	1,135 RV	±2.9%
Quinnipiac University	December 13–19, 2011	Barack Obama	42%	Mitt Romney	44%	2	1,135 RV	±2.9%
Public Policy Polling	December 11–13, 2011	Barack Obama	52%	Michele Bachmann	39%	13	600 RV	±4%
Public Policy Polling	December 11–13, 2011	Barack Obama	50%	Newt Gingrich	43%	7	600 RV	±4%
Public Policy Polling	December 11–13, 2011	Barack Obama	48%	Ron Paul	40%	8	600 RV	±4%
Public Policy Polling	December 11–13, 2011	Barack Obama	51%	Rick Perry	41%	10	600 RV	±4%
Public Policy Polling	December 11–13, 2011	Barack Obama	48%	Mitt Romney	42%	6	600 RV	±4%
Quinnipiac University	October 3–9, 2011	Barack Obama	45%	Herman Cain	43%	2	1,459 RV	±2.6%
Quinnipiac University	October 3–9, 2011	Barack Obama	47%	Rick Perry	42%	5	1,459 RV	±2.6%
Quinnipiac University	October 3–9, 2011	Barack Obama	44%	Mitt Romney	45%	1	1,459 RV	±2.6%
Richmond Times-Dispatch/Muhlenberg College/Christopher Newport University	October 3–8, 2011	Barack Obama	43%	Rick Perry	43%	Tied	1,027 RV	±3.1%
Richmond Times-Dispatch/Muhlenberg College/Christopher Newport University	October 3–8, 2011	Barack Obama	42%	Mitt Romney	46%	4	1,027 RV	±3.1%
Roanoke College	September 6–17, 2011	Barack Obama	46%	Michele Bachmann	35%	9	601 A	±4%
Roanoke College	September 6–17, 2011	Barack Obama	50%	Sarah Palin	31%	19	601 A	±4%
Roanoke College	September 6–17, 2011	Barack Obama	43%	Ron Paul	33%	10	601 A	±4%
Roanoke College	September 6–17, 2011	Barack Obama	40%	Rick Perry	42%	2	601 A	±4%
Roanoke College	September 6–17, 2011	Barack Obama	37%	Mitt Romney	45%	8	601 A	±4%
Quinnipiac University	September 7–12, 2011	Barack Obama	48%	Michele Bachmann	37%	11	1,368 RV	±2.7%
Quinnipiac University	September 7–12, 2011	Barack Obama	50%	Sarah Palin	35%	15	1,368 RV	±2.7%
Quinnipiac University	September 7–12, 2011	Barack Obama	44%	Rick Perry	42%	2	1,368 RV	±2.7%
Quinnipiac University	September 7–12, 2011	Barack Obama	42%	Mitt Romney	44%	2	1,368 RV	±2.7%
Public Policy Polling	July 21–24, 2011	Barack Obama	49%	Michele Bachmann	40%	9	500 RV	±4.4%
Public Policy Polling	July 21–24, 2011	Barack Obama	49%	Herman Cain	38%	11	500 RV	±4.4%
Public Policy Polling	July 21–24, 2011	Barack Obama	51%	Sarah Palin	37%	14	500 RV	±4.4%
Public Policy Polling	July 21–24, 2011	Barack Obama	48%	Rick Perry	39%	9	500 RV	±4.4%
Public Policy Polling	July 21–24, 2011	Barack Obama	47%	Mitt Romney	43%	4	500 RV	±4.4%
Public Policy Polling	May 5–8, 2011	Barack Obama	54%	Newt Gingrich	37%	17	547 RV	±4.2%
Public Policy Polling	May 5–8, 2011	Barack Obama	52%	Mike Huckabee	43%	9	547 RV	±4.2%
Public Policy Polling	May 5–8, 2011	Barack Obama	55%	Sarah Palin	40%	15	547 RV	±4.2%
Public Policy Polling	May 5–8, 2011	Barack Obama	51%	Mitt Romney	40%	11	547 RV	±4.2%
Public Policy Polling	May 5–8, 2011	Barack Obama	54%	Donald Trump	32%	22	547 RV	±4.2%
Public Policy Polling	May 5–8, 2011	Barack Obama	51%	Bob McDonnell	43%	8	547 RV	±4.2%
The Washington Post	May 2–4, 2011	Barack Obama	51%	Mitt Romney	44%	7	503 RV	Not reported
The Washington Post	May 2–4, 2011	Barack Obama	53%	Mike Huckabee	34%	9	503 RV	Not reported
The Washington Post	May 2–4, 2011	Barack Obama	55%	Tim Pawlenty	35%	20	503 RV	Not reported
The Washington Post	May 2–4, 2011	Barack Obama	61%	Donald Trump	30%	31	503 RV	Not reported
The Washington Post	May 2–4, 2011	Barack Obama	61%	Sarah Palin	30%	31	503 RV	Not reported
The Washington Post	April 28 – May 1, 2011	Barack Obama	48%	Mitt Romney	46%	2	677 RV	Not reported
The Washington Post	April 28 – May 1, 2011	Barack Obama	50%	Mike Huckabee	46%	4	677 RV	Not reported
The Washington Post	April 28 – May 1, 2011	Barack Obama	51%	Tim Pawlenty	38%	13	677 RV	Not reported
The Washington Post	April 28 – May 1, 2011	Barack Obama	54%	Donald Trump	35%	19	677 RV	Not reported
The Washington Post	April 28 – May 1, 2011	Barack Obama	55%	Sarah Palin	36%	19	677 RV	Not reported
Public Policy Polling	February 24–27, 2011	Barack Obama	51%	Newt Gingrich	39%	12	524 RV	±3.5%
Public Policy Polling	February 24–27, 2011	Barack Obama	51%	Mike Huckabee	43%	8	524 RV	±3.5%
Public Policy Polling	February 24–27, 2011	Barack Obama	54%	Sarah Palin	35%	19	524 RV	±3.5%
Public Policy Polling	February 24–27, 2011	Barack Obama	48%	Mitt Romney	42%	6	524 RV	±3.5%
Public Policy Polling	November 10–13, 2010	Barack Obama	48%	Mitt Romney	43%	5	551 RV	±4.2%
Public Policy Polling	November 10–13, 2010	Barack Obama	51%	Sarah Palin	40%	11	551 RV	±4.2%
Public Policy Polling	November 10–13, 2010	Barack Obama	49%	Mike Huckabee	44%	5	551 RV	±4.2%
Public Policy Polling	November 10–13, 2010	Barack Obama	52%	Newt Gingrich	41%	11	551 RV	±4.2%

== Washington ==
12 electoral votes
(Democratic in 2004) 53%–46%
(Democratic in 2008) 58%–40%

Poll source	Date administered	Democrat	%	Republican	%	Lead margin	Sample size	Margin of error
KING-TV Seattle/SurveyUSA	November 21–23, 2011	Barack Obama	56%	Newt Gingrich	37%	19	549 RV	±4.3%
KING-TV Seattle/SurveyUSA	November 21–23, 2011	Barack Obama	49%	Mitt Romney	41%	8	549 RV	±4.3%
University of Washington	October 10–30, 2011	Barack Obama	54%	Rick Perry	41%	13	938 RV	±3.2%
University of Washington	October 10–30, 2011	Barack Obama	50%	Mitt Romney	41%	9	938 RV	±3.2%
Strategies 360	September 11–14, 2011	Barack Obama	51%	Rick Perry	37%	14	400 LV	±4.9%
Strategies 360	September 11–14, 2011	Barack Obama	49%	Mitt Romney	40%	9	400 LV	±4.9%
Public Policy Polling	May 12–15, 2011	Barack Obama	54%	Newt Gingrich	36%	18	1098 RV	±3.0%
Public Policy Polling	May 12–15, 2011	Barack Obama	53%	Mike Huckabee	39%	14	1098 RV	±3.0%
Public Policy Polling	May 12–15, 2011	Barack Obama	57%	Sarah Palin	34%	23	1098 RV	±3.0%
Public Policy Polling	May 12–15, 2011	Barack Obama	51%	Mitt Romney	40%	11	1098 RV	±3.0%
Public Policy Polling	May 12–15, 2011	Barack Obama	58%	Donald Trump	31%	27	1098 RV	±3.0%

== West Virginia ==
5 electoral votes
(Republican in 2004) 56%–43%
(Republican in 2008) 56%–43%

Poll source	Date administered	Democrat	%	Republican	%	Lead margin	Sample size	Margin of error
Public Policy Polling	September 30– October 2, 2011	Barack Obama	37%	Michele Bachmann	52%	15	932 RV	±3.2%
Public Policy Polling	September 30– October 2, 2011	Barack Obama	36%	Newt Gingrich	51%	15	932 RV	±3.2%
Public Policy Polling	September 30– October 2, 2011	Barack Obama	34%	Ron Paul	48%	14	932 RV	±3.2%
Public Policy Polling	September 30– October 2, 2011	Barack Obama	36%	Rick Perry	52%	16	932 RV	±3.2%
Public Policy Polling	September 30– October 2, 2011	Barack Obama	33%	Mitt Romney	54%	21	932 RV	±3.2%
Public Policy Polling	September 1–4, 2011	Barack Obama	39%	Michele Bachmann	48%	9	708 RV	±3.7%
Public Policy Polling	September 1–4, 2011	Barack Obama	40%	Newt Gingrich	45%	5	708 RV	±3.7%
Public Policy Polling	September 1–4, 2011	Barack Obama	42%	Sarah Palin	45%	3	708 RV	±3.7%
Public Policy Polling	September 1–4, 2011	Barack Obama	38%	Rick Perry	49%	11	708 RV	±3.7%
Public Policy Polling	September 1–4, 2011	Barack Obama	37%	Mitt Romney	49%	12	708 RV	±3.7%
Public Policy Polling	January 20–23, 2011	Barack Obama	39%	Newt Gingrich	49%	10	1105 RV	±2.9%
Public Policy Polling	January 20–23, 2011	Barack Obama	36%	Mike Huckabee	54%	18	1105 RV	±2.9%
Public Policy Polling	January 20–23, 2011	Barack Obama	42%	Sarah Palin	46%	4	1105 RV	±2.9%
Public Policy Polling	January 20–23, 2011	Barack Obama	37%	Mitt Romney	50%	13	1105 RV	±2.9%

== Wisconsin ==
10 electoral votes
(Democratic in 2004) 50%–49%
(Democratic in 2008) 56%–42%

Poll source	Date administered	Democrat	%	Republican	%	Lead margin	Sample size	Margin of error
WRPI	October 18–26, 2011	Barack Obama	50%	Herman Cain	31%	19	605 A	±4%
WRPI	October 18–26, 2011	Barack Obama	48%	Rick Perry	30%	18	605 A	±4%
WRPI	October 18–26, 2011	Barack Obama	46%	Mitt Romney	35%	11	605 A	±4%
Public Policy Polling	October 20–23, 2011	Barack Obama	51%	Michele Bachmann	40%	11	1,170 RV	±2.9%
Public Policy Polling	October 20–23, 2011	Barack Obama	49%	Herman Cain	42%	7	1,170 RV	±2.9%
Public Policy Polling	October 20–23, 2011	Barack Obama	52%	Newt Gingrich	38%	14	1,170 RV	±2.9%
Public Policy Polling	October 20–23, 2011	Barack Obama	50%	Rick Perry	39%	11	1,170 RV	±2.9%
Public Policy Polling	October 20–23, 2011	Barack Obama	46%	Mitt Romney	43%	3	1,170 RV	±2.9%
Public Policy Polling	August 12–14, 2011	Barack Obama	51%	Michele Bachmann	39%	12	830 RV	±3.4%
Public Policy Polling	August 12–14, 2011	Barack Obama	50%	Herman Cain	36%	14	830 RV	±3.4%
Public Policy Polling	August 12–14, 2011	Barack Obama	52%	Sarah Palin	40%	12	830 RV	±3.4%
Public Policy Polling	August 12–14, 2011	Barack Obama	50%	Rick Perry	40%	10	830 RV	±3.4%
Public Policy Polling	August 12–14, 2011	Barack Obama	47%	Mitt Romney	42%	5	830 RV	±3.4%
Public Policy Polling	May 19–22, 2011	Barack Obama	53%	Newt Gingrich	35%	18	1,636 RV	±2.4%
Public Policy Polling	May 19–22, 2011	Barack Obama	55%	Sarah Palin	36%	19	1,636 RV	±2.4%
Public Policy Polling	May 19–22, 2011	Barack Obama	51%	Mitt Romney	39%	12	1,636 RV	±2.4%
Public Policy Polling	May 19–22, 2011	Barack Obama	50%	Paul Ryan	43%	7	1,636 RV	±2.4%
Public Policy Polling	February 24–27, 2011	Barack Obama	51%	Newt Gingrich	39%	12	768 RV	±3.5%
Public Policy Polling	February 24–27, 2011	Barack Obama	48%	Mike Huckabee	41%	7	768 RV	±3.5%
Public Policy Polling	February 24–27, 2011	Barack Obama	54%	Sarah Palin	35%	19	768 RV	±3.5%
Public Policy Polling	February 24–27, 2011	Barack Obama	48%	Mitt Romney	38%	10	768 RV	±3.5%
Public Policy Polling	February 24–27, 2011	Barack Obama	49%	Paul Ryan	40%	9	768 RV	±3.5%
Public Policy Polling	December 10–12, 2010	Barack Obama	50%	Newt Gingrich	41%	9	702 RV	±3.7%
Public Policy Polling	December 10–12, 2010	Barack Obama	47%	Mike Huckabee	41%	6	702 RV	±3.7%
Public Policy Polling	December 10–12, 2010	Barack Obama	52%	Sarah Palin	38%	14	702 RV	±3.7%
Public Policy Polling	December 10–12, 2010	Barack Obama	46%	Mitt Romney	42%	4	702 RV	±3.7%
Rasmussen Reports/Pulse Opinion Research	October 26, 2010	Barack Obama	47%	Herman Cain	42%	5	500 LV	±4.5%
Rasmussen Reports/Pulse Opinion Research	October 26, 2010	Barack Obama	42%	Rick Perry	46%	4	500 LV	±4.5%
Rasmussen Reports/Pulse Opinion Research	October 26, 2010	Barack Obama	45%	Mitt Romney	41%	4	500 LV	±4.5%

== See also ==
- Early/Mid 2012 statewide opinion polling for the 2012 United States presidential election
- Statewide opinion polling for the 2012 United States presidential election
- Nationwide opinion polling for the 2012 United States presidential election
- Nationwide opinion polling for the 2012 Republican Party presidential primaries
- Statewide opinion polling for the 2012 Republican Party presidential primaries
- Statewide opinion polling for the 2008 United States presidential election
- 2012 Republican Party presidential primaries
