= Herman Cain =

American businessman (1945–2020)

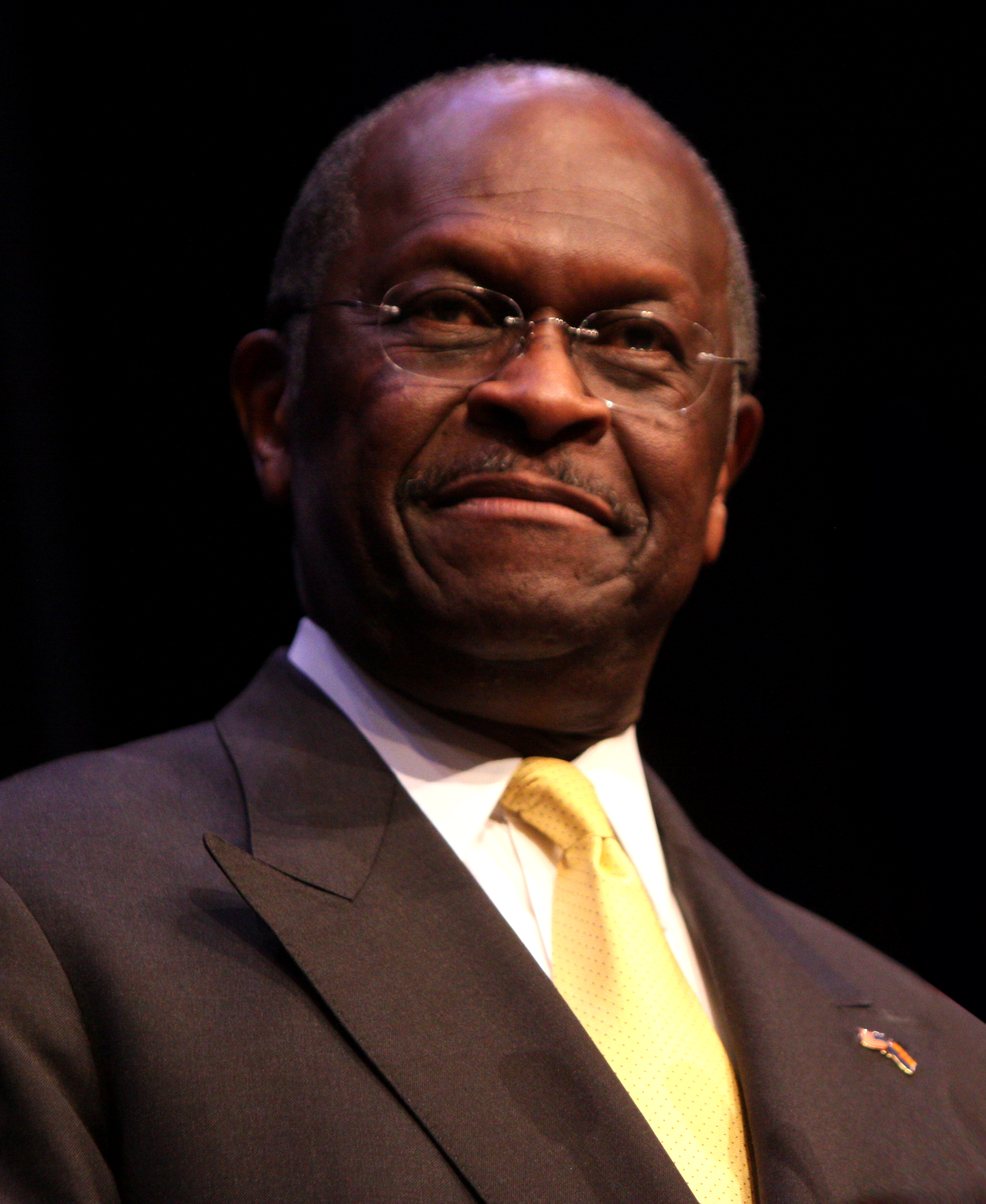
- Cain in 2011

Chair of the Federal Reserve Bank of Kansas City
- In office January 1, 1995 – August 19, 1996
- President: Thomas M. Hoenig
- Preceded by: Burton Dole
- Succeeded by: Drue Jennings

Co-Chair of Black Voices for Trump
- In office November 2019 – July 2020

Personal details
- Born: December 13, 1945 Memphis, Tennessee, U.S.
- Died: July 30, 2020 (aged 74) Atlanta, Georgia, U.S.
- Cause of death: COVID-19
- Party: Republican
- Spouse: Gloria Etchison (m. 1968)
- Children: 2
- Education: Morehouse College (BS); Purdue University (MS)

Herman Cain (December 13, 1945 – July 30, 2020) was an American businessman and Tea Party movement activist in the Republican Party.

Cain graduated from Morehouse College with a bachelor's degree in mathematics. He then earned a master's degree in computer science at Purdue University while also working full-time for the U.S. Department of the Navy. In 1977, he joined the Pillsbury Company where he later became vice president. During the 1980s, Cain's success as a business executive at Burger King prompted Pillsbury to appoint him as chairman and CEO of Godfather's Pizza, in which capacity he worked from 1986 to 1996.

Cain was chairman of the Federal Reserve Bank of Kansas City Omaha Branch from 1989 to 1991. He was deputy chairman, from 1992 to 1994, and then chairman until 1996, of the Federal Reserve Bank of Kansas City. In 1995, he was appointed to the Kemp Commission and, in 1996, he served as a senior economic adviser to Bob Dole's presidential campaign. From 1996 to 1999, Cain was president and CEO of the National Restaurant Association.

In May 2011, Cain announced his 2012 presidential candidacy. By the fall, his proposed 9–9–9 tax plan and debating performances had made him a serious contender for the Republican nomination. In November, however, Cain was accused of sexual harassment by multiple women. Cain denied the allegations but announced the suspension of his campaign on December 3. He remained active in the Republican Party and was a co-chairman of Black Voices for Trump in the 2020 election cycle. Cain died from COVID-19 on July 30, 2020, at the age of 74.

== Early life ==
Herman Cain was born on December 13, 1945, in Memphis, Tennessee, to Lenora Davis Cain (1925–1982), a cleaning woman and domestic worker, and Luther Cain (1925–2005), who was raised on a farm and worked as a barber and janitor, as well as a chauffeur for Robert W. Woodruff, the president of The Coca-Cola Company. Cain said that as he was growing up, his family was "poor but happy." Cain related that his mother taught him about her belief that "success was not a function of what you start out with materially, but what you start out with spiritually." His father worked three jobs to own his own home—which he achieved during Cain's childhood—and to allow his two sons to attend college.

Cain grew up on the west side of Atlanta, attending S. H. Archer High School and the Rev. Cameron M. Alexander's Antioch Baptist Church North in the neighborhood now known as The Bluff. Eventually the family moved to a modest brick home on Albert Street in the Collier Heights neighborhood. He graduated from high school in 1963.

== Education and career ==
In 1967, Cain graduated from Morehouse College with a Bachelor of Science in mathematics. In 1971, he received a Master of Science in computer science from Purdue University, while working full-time as a ballistics analyst for the U.S. Department of the Navy as a civilian.

After completing his master's degree at Purdue, Cain left the Department of the Navy and began working for Coca-Cola in Atlanta as a computer systems analyst. In 1977, he moved to Minneapolis to join Pillsbury, becoming director of business analysis in its restaurant and foods group in 1978.

=== Burger King and Godfather's Pizza ===
At age 36, Cain was assigned to analyze and manage 400 Burger King stores in the Philadelphia area. At the time, Burger King was a Pillsbury subsidiary. Under Cain, his region posted strong improvement in three years. According to a 1987 account in the Minneapolis Star Tribune, Pillsbury's then-president Win Wallin said, "He was an excellent bet. Herman always seemed to have his act together." At Burger King, Cain "established the BEAMER program, which taught our employees, mostly teenagers, how to make our patrons smile" by smiling themselves. It was a success: "Within three months of the program's initiation, the sales trend was moving steadily higher."

Cain's success at Burger King prompted Pillsbury to appoint him president and CEO of another subsidiary, Godfather's Pizza. On his arrival on April 1, 1986, Cain told employees, "I'm Herman Cain and this ain't no April Fool's joke. We are not dead. Our objective is to prove to Pillsbury and everyone else that we will survive." Godfather's Pizza was performing poorly, having slipped in ranks of pizza chains from third in 1985 to fifth in 1988. Under Cain's leadership, Godfather's closed approximately 200 restaurants and eliminated several thousand jobs, and by doing so returned to profitability. In a leveraged buyout in 1988, Cain, executive vice president and COO Ronald B. Gartlan, and a group of investors bought Godfather's from Pillsbury.

=== Federal Reserve Bank and National Restaurant Association ===
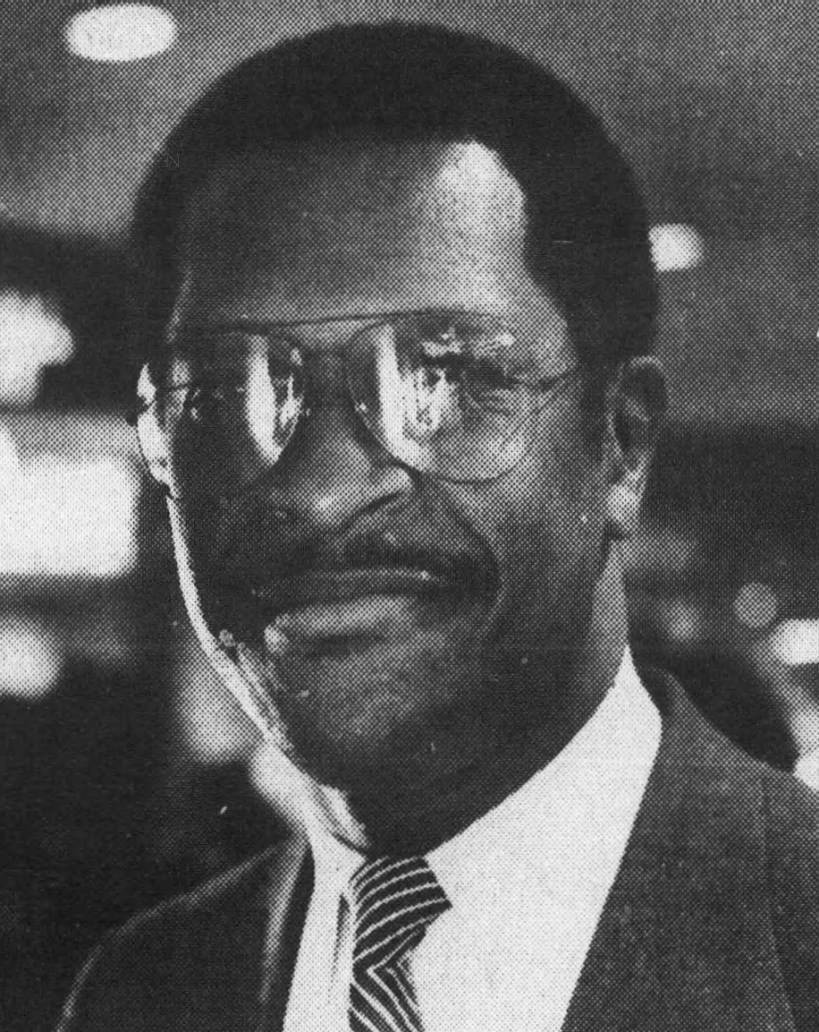
Cain in a July 1987 issue of the Minnesota Star Tribune recognizing his leadership at Godfather's Pizza

Cain served as chairman of the board of the Omaha Branch of the Federal Reserve Bank of Kansas City from January 1, 1989, to December 31, 1991. He became a member of the board of directors of the Federal Reserve Bank of Kansas City in 1992. He served as deputy chairman from January 1, 1992, to December 31, 1994, and then as its chairman until August 19, 1996, when he resigned to become active in national politics.

Cain left Godfather's Pizza in 1996 and moved to the District of Columbia. From 1996 to 1999 he served as CEO of the National Restaurant Association, a trade group and lobbying organization for the restaurant industry, on whose board of directors he had previously served. Cain's lobbying work for the association led to a number of connections to Republican lawmakers and politicians. Under Cain's leadership, the Association lobbied against increases to the minimum wage, mandatory health care benefits, regulations against smoking, and lowering the blood alcohol limit that determines whether one is driving under the influence.

Cain was on the board of directors of Aquila, Inc., Nabisco, Whirlpool, Reader's Digest, and AGCO.

=== Media work ===
Cain wrote a syndicated op-ed column, which was distributed by the North Star Writers Group.

Cain appeared in the 2009 documentary An Inconvenient Tax. From 2008 to February 2011, Cain hosted The Herman Cain Show on Atlanta talk radio station WSB. On January 19, 2012, Cain began working for WSB again by providing daily commentaries, while occasionally filling in for Erick Erickson and Neal Boortz.

Cain took over Boortz's radio talk show on January 21, 2013, upon Boortz's retirement. The show was dropped from the Westwood One Radio Network in December 2016 in favor of The Chris Plante Show, but continued to air in limited syndication through WSB's owner, Cox Radio.

On February 15, 2013, Fox News Channel announced Cain would join the network as a contributor. In March 2019, Cain was a panelist on a Watter's World episode.

=== Recognition ===
Cain received the 1996 Horatio Alger Award and was bestowed with honorary degrees from Creighton University, Johnson & Wales University, Morehouse College, the University of Nebraska–Lincoln, the New York City College of Technology, Purdue University, Suffolk University, and Tougaloo College.

Then former Secretary of Housing and Urban Development, Jack Kemp, referred to Cain as "the Colin Powell of American capitalism". Kemp stated that Cain's "conquests won't be counted in terms of countries liberated or lives saved, but in those things that make life worth living—expanding opportunity, creating jobs and broadening horizons, not just for those he knows, but through his example, for those he'll never meet."

=== Possible nomination to the Federal Reserve Board ===
On April 4, 2019, President Donald Trump said that he intended to nominate Cain to the second of the two vacant seats on the Federal Reserve Board. Assessing the possible nomination, news publications reviewed Cain's sexual misconduct allegations that preceded his withdrawal from the 2012 presidential election. Cain acknowledged that the nomination process would be "more cumbersome" for him due to his "unusual career". He initially stated that he was not considering withdrawing his name from consideration for the seat. After it appeared likely that he would not receive enough votes to support his confirmation, Cain withdrew on April 22, 2019.

=== Black Voices for Trump ===
In the 2020 election cycle, Cain was a co-chairman of Black Voices for Trump.

== Political activities ==
=== Role in the defeat of 1993 Clinton health care plan ===
In 1994, as president-elect of the National Restaurant Association, Cain challenged President Bill Clinton on the costs of the employer mandate contained within the Health Security Act and criticized the effect on small businesses. Bob Cohn of Newsweek described Cain as one of the primary opponents of the plan:

The Clintons would later blame "Harry and Louise," the fictional couple in the ads aired by the insurance industry, for undermining health reform. But the real saboteurs are named Herman and John. Herman Cain is the president of Godfather's Pizza and president-elect of the National Restaurant Association. An articulate entrepreneur, Cain transformed the debate when he challenged Clinton at a town meeting in Kansas City, Missouri. Cain asked the president what he was supposed to say to the workers he would have to lay off because of the cost of the "employer mandate". Clinton responded that there would be plenty of subsidies for small businessmen, but Cain persisted. "Quite honestly, your calculation is inaccurate," he told the president. "In the competitive marketplace it simply doesn't work that way."

— Bob Cohn, The Lost Chance, Newsweek

Because Kemp was impressed with Cain's performance, he chartered a plane to Nebraska to meet Cain after the debate. As a result, Cain was appointed to the Kemp Commission in 1995.

Joshua Green of The Atlantic called Cain's exchange with President Clinton his "auspicious debut on the national political stage."

=== Senior adviser to 1996 Dole campaign ===
Cain was a senior economic adviser to the Bob Dole presidential campaign in 1996.

=== 2000 presidential campaign ===
Cain briefly ran for the Republican presidential nomination in 2000. He later said in looking back at the effort that it was more about making political statements than winning the nomination. "George W. Bush was the chosen one, he had the campaign DNA that followers look for." However, Cain went on to state, "I believe that I had a better message and I believe that I was the better messenger." After ending his own campaign, however, he endorsed Steve Forbes.

=== 2004 U.S. Senate campaign ===
In 2004 Cain ran for the U.S. Senate in Georgia and did not win in the primaries. He was pursuing the seat that came open with the retirement of Democrat Zell Miller. Cain sought the Republican nomination, facing congressmen Johnny Isakson and Mac Collins in the primary. Collins tried to paint Cain as a moderate, citing Cain's support for affirmative action programs, while Cain argued that he was a conservative, noting that he opposed the legality of abortion except when the mother's life is threatened. Cain finished second in the primary with 26.2% of the vote, ahead of Collins, who won 20.6%, but because Isakson won 53.2% of the vote, Isakson was able to avoid a runoff.

=== Americans for Prosperity and America's PAC ===
Starting in 2005, Cain worked for the political advocacy group Americans for Prosperity (AFP) alongside Mark Block. Block would later become campaign manager for Cain's 2012 presidential run and would be joined in Cain's campaign by several other AFP employees. Cain continued to receive honoraria for speaking at AFP events until he announced his campaign for the Republican nomination. Cain's senior economic advisor during his 2012 presidential campaign, Rich Lowrie, who helped devise Cain's 9–9–9 tax plan, had served on the AFP board. In 2006, Cain voiced several radio ads encouraging people of color to vote Republican; the ads were funded by a group called America's PAC and its founder J. Patrick Rooney.

=== 2012 presidential campaign ===
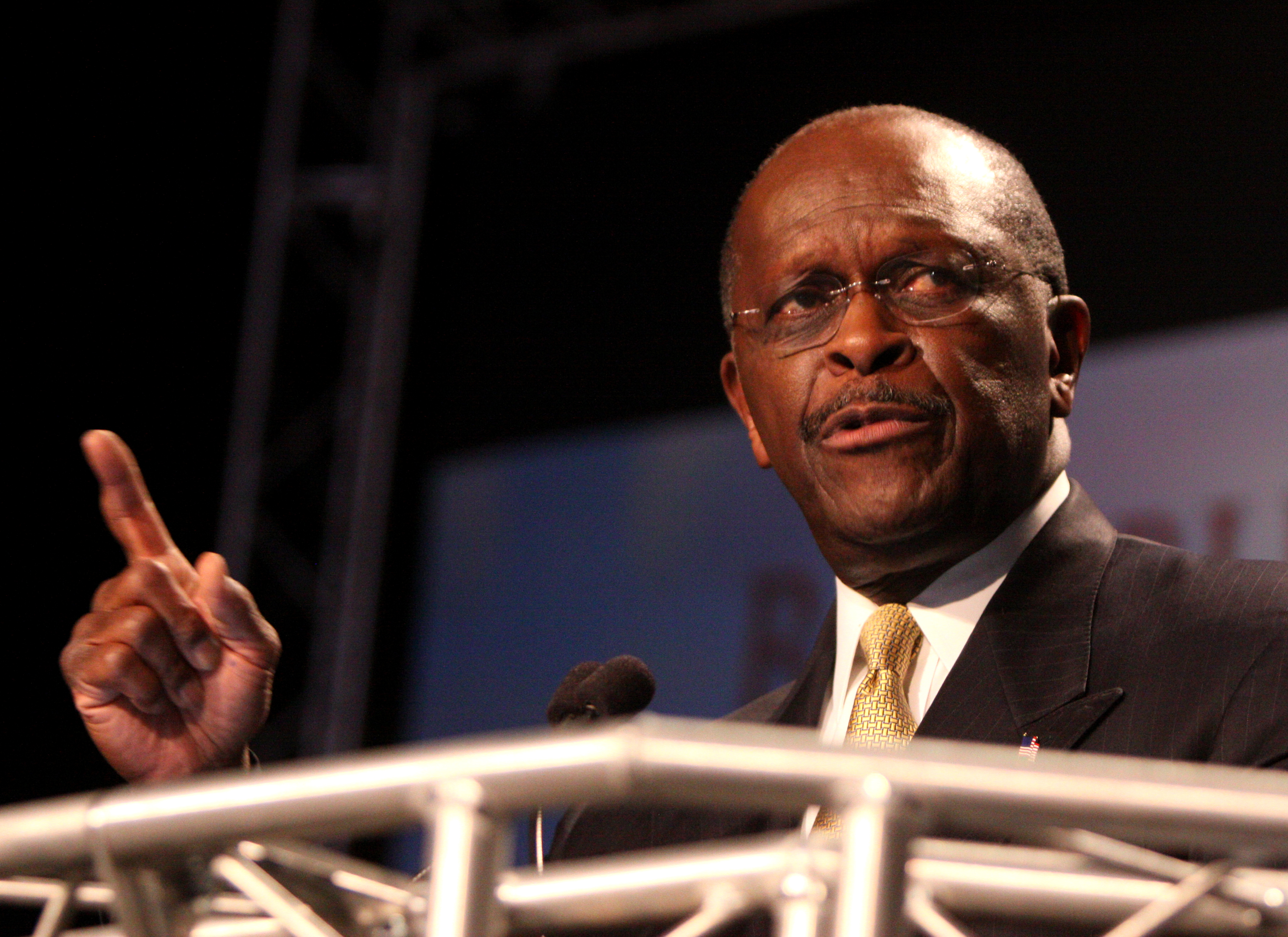
Cain speaking at the Ames Straw Poll in August 2011

A Tea Party activist, Cain addressed numerous Tea Party rallies in 2010. Following the 2010 midterm elections, Cain announced his intentions to run for president in December 2010, stating that there was a 70% chance that he would attempt to seek the office. Later that month, he was the "surprise choice" for 2012 GOP nominee in a RedState reader poll. Cain announced the formation of an exploratory committee on January 12, 2011, before formally announcing his candidacy on May 21 in Atlanta.

==== Straw poll victories ====
Cain's addresses to conservative groups were well received, and in late September and early October 2011, Cain won the straw polls of the Florida Republican Party, TeaCon, and the National Federation of Republican Women's Convention. "My focus groups have consistently picked Herman Cain as the most likeable candidate in the debates," said GOP pollster Frank Luntz. "Don't underestimate the power of likability, even in a Republican primary. The more likeable the candidate, the greater the electoral potential."

==== 9–9–9 Plan ====
In July 2011, an advisor suggested that his campaign's tax policy plan be called "the Optimal Tax", but Cain rejected the name, saying "we're just going to call it what it is: 9–9–9 Plan." The plan would have replaced the then current tax code with a 9-percent business transactions tax, a 9-percent personal income tax, and a 9-percent federal sales tax. During a debate on October 12, Cain said his plan "expands the base," arguing that "when you expand the base, we can arrive at the lowest possible rate, which is 9–9–9." An analysis released to Bloomberg News by the campaign claimed that the rate for each of the three taxes could in fact be as low as 7.3%, but "poverty grants"—which Cain described as a lower rate in targeted "empowerment zones"—necessitated a national rate of nine percent. Paul Krugman criticized the plan, saying it shifts much of the current tax burden from the rich to the poor. Arthur Laffer, Lawrence Kudlow, the Club for Growth, and Congressman Paul Ryan spoke favorably of the plan. On October 21, Cain told a crowd in Detroit that the plan would be 9–0–9 for the poor, saying that "if you are at or below the poverty level ... then you don't pay that middle nine on your income." Cain's 9–9–9 plan attracted skepticism from his fellow candidates at numerous Republican debates.

==== Sexual harassment allegations ====
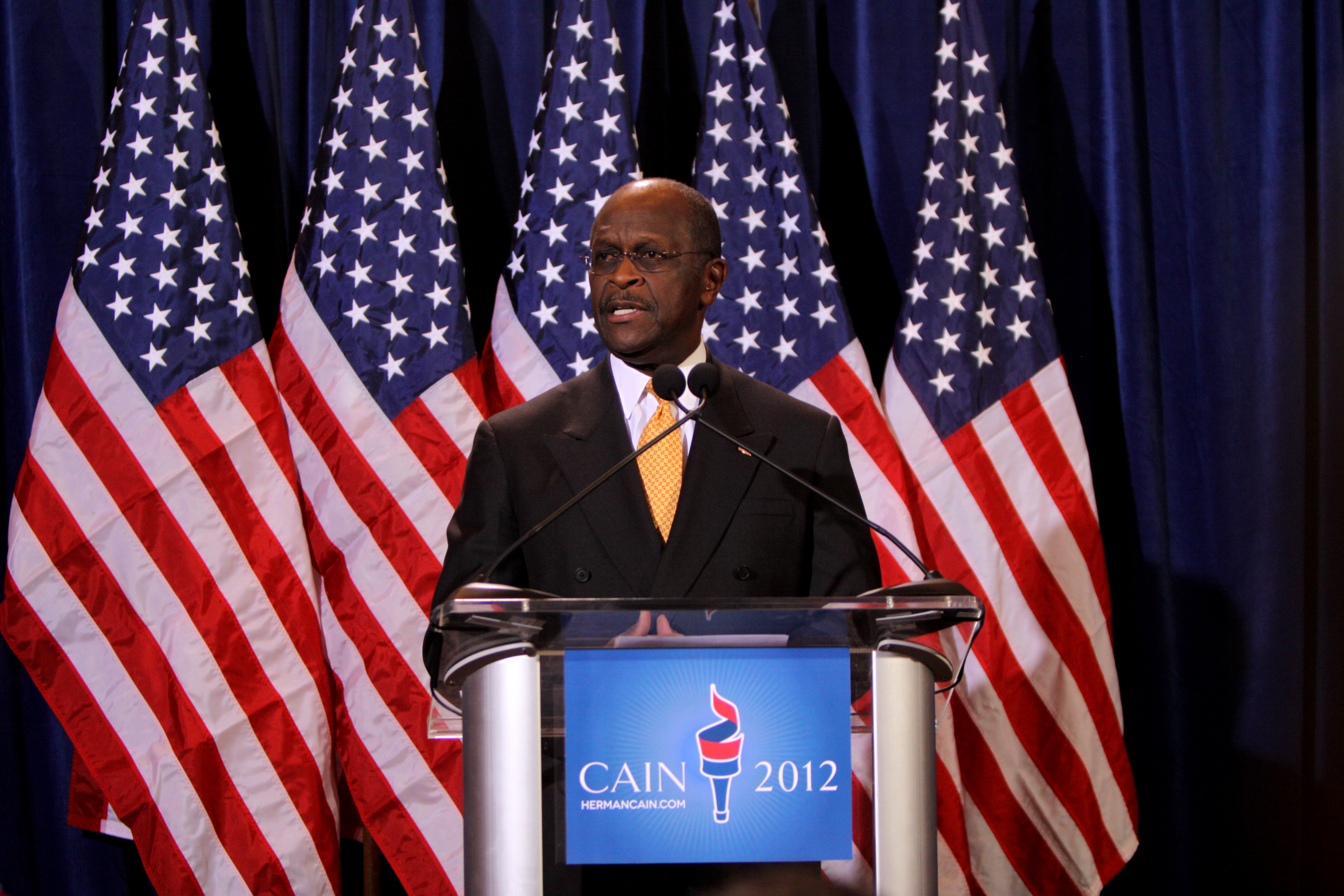
Cain in Scottsdale, Arizona, in November 2011

In late October 2011, Politico reported that Cain had been accused by two women of sexual harassment and misconduct during his time as CEO of the National Restaurant Association in the late 1990s. Two other women made additional harassment accusations later on. Cain acknowledged that the restaurant organization made financial settlements to the complainants. Two of the four women came forward publicly: Sharon Bialek and Karen Kraushaar.

On November 28, 2011, Cain asserted that a woman named Ginger White claimed to have had an affair with him and that the allegation was not true. In an interview with White, which aired on the same day, she stated that the affair lasted 13 years and ended right before Cain announced his presidential campaign. On November 30, 2011, at an event in Dayton, Ohio, Cain denounced the allegations of sexual harassment and adultery.

==== End of 2012 campaign ====
On December 3, 2011, Cain suspended his campaign. The sexual harassment claims were widely considered responsible for the sharp drop in his poll numbers.

According to a Pew Research Center report on December 21, 2011, Cain was the "most covered candidate" among the Republicans during that year.

=== Cain's Solutions Revolution ===
On January 4, 2012, Cain announced the "Cain's Solutions Revolution". Cain's stated goal was to get commitments from members of Congress to support the 9–9–9 Plan before the 2012 elections. Cain stated that he started a new movement because the "biggest comment I got when I ended my candidacy was to keep 9–9–9 alive. That's what this is about, and I'm going to keep it alive with what I'm calling Cain's Solutions Revolution." In order to promote this movement, Cain employed both a bus tour and a new website. New York magazine stated, "It's Cain's earnest effort to keep 9–9–9 alive and focus on solutions." On January 20, 2012, Cain spoke at Stephen Colbert's "Rock Me Like a Herman Cain: South Cain-Olina Primary Rally". The Huffington Post reported the crowd size was between 3,000 and 5,000 people. It was described at the time as "the largest campaign rally so far during this GOP presidential primary season".

=== State of the Union response ===
For President Barack Obama's 2012 State of the Union address, the Tea Party Express chose Cain to give its second annual response. After Indiana Governor Mitch Daniels gave the official GOP response, Cain delivered his speech at the National Press Club. The speech was streamed live on the Tea Party Express website. Cain referred to Obama's address as a "hodgepodge of liberal ideas," adding that there were "no big ideas that would impact job growth" and "no big ideas that would stimulate economic growth in this country."

=== Call for a third party ===
Although Mitt Romney was endorsed by Cain on May 15, 2012, he would eventually lose the general election to President Obama. Cain then told Bryan Fischer that the Republican Party no longer represented the interests of conservatives in the United States and that it did not have "the ability to rebrand itself". He asserted that "a legitimate third party" would be needed to replace it.

== Personal life ==
Cain married Gloria Etchison of Atlanta soon after her graduation from Morris Brown College in 1968. They had a daughter named Melanie, a son named Vincent, and four grandchildren.

Cain served as an associate minister at the Antioch Baptist Church North in Atlanta, which he joined at the age of 10. The church is part of the National Baptist Convention and is politically liberal and theologically conservative. The church's senior pastor, Rev. Cameron M. Alexander, did not share Cain's political philosophy.

In 2006, Cain was diagnosed with stage IV colon cancer that had spread to his liver and was given a 30% chance of survival. After surgery and chemotherapy, the cancer was reported to be in remission.

Disclosures filed during Cain's 2011 campaign categorized his wealth at that time as being between $2.9 and $6.6 million, with his combined income for both 2010 and 2011 being between $1.1 and $2.1 million.

== Death ==
Cain and others, maskless, at the 2020 Tulsa Trump rally in June 2020

Cain opposed wearing face masks and social distancing during the COVID-19 pandemic. He attended the Donald Trump rally in Tulsa on June 20, 2020, and was photographed not wearing a mask in a crowd of people also not wearing masks. On June 29, he tested positive for COVID-19 and was admitted to a hospital in Atlanta two days later. On July 2, his staff said there was "no way of knowing for sure how or where" he became infected. Cain's website editor Dan Calabrese said, "I realize people will speculate about the Tulsa rally, but Herman did a lot of traveling [that] week, including to Arizona where cases [were] spiking."

Cain died of COVID-19 complications at the hospital on July 30, 2020, at the age of 74. His death from COVID-19 following his refusal to protect himself from it led to the creation of the Herman Cain Award subreddit, where users share news stories about people who died from COVID-19 after downplaying its deadliness or expressing doubts about the efficacy of precautions against it. A month after his death, his official Twitter account (which had come under the control of his team and family members) posted that "it looks like the virus is not as deadly as the mainstream media first made it out to be", sparking a discussion about Twitter policies for deceased account holders. In her 2023 memoir Enough, former White House aide Cassidy Hutchinson noted that Trump's Chief of Staff Mark Meadows remarked "we killed Herman Cain" in reference to the 2020 Tulsa rally.

== Bibliography ==
External videos
- Book party for They Think You're Stupid, May 16, 2005, C-SPAN

- "The Intangibles of Implementation" in the technical journal Interfaces (Vol. 9, No. 5, 1979, pp. 144–147), published by the Institute for Operations Research and the Management Sciences (INFORMS).
- Leadership Is Common Sense (2nd ed.). Tapestry. 2000 [1997]. ISBN 978-1-930819-02-3.
- Speak as a Leader. Lebhar-Friedman Books. 1999. ISBN 978-0-86730-782-5.
- CEO of SELF. Tapestry. 2001. ISBN 978-1-930819-04-7.
- They Think You're Stupid: Why Democrats Lost Your Vote and What Republicans Must Do to Keep It. Stroud & Hall. 2011 [2005]. ISBN 978-0-9796462-7-0.
- This Is Herman Cain!: My Journey to the White House. Threshold Editions. 2011. ISBN 978-1-4516-6613-7.
- 9–9–9: An Army of Davids. Velocity Mascot. 2012. ISBN 978-1-62086-030-4.

== See also ==
- 2012 Republican Party presidential candidates
- African-American candidates for President of the United States
- Black conservatism in the United States
- List of African-American Republicans
- List of African-American United States presidential and vice presidential candidates

Business positions
Preceded by William Theisen	President and Chief Executive Officer of Godfather's Pizza; 1986–1996	Succeeded by Ron Gartlan
Preceded by William Fisher	President and Chief Executive Officer of the National Restaurant Association; 1996–1999	Succeeded by Steven Anderson
Government offices
Preceded by Burton Dole	Chair of the Federal Reserve Bank of Kansas City; 1995–1996	Succeeded by Drue Jennings
