= Willie Williams (cornerback, born 1942) =

American football player (1942–2015)

No. 41, 49
- Position: Defensive back

Personal information
- Born: December 29, 1942; Atlanta, Georgia, U.S.
- Died: September 25, 2015 (aged 72); Georgia, U.S.
- Listed height: 6 ft 0 in (1.83 m)
- Listed weight: 190 lb (86 kg)

Career information
- High school: Archer (Atlanta)
- College: Grambling State
- NFL draft: 1965: 8th round, 99th overall pick

Career history
- New York Giants (1965); Oakland Raiders (1966); New York Giants (1967–1973); The Hawaiians (1974-1975)

Awards and highlights
- Pro Bowl (1969); NFL interceptions leader (1968); 96th greatest New York Giant of all-time

Career NFL/AFL statistics
- Interceptions: 35
- INT yards: 462
- Fumble recoveries: 6
- Stats at Pro Football Reference

Willie Albert Williams (December 29, 1942 – September 25, 2015) is an American former professional football player who was a defensive back in the National Football League (NFL) for the New York Giants, as well as the Oakland Raiders of the American Football League (AFL). He played college football for the Grambling State Tigers and was selected 99th overall in the eighth round of the 1965 NFL draft. He led the NFL in interceptions in 1968, and was selected to the Pro Bowl the following season. After playing nine seasons with the NFL and the AFL, Williams played two seasons with The Hawaiians of the World Football League in 1974 and 1975. Williams died on September 25, 2015.
