= North Star Writers Group =

North Star Writers Group was a newspaper syndicate and editorial services firm launched in December 2005. It was based in Byron Center, MI. The syndicate's material was carried by more than 50 newspapers across the United States. It was utilized by some community papers that could not afford opinion writers or cartoonists of their own. On March 7, 2012, its website stated that it had ceased syndicated operations.

== History ==
North Star Writers Group was owned and operated by editor in chief Dan Calabrese and editor relations director Angie Calabrese. The syndicate was a successor company to a now-defunct public relations firm called North Star Public Relations, which Calabrese launched in 1999. Although North Star Public Relations enjoyed some early success, it foundered as the company struggled to maintain financial stability.

Calabrese began his career as a journalist and opinion writer in various Michigan markets. By early 2006 Calabrese decided to retire the public relations practice (a move that was completed at the conclusion of 2006) and focus their efforts on the syndication.

== Recruitment of Writers ==
Calabrese began recruiting columnists in September 2005 in anticipation of a December 2005 site launch. His initial efforts focused on recently graduated college writers who showed skill but would likely be overlooked by more established syndicates. This effort helped North Star recruit Lucia Bill of Arizona State University, Nathaniel Shockey of Seattle Pacific University and Paul Ibrahim of Cornell University. When the syndicate launched, it featured 11 columnists.

Soon after the launch, a variety of other writers learned of the syndicate and began offering their services, including Dayton Daily News feature editor Bob Batz, Mt. Pleasant Daily Sun reporter Eric Baerren, author and freelance writer Candace Talmadge and author/humor writer Mike Ball.

Calabrese did little in the way of formal recruitment of writers, with a notable exception being their outreach to radio talk show host, former U.S. Senate candidate and former Godfather's Pizza chairman Herman Cain, who joined the syndicate one month after its launch.

== Columnists ==
At its zenith, North Star Writers Group syndicated 24 columnists, including 18 op-ed writers, five general feature page columnists, one business humor writer and one cartoonist, Brett Noel.

Liberal op-ed writers included Eric Baerren, Lucia de Vernai, David B. Livingstone, former Gore Communications Director Lawrence J. Haas, Rob Kall, Stephen Silver, Candace Talmadge and Jessica Vozel. Conservative op-ed writers included Calabrese himself, along with Herman Cain, David Karki, former main speechwriter for the 1984 Reagan/Bush campaign Bob Maistros, Paul Ibrahim, Jamie Weinstein, and Nathaniel Shockey. Also included was label-defier Llewellyn King.

Feature writers include Bob Batz ("Senior Moments"), Cindy Droog ("The Working Mom"), Mike Ball ("What I've Learned So Far"), D.F. Krause ("Business Ridiculous"), food writer The Laughing Chef and David J. Pollay ("The Happiness Answer")
