= Burton A. Dole Jr. =

American businessman

Chair of the Federal Reserve Bank of Kansas City
- In office January 1, 1992 – January 1, 1994
- Succeeded by: Herman Cain

Personal details
- Born: October 14, 1937 Chicago Illinois
- Died: October 17, 2026 (aged 89) La Jolla CA
- Party: Republican
- Children: Eric Burton Dole, Karen Jaynes Dole
- Education: Stanford University

Burton A. Dole Jr. (born 1937) is Chairman of Dole/Neal, LLC, a privately held energy management firm.

== Career ==
Dole received both a bachelor's degree in mechanical engineering and a master's degree in business administration from Stanford University after which he held several positions with Hewlett Packard (HP) including General Manager of their Medical Imaging division. He left HP in 1980 to become president, CEO, and chairman of Puritan Bennett, positions he held until 1995. He was deputy chairman and later chairman of the Federal Reserve Bank of Kansas City during the 1990s, succeeded in both offices by Herman Cain.
