= Kemp Commission =

Tax reform commission

The Kemp Commission, headed by former United States Secretary of Housing and Urban Development Jack Kemp, was a tax reform commission that recommended the current Income tax in the United States be replaced with a flat tax.

== History ==
In 1995, the commission was set up by Robert Dole and Newt Gingrich to study ways to encourage economic growth. After Dole and Gingrich chose Kemp as chairman, each appointed four additional members to the commission. During January 1996, the Kemp Commission reported on overhauling the tax system.

== Proposal ==
The commission concluded that "a flat rate tax would not only be a fairer system for middle-income Americans but also would abolish income taxes for relatively poor people by providing for a generous personal exemption."

The Kemp Commission laid out 6 "points of policy" in its proposal:

- A single tax rate
- Large personal and dependent exemptions to remove lower-income people from the tax rolls
- Lower tax rates for families
- Allowing workers to deduct Social Security and Medicare payroll taxes
- Ending taxation of interest, dividends and capital gains
- Requiring a two-thirds majority in Congress to raise the tax rate.

== Response ==
William G. Gale wrote in a response for the Brookings Institution that "the report is symptomatic of the whole debate on tax reform: there is widespread agreement on the principles of tax reform, much less agreement on what those principles mean in practice, and perhaps very little on how to trade off one principle against another. But the revenue estimates provided above suggest that all of the stated goals of the commission cannot be achieved simultaneously: choices will have to be made between desirable features of the rate structure, the tax base, and extent and direction of social policy."

Accounting firm, Coopers & Lybrand, concluded "that a flat tax offering exemptions for homeownership, charitable contributions, investments, payroll taxes and other priorities favored by the panel would require a rate of at least 25 percent to keep from adding to the deficit."

== See also ==
- Tax reform
