= S. H. Archer High School =

Coordinates: 33.804837°N 84.461843°W

Samuel Howard Archer High School was a high school in the northwestern part of Atlanta, Georgia, United States, which existed from 1950 through 1995, when it was merged with Harper High School to form Harper-Archer High School, which in turn closed in 2002.

A member of Atlanta Public Schools, Archer High was located at 2250 Perry Boulevard, N.W., Atlanta, Georgia. Westside Charter School currently stands on the site.
