= Stephen Moore (writer) =

American economic commentator (born 1960)

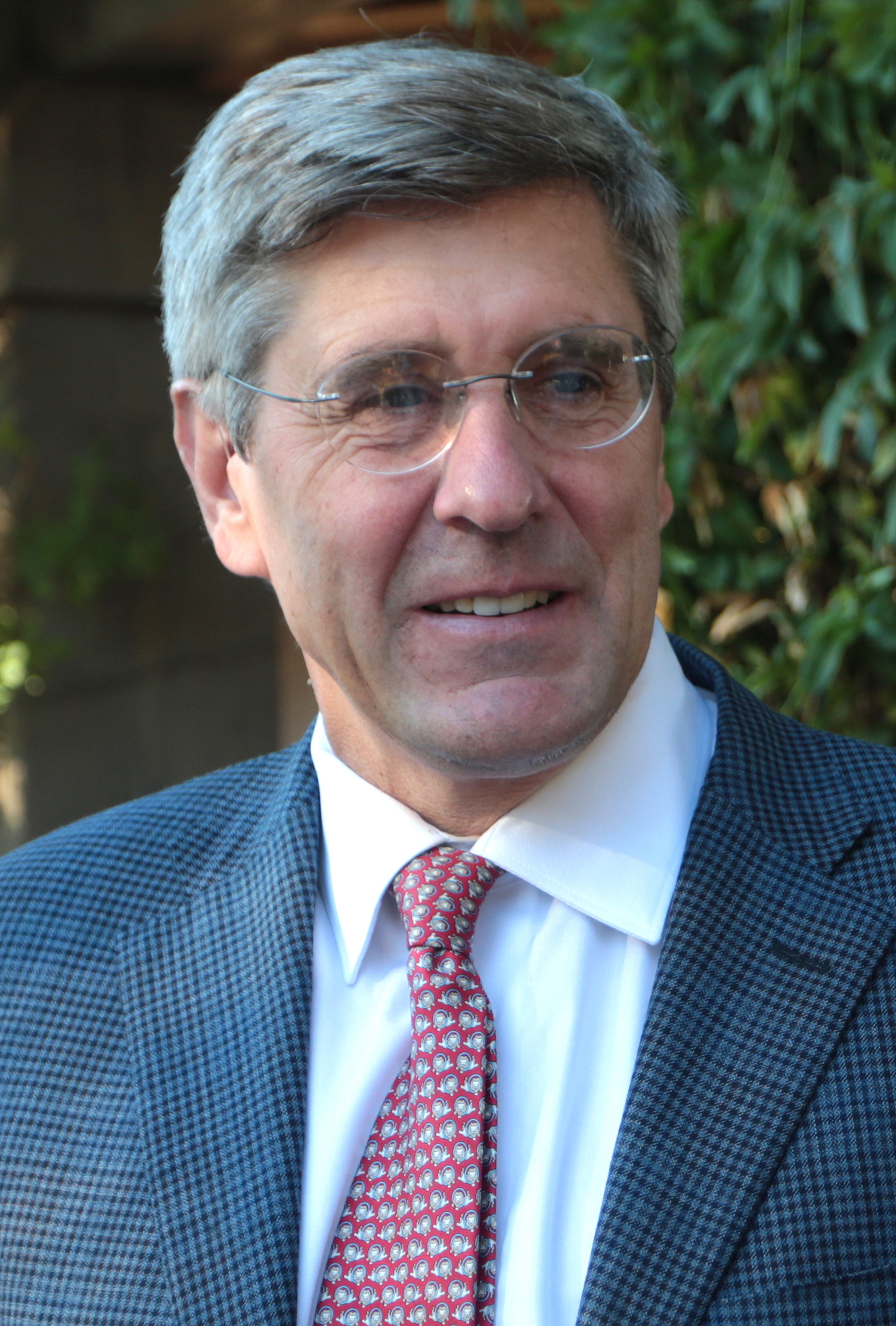
- Born: February 16, 1960 (age 66); Winnetka, Illinois, U.S.
- Organization: Club for Growth (1999–2004)
- Political party: Republican
- Movement: American conservatism

Academic background
- Education: University of Illinois, Urbana-Champaign (BA); George Mason University (MA)
- Influences: Simon; Feulner; Laffer

Academic work
- Discipline: Economics
- School or tradition: Supply-side economics
- Institutions: Cato Institute; The Heritage Foundation (1983–1987, 2014–2025)
- Notable ideas: FairTax

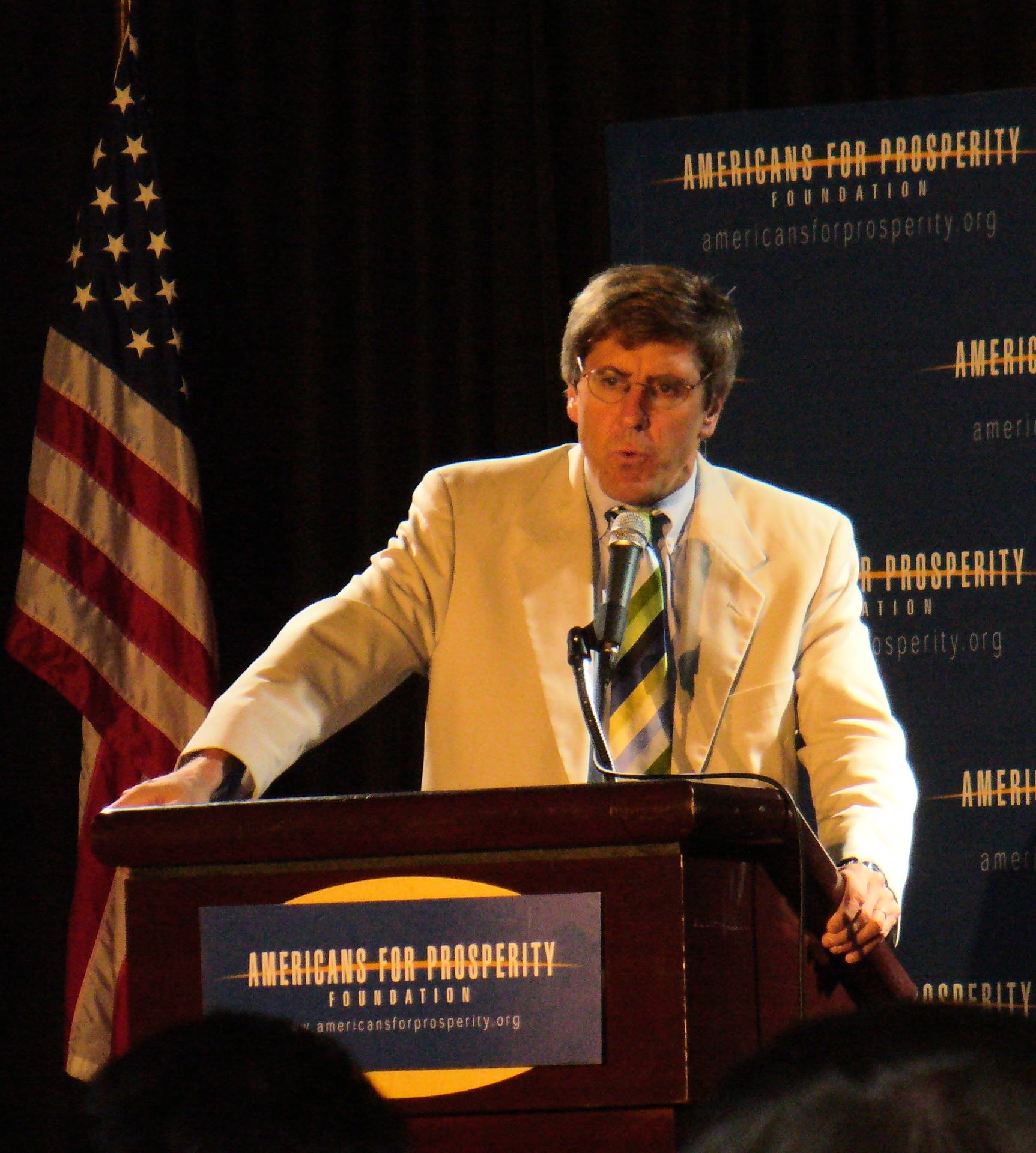
Moore speaking at an Americans for Prosperity Foundation event in 2008

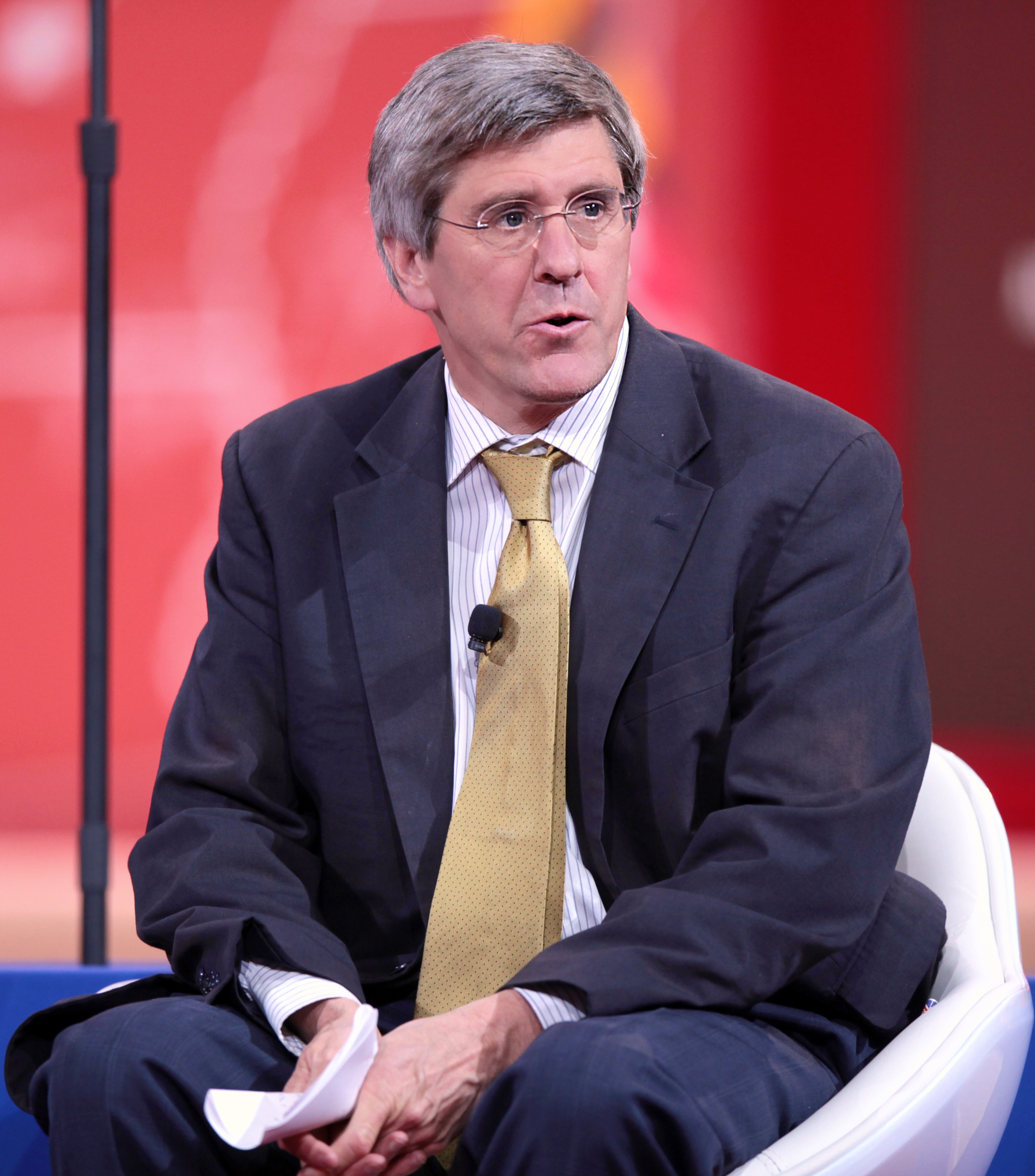
Moore at the 2015 Conservative Political Action Conference

Stephen Moore (born February 16, 1960) is an American economist, writer, and conservative television commentator. He co-founded and served as president of the Club for Growth from 1999 to 2004. Moore is a former member of The Wall Street Journal editorial board. He worked at The Heritage Foundation from 1983 to 1987 and again since 2014. Moore advocates tax cuts and other supply-side policies. His columns have appeared in The Wall Street Journal, The Washington Times, The Weekly Standard, and National Review.

Moore advised the presidential campaigns of Herman Cain in 2012 and Donald Trump in 2016. Along with Larry Kudlow, Moore advised the Trump administration during the writing and passage of the Tax Cuts and Jobs Act of 2017. Amid bipartisan resistance in spring 2019, Moore withdrew his name from consideration to serve on the Federal Reserve Board of Governors.

== Education ==
Moore grew up in New Trier Township, Illinois. He attended Saints Faith Hope & Charity School in Winnetka and graduated from New Trier High School in 1978. He received a Bachelor of Arts (B.A.) from the University of Illinois at Urbana–Champaign and a Master of Arts (M.A.) in economics from George Mason University.

== Career ==
From 1983 to 1987, Moore served as the Grover M. Hermann Fellow in Budgetary Affairs at The Heritage Foundation. In 1987, Moore was the research director of President Ronald Reagan's Privatization Commission. Moore spent ten years as a fellow of the Cato Institute, a libertarian think tank. As senior economist of the U.S. Congress Joint Economic Committee under Chairman Dick Armey of Texas, Moore was said to be "instrumental in creating the FairTax proposal".

In 1999, Moore co-founded and became president of the Club for Growth, a group advocating tax cuts and a reduction in government spending, along with supporting political candidates who favored free-market economic policies. While president of the group, Moore targeted "Republicans in Name Only" whom he viewed as not aligned with his anti-tax views; he criticized Republican Senators who did not readily embrace tax cuts, including Arlen Specter, Olympia Snowe, and George Voinovich.

At the Club for Growth, Moore sought to change the Republican Party, saying in 2003, "We want to take over the party's fundraising. We want it to be, in 10 years, that no one can win a Senate or a House seat without the support of the Club for Growth." From 2003 to 2004, the Club for Growth was the single largest fundraiser for Republican House and Senate candidates, being outdone only by the Republican party itself.

In December 2004, the Club for Growth's board voted to remove Moore as president, with his opponents within the organization upset by his criticism of President George Bush and by the narrow defeat of Senator Pat Toomey, who had the group's support. After Moore's departure, lawyers for the group sent letters to him and members of his new organization, the Free Enterprise Fund, threatening legal action for allegedly stealing the group's mailing list to raise funds for his new organization; Moore's partner Mallory Factor stated the list was acquired elsewhere.

After he left the Club for Growth, Moore founded the 501(c)(4) Free Enterprise Fund with other former Club for Growth members including Arthur Laffer and Mallory Factor. In 2005, Moore left the Free Enterprise Fund to serve on the editorial board of the Wall Street Journal.

On September 19, 2005, the Federal Election Commission (FEC) filed suit against the Club For Growth, alleging that the group had failed to register as a political action committee in the 2000, 2002, and 2004 election cycles "despite spending millions of dollars on federal campaign activity during the 2000, 2002, and 2004 election cycle." In 2007, the FEC and the Club for Growth agreed to settle the lawsuit, paying $350,000.

Moore was involved with the consulting firms Arduin, Laffer & Moore Econometrics, and 32 Advisors. In May 2015, Moore co-founded the advocacy group Committee to Unleash Prosperity with Laffer, Larry Kudlow, and Steve Forbes.

Moore advised Herman Cain, a former presidential candidate and business executive, on his 9-9-9 Tax Plan for his 2012 presidential campaign.

In 2014, The Heritage Foundation announced that Moore would rejoin the think tank as chief economist. Since March 2015 his profile on the Heritage website has described him as a "Distinguished Visiting Fellow."

In 2017, Moore worked with Larry Kudlow on overhauling the US tax policy for the Trump administration, which was eventually passed into law by Congress.

In 2017, he left Fox News Channel to join CNN as a senior economic analyst, leaving that position in early 2019.

In 2025, he left The Heritage Foundation.

== Writings and statements ==
In July 2008, as the Fed had for months been rapidly cutting interest rates as the economy weakened into what became the Great Recession, Moore stated, "I happen to believe we should be raising rates, not cutting them."

Moore supports abolishing the income tax, and replacing it with a national sales tax.

Moore rejects the scientific consensus on climate change. In 2009, he described climate change as "the biggest scam of the last two decades". In columns and op-eds, Moore called those with concerns about climate change "Stalinistic" and has accused climate scientists of being part of a global conspiracy to obtain money via research grants. In an April 2019 interview, Moore said that the Federal Reserve should not consider the economic impacts of climate change in decision-making. "The Fed's job is to keep prices stable; that's all it is," he said. "It's not to get involved in political and policy issues."

Moore wrote a 2014 Kansas City Star opinion piece entitled, "What's the matter with Paul Krugman?," responding to Krugman's earlier opinion piece "Charlatans, Cranks and Kansas", which had discussed a recent major tax cut in Kansas. Moore said that job creation had been superior in low-taxation states during the five years ending June 2009 following the recession. After errors were found in Moore's data, he sought to correct the errors with different data that were also incorrect. Miriam Pepper, editorial page editor for the Star stated "I won't be running anything else from Stephen Moore." Moore acknowledged his error in an email that also said, "My point is that they don't change the conclusion that the no income tax states have substantially outperformed the high income tax states over every period since about 1970…."

In a 2014 op-ed in The Washington Times, Moore cited the role of a "culture of virtue" in America's economic success, writing, "What is irrefutable is that marriage with a devoted husband and wife in the home is a far better social program than food stamps, Medicaid, public housing or even all of them combined."

Moore has often expressed support for some variation of a gold standard. In 2015, he declared, "We have got to get rid of the Federal Reserve and move towards a gold standard in this country!" Few economists support a gold standard.

During a 2016 debate on the minimum wage, Moore stated, "I'm a radical on this. I'd get rid of a lot of these child labor laws. I want people starting to work at 11, 12."

In 2018, Moore and Laffer wrote the book Trumponomics, in which they lauded the Trump administration's economic policies and criticized the economic performance of the George W. Bush years. Trump endorsed the book in a March 2019 tweet. In the book, Moore and Laffer argue that the Trump administration's 2017 tax plan would raise GDP growth rates to as much as 6% and not increase budget deficits. In a 2019 review of the book, conservative N. Gregory Mankiw, an economics professor at Harvard University and head of the Council of Economic Advisors under President George W. Bush, described the book as "snake-oil economics", writing that Moore and Laffer's analysis was based on "wishful thinking" rather than "the foundation of professional consensus or serious studies from peer-reviewed journals".

Moore asserted in a December 2018 appearance on CNN that the Federal Reserve was causing deflation in the economy, although Commerce Department data showed there was consistent inflation. In April 2019, Moore asserted deflation was "the whole reason the economy was so poor in late 2018", although inflation was 2.2% in the fourth quarter of 2018.

In September 2018, Moore wrote a Wall Street Journal opinion piece entitled, "The Corporate Tax Cut Is Paying for Itself," in which he asserted that "faster-than-expected growth has produced a revenue windfall," when comparing "the August 2018 economic forecast from the Congressional Budget Office with the one from June 2017, before the tax cuts passed." Corporate tax receipts for the fiscal year ended September 2018 were down 31% from the prior fiscal year, the largest decline since records began in 1934, except for during the Great Recession when corporate profits, and hence corporate tax receipts, plummeted.

In February 2019, Moore stated, "There's no bigger swamp in Washington than the Federal Reserve Board. It's filled with hundreds of economists who are worthless, who have the wrong model in their mind. They should all be, they should all be fired and they should be replaced by good economists."

Before his nomination to the Federal Reserve Board, in late December 2018 Moore stated, while on a radio talk show, that he believed "the people on the Federal Reserve Board should be thrown out for economic malpractice".

On March 13, 2019, Moore co-authored a column in the Wall Street Journal which asserted that the Federal Reserve's policies were slowing the economy and causing "wild swings in the stock market", at a time when the Dow Jones Industrial Average was up 13% for the year. He also asserted that the Fed should focus more on commodity price changes rather than overall price changes. Larry Kudlow, the Director of the U.S. National Economic Council, showed the article to President Trump, who decided he wanted to place Moore on the Federal Reserve Board.

Moore called for higher interest rates when the economy was recovering from the Great Recession under Barack Obama, but has called for lower rates when the economy has fully recovered and continues to grow under Donald Trump. Moore stated in August 2018, "I have to confess: I was wrong about inflation in 2009 and 2010. I thought there would be a lot of inflation with the Fed lowering rates to practically zero, and that was wrong."

In April 2020, Moore referred to individuals who protested stay-at-home orders during the coronavirus pandemic as "the modern-day Rosa Parks — they are protesting against injustice and a loss of liberties." He ran a group named Save Our Country, which argued for the reopening of the economy amid the coronavirus pandemic. Moore argued against coronavirus relief in the form of unemployment benefits, arguing that "giving people money" was not an economic stimulus. Moore said, if it were true that it was the stimulus, "we could just give everybody $100,000 and we'd all be rich right? It's just so stupid."

In 2023, Moore co-authored the chapter on the Department of the Treasury in the Heritage Foundation's Project 2025 book, Mandate for Leadership: The Conservative Promise.

== Unsuccessful nomination to Federal Reserve Board ==
=== Nomination ===
On March 22, 2019, Trump announced he would nominate Moore to fill one of the two vacant seats at the Federal Reserve Board of Governors. After the nomination was announced, Moore stated "I'm kind of new to this game, frankly, so I'm going to be on a steep learning curve myself about how the Fed operates, how the Federal Reserve makes it decisions, and this is a real, exciting opportunity for me."

=== Reactions ===
Democratic Senators denounced Moore as unqualified for the post, and called upon Trump to drop the nomination. Democrats also criticized Moore over an unpaid $75,000 tax lien entered against him. Though some key Republican senators expressed support for Moore's nomination, including members of the Senate Banking Committee, enough Republican senators voiced concerns about Moore to place his confirmation in jeopardy. Republican senator Richard Shelby said, "I've always said they could use diversity, you don't need to be a Nobel laureate or University of Chicago professor."

The nomination stirred immediate criticism by economists, and was widely viewed as the most political appointment to the Federal Reserve Board since the 1980s. Benn Steil, director of international economics for the Council on Foreign Relations, stated he found the decision appalling. Monetary economist George Selgin stated he believed Moore was unfit to serve on the Board. Economist Justin Wolfers called the selection of Moore "the first genuinely bad Trump pick for the Fed" and called on the Senate not to confirm Moore. Harvard economics professor Greg Mankiw said that Moore "does not have the intellectual gravitas" for the position. Economist Menzie Chinn noted that Moore has not authored or co-authored any peer-reviewed journal articles.

In April 2019, 105 professors, former government officials, and analysts signed a one-sentence letter expressing support for Moore's candidacy for the Federal Reserve Board. Signatories included Steve Forbes, Ed Feulner, and Bill Ford, the former President of the Federal Reserve Bank of Atlanta. Endorsements for Moore's nomination also came from his long-time collaborator Larry Kudlow, who recommended the appointment, and from Adam Brandon, president of the conservative advocacy group FreedomWorks. Moore's former employer, The Wall Street Journal editorial board, endorsed Moore for the Fed on March 28, 2019. In an appearance on Fox Business Network, political commentator Charlie Gasparino described Steve Moore as "the counterweight to [Chair of the Federal Reserve Jerome] Powell's hawkishness." Journalist Fred Barnes defended Moore as "a disrupter, like Trump."

In April 2019, CNN and The New York Times reported on several articles Moore had written in the National Review in the early 2000s that disparaged women, which Moore dismissed as spoofs or jokes. The Times reported, "Congressional Republicans say [Moore's views on interest rates and the gold standard] are less likely to impede Mr. Moore's confirmation prospects than concerns over his personal life and past statements."

Moore's call on the Federal Reserve to lower interest rates was also controversial. Lowering interest rates was supported by Trump but opposed by Fed chairman Powell and other policymakers at the time. The Federal Reserve later lowered rates by a quarter of a percent in September 2019 and again the next month. Moore reacted by calling it "an example of where I was right, and where my critics were wrong."

=== Withdrawal and aftermath ===
On May 2, 2019, Moore withdrew his name from consideration, saying "The unrelenting attacks on my character have become untenable for me and my family and 3 more months of this would be too hard on us." Following his withdrawal, Moore penned an op-ed in the Wall Street Journal where he decried his critics, writing, "What did me in was not my economic ideas but gutter campaign tactics and personal assaults." Senate Republicans expressed relief that Moore's withdrawal meant that they would not have to cast a vote on his nomination.

After his nomination was withdrawn, Moore returned to his previous positions with FreedomWorks, The Heritage Foundation, and Committee to Unleash Prosperity. Additionally, Moore became chief economic officer of Frax, a cryptocurrency company that branded itself "the world's decentralized central bank".

== Personal life ==
Moore was married to Allison Moore until 2011. In 2012, a Virginia court held Moore in contempt of court for failing to pay his ex-wife $300,000 in spousal support, child support, and other obligations in his divorce settlement. Moore did not respond to repeated court requests to make payments and failed to appear for a deposition before the court threatened to have him arrested and ordered him to sell his home to make the payments; the court revoked the order at Moore's request after he made a $217,000 payment. In January 2018, the IRS obtained a tax lien against Moore for $75,328 in unpaid federal taxes, interest, and penalties, alleging Moore had filed a "fraudulent" tax return in 2014. Moore stated that his accountant made an error in improperly deducting child support payments and that the lien was the result of an IRS miscalculation, though Moore says he paid the lien and Montgomery County, Maryland Circuit Court records show the case is closed. In addition to the child support payments, the IRS also disallowed other deductions Moore had claimed.

Moore has three sons and, as of 2019, is married to Anne Carey.

== Selected bibliography ==
- Privatization: A Strategy for Taming the Deficit (The Heritage Foundation, 1988)
- Still an Open Door? U.S. Immigration Policy and the American Economy (American University Press, 1994)
- (editor) Restoring the Dream: What House Republicans Plan to Do Now to Strengthen the Family, Balance the Budget, and Replace Welfare (Times Mirror, 1995)
- It's Getting Better All the Time: 100 Greatest Trends of the Last 100 Years with Julian L. Simon (Cato Institute, 2000) ISBN 1882577973
- Bullish On Bush: How George Bush's Ownership Society Will Make America Stronger (Madison Books, 2004) ISBN 1568332610
- The End of Prosperity with Arthur B. Laffer and Peter Tanous (Threshold Editions, 2008) ISBN 1416592385
- Crash Landing: How Bush, Bernanke, Pelosi and Obama Have Wrecked the U.S. Economy (And How to Salvage America's Future) (Blackstone Audio, 2014) ISBN 1482923874
- Trumponomics: Inside the America First Plan to Revive Our Economy, with Arthur B. Laffer (All Points Books, 2018) ISBN 978-1250193711
- The Trump Economic Miracle, with Arthur Laffer (Post Hill Press, 2024). The book is about restoring America's prosperity based on pro-business policy ideas, arguing that Donald Trump's pro-growth policies "fueled unprecedented growth and prosperity".

Non-profit organization positions
New office	President of the Club for Growth; 1999–2004	Succeeded by Pat Toomey
