= Orders, decorations, and medals of Grenada =

National honour system of Grenada

The Grenadian honours system his governed by the National Honours and Awards Act of the Parliament of Grenada of 2007. Many were also instituted vis-à-vis the Grenada National Honours Act of 1994. The system is modelled largely on the British honours system, which was formerly conferred on Grenadians. The Governor-General of Grenada serves as the Chancellor of the orders. Membership is conferred by the Governor-General upon the advice of the Prime minister of Grenada. Most Grenadian honours allow recipients to place post-nominal letters after their names, and some honours include pre-nominal styles.

== Honours (in order of precedence) ==
- Order of the National Hero
- Order of the Nation
- Order of Grenada
- Spice Isle Award
- Camerhogne Award
- Grenada Medal of Honour
