= Order of the Nation (disambiguation) =

Order of the Nation is a Jamaican order.

Order of the Nation may also refer to:

- Order of the Nation (Antigua and Barbuda)
- Order of the Nation (Bahamas)
- Order of the Nation (Grenada)
- Order of the Nation (political party), a Czech political party
