= This Is Herman Cain! =

2011 autobiography by Herman Cain

- First edition
- Author: Herman Cain
- Genre: Autobiography
- Publisher: Threshold Editions
- Publication date: October 4, 2011
- Pages: 240 pp.
- ISBN: 978-1451666151
- Followed by: 9–9–9: An Army of Davids

This Is Herman Cain!: My Journey to the White House, an autobiography by Herman Cain, was released on October 4, 2011. The text is published by Threshold Editions. The memoir made the Amazon.com top 10 Best Sellers list.

== Origin and synopsis ==
Cain has previously stated that he has not been familiar with issues related to Israel, and that he was reading "Israel at Sixty: An Oral History of a Nation Reborn,” a text written by Gerald and Deborah Strober. The three collaborated, and the result was, This Is Herman Cain! My Journey to the White House.

Frank Breeden, Cain's literary agent, stated that "the Godfather's Pizza CEO "came on our radar" when he filed his exploratory committee papers in January. Realizing the potential built-in market Cain's campaign would develop, they rushed the process to This Is Herman Cain! out in the fall.

The text describes Cain's story while exploring various issues from poverty and wealth, the segregated South, his wife Gloria, and his battles with cancer. Cain talks about business experience with Coca-Cola Co., Pillsbury, Burger King, and Godfather's Pizza. Cain also details what the first 90 days of a hypothetical Herman Cain administration would look like.

In this memoir, Cain "describes his past and present . . . and the future he is determined to create, a future that will put our country back on track. His message resonates because he describes the American reality, and his down-to-earth personal tale of hope and hard work is both unforgettable and inspirational."

== Response ==
Vick Mickunas, of the Dayton Daily News, stated that, "The book has already cracked the top ten list of best-selling books over on Amazon.com. Not bad. You never know. None of the Republican aspirants seem to be gaining much traction so far. President Herman Cain? You just never know…"

ABC News stated that, "The book chronicles the pizza CEO's rise from rags to riches. It details his early life in the segregated South, meeting his wife, Gloria, and his battle with stage 4 liver and colon cancer. He also gives an in-depth view of his many years in business, moving from the Coca-Cola Co. to Pillsbury to Burger King and then to Godfather's Pizza. Cain isn't shy about portraying what the first 90 days of a Cain administration would look like."

Paul Bedard, of U.S. News & World Report, wrote that Cain's "plan is more show than substance. It starts with some Inaugural atmospherics. Instead of watching the parade then entering the White House to get ready for a night of balls, Cain writes that he will be "sitting at my desk in the Oval Office, because I've got a lot of work to do before I dress for this evening's festivities and I've just convened a meeting of my senior staff, one that will likely last most of the evening." In fact, he plans to cut the number of balls and instead host a series of "celebratory occasions" over his first months in office."

Joshua R. Weaver, of The Root, wrote that "This Is Herman Cain! recounts Cain's life from his modest childhood among the social ills of the segregated South to his rise to success as CEO of one of the nation's largest pizza chains. More than a mere campaign manifesto, Cain's latest autobiography delves into the inner workings of an often misunderstood man, whose tumultuous yet equally triumphant life plays an integral part in his bid for the Oval Office."

Don Gonyea has written that, "Cain's book, meanwhile, is called This Is Herman Cain: My Journey to the White House. His travel schedule has prompted many to wonder if it's all really about selling books. Visits to Iowa have been rare instead he has been in Arkansas, Tennessee, Wisconsin and other places far from the early caucus and primary action. Cain addressed the assertion that his ultimate goal is to land a TV show, like former candidate Mike Huckabee did after his failed 2008 presidential run. "If you know Herman Cain, nothing is further from the truth," Cain said in October. "If you don't believe me, I invite you to get a copy of my new book, This Is Herman Cain, if you can find one, because they are selling like hotcakes." Cain made the comments before allegations of past sexual harassment and an awkward answer to a question about Libya that went viral. Any candidate would worry about the impact of such things on a political campaign. But selling oneself as an author or a TV host or commentator is another matter. Constituents there can be much more forgiving."

Elise Lelon, of the Huffington Post, states that the text is "an I-am-who-I-am autobiography that begins as straightforward as it gets with: "My name is Herman Cain." In it, he describes himself as an anti-politician who disdains Washington's smoke and mirrors. He writes: "I don't do teleprompters – I like to say I'm a leader not a reader," and "We need leadership, not more position-ship.'"

Katrina Trinko, of the National Review, wrote that, "ultimately, Cain views himself as "Barack Obama's worst nightmare!" He muses that perhaps his parents should have made his middle name David because that Biblical figure "defeated a giant against the odds." For Cain, that's the goal in 2012."

== Impact ==
Cain has received criticism concerning his book tour in support of the text, and that his campaign is more about the tour than the presidential campaign. Naureen Khan and Alex Roarty wrote in The Atlantic that "Instead of capitalizing on his newfound momentum by hitting the campaign trail hard, Cain this week opted to spend most of his time promoting his book, This is Herman Cain! My Journey to the White House, which just arrived in retail stores this week. Rather than visit diners in early voting states like Iowa and New Hampshire, he's signing books at Barnes & Noble outlets in Texas and Washington D.C., although his tour does also include several stops in South Carolina and Florida, two key primary states."

As of November 22, 2011, the text has sold 30,000 copies.

== Lawsuit ==
Cain and the publisher, Simon & Schuster, have been sued in U.S. District Court in Atlanta claiming they improperly used a photograph for the cover of This Is Herman Cain!: My Journey to the White House by Adventure Advertising. The lawsuit claims that the photograph was intended solely for his political campaign and that Adventure Advertising still owns the copyright.

== See also ==
- Herman Cain presidential campaign, 2012
