= Mallory Factor =

American professor at The Citadel

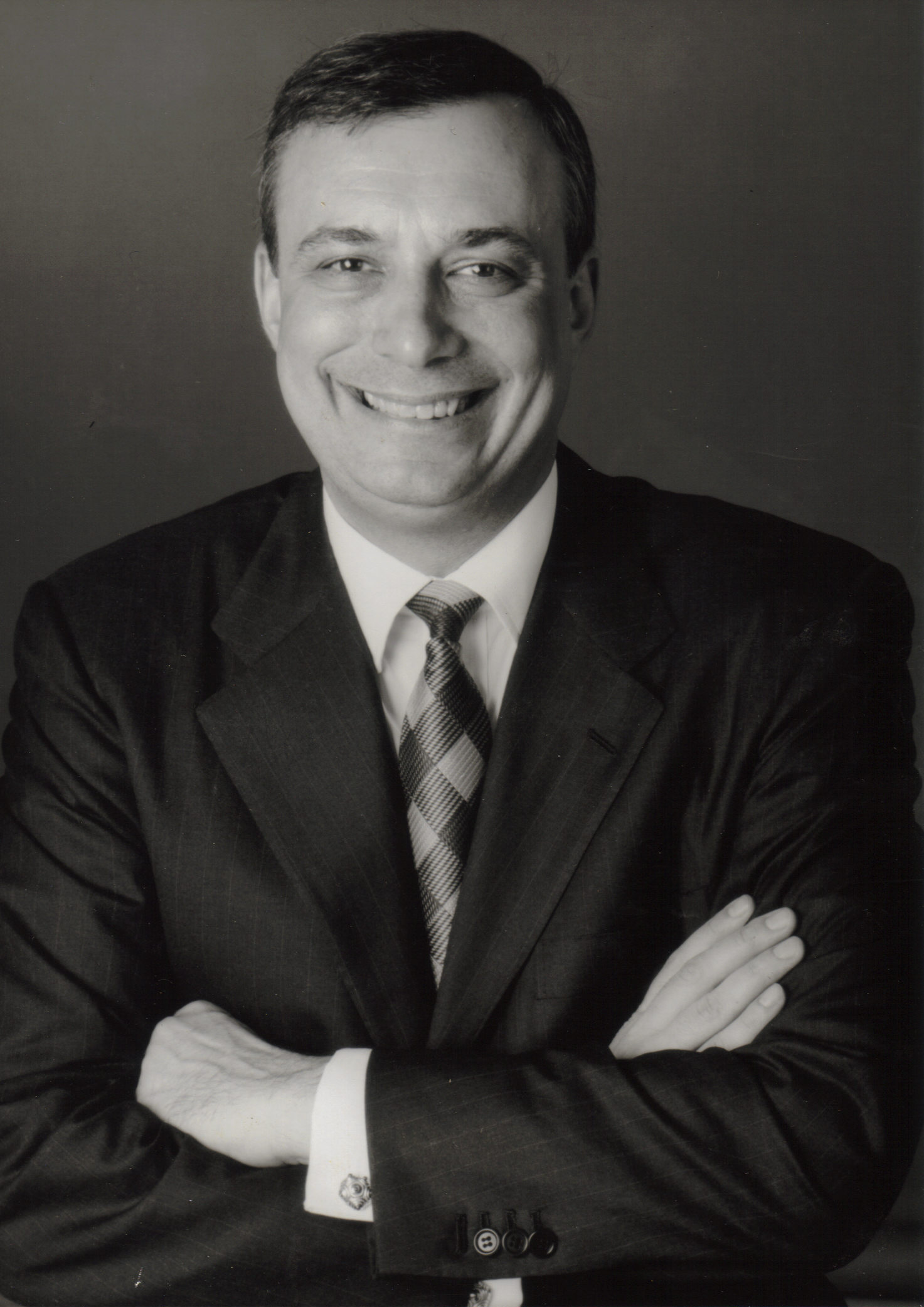
- Born: July 16, 1950 (age 76); Bridgeport, Connecticut, US
- Education: Wesleyan University (B.A., 1972)
- Occupations: Chairman of IntraBio Inc, former professor at The Citadel, The Military College of South Carolina, formerly a banker and public relations specialist
- Spouse: Elizabeth Weir
- Children: 7
- Website: malloryfactor.com

Mallory Factor, KCN (born July 16, 1950) is an American pharmaceutical executive, professor, author, and media contributor. Factor is the founder and executive chairman of IntraBio Inc., a commercial-stage biopharmaceutical company based in Austin, Texas which developed levacetylleucine, commercially known as AQNEURSA, for the treatment of neurological manifestations of Niemann-Pick Disease Type C.

Factor is visiting senior fellow in entrepreneurship at the Department of Pharmacology, University of Oxford, U.K. He was the John C. West Professor (Emeritus) of International Politics and American Government at The Citadel, The Military College of South Carolina.

With his wife Lady Elizabeth Factor, he is co-author of Shadowbosses (2012) and Big Tent: The Story of the Conservative Revolution (2014), which were both New York Times bestsellers.

Factor has written widely on economic and financial issues for publications including the Wall Street Journal, Christian Science Monitor, National Review, and other newspapers and has contributed to BBC, Fox News and Forbes magazine items.

He produces Tony, Olivier, and Drama Desk award-winning, theatre on Broadway, in the West End and globally.

== Early life and education ==
Factor grew up in Bridgeport, Connecticut. He graduated from Wesleyan University in Middletown, Connecticut, and attended Columbia Law School, and Business School in New York, New York.

== Career ==
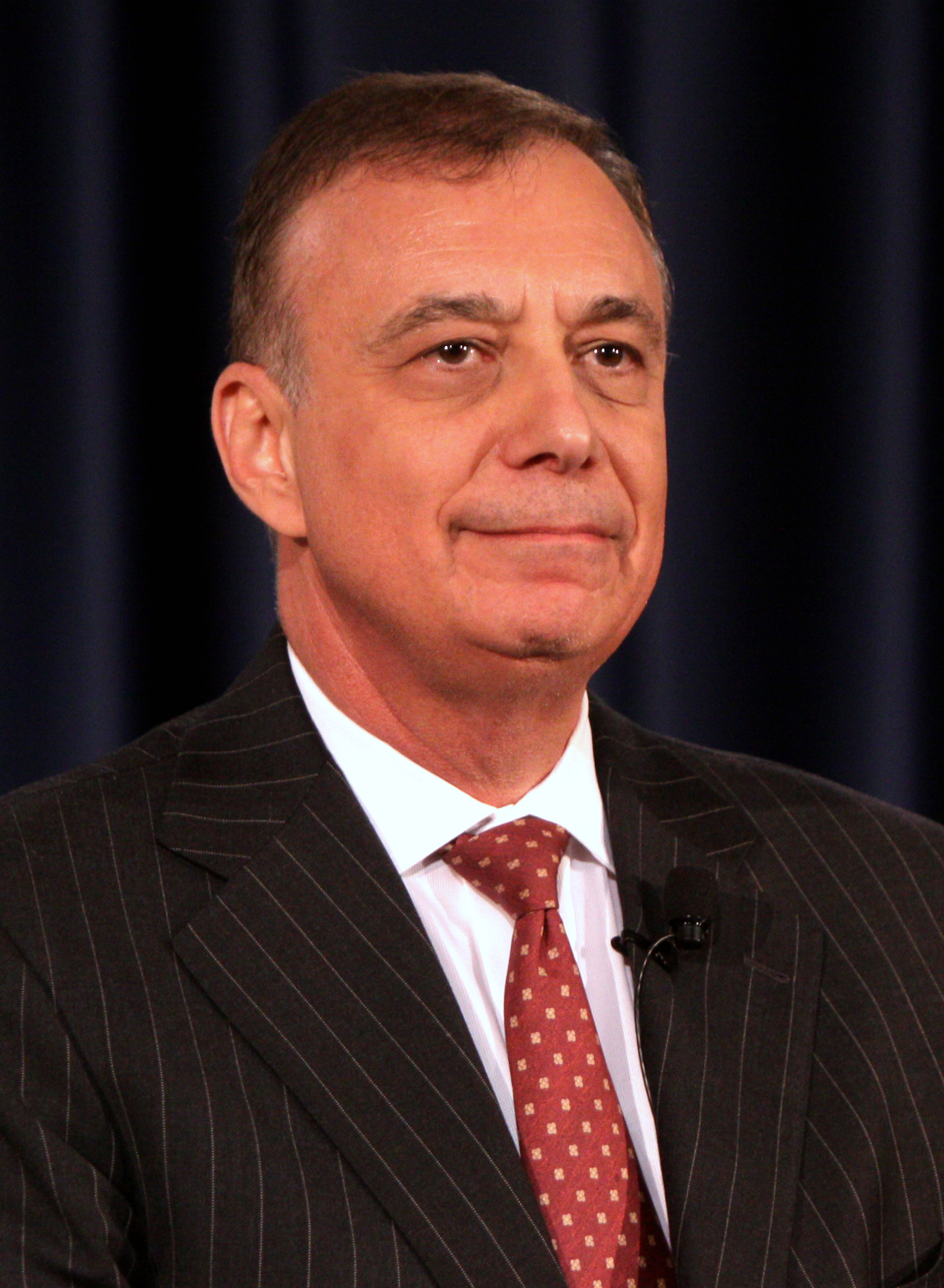
Factor speaking at an event in Chantilly, Virginia.

In 2015, Factor founded IntraBio Inc, a commercial-stage biopharmaceutical company that develops and commercializes novel treatments for rare and common neurodegenerative diseases. In September 2017, the company announced its plans for a multi-national pivotal trial for acetylleucine for the treatment of Niemann–Pick type C, Tay–Sachs disease, and cerebellar ataxia subtypes. In 2020, IntraBio announced the successful multinational clinical trial results of the Niemann-Pick type C clinical trial. In 2021, IntraBio announced the successful multinational clinical trial results of the GM2 Gangliosidosis clinical trial.

In June 2023, IntraBio announced positive results from the pivotal, Phase III IB1001-301 multinational, randomized, placebo-controlled, crossover clinical trial. On September 24, 2024 the US FDA approved AQNEURSA™️ (levacetylleucine) for the treatment of neurological manifestations of Niemann-Pick disease type C (NPC) in adults and pediatric patients weighing ≥15 kg.

Factor was the John C. West Professor (Emeritus) of International Politics and American Government at The Citadel, The Military College of South Carolina in Charleston, South Carolina. He held adjunct professorships at the School of Continuing and Professional Studies at New York University from 1992 to 1996, and at the Graduate School of Management and Urban Professions at the New School for Social Research from 1985 to 1992.

He was chairman of the New York Public Asset Fund from 2002 to 2006 and vice-chairman of Governor's Island Preservation and Education Corporation from 2006 to 2007. Factor was a member of the Banking Board of the New York State Banking Department from 2001 to 2007. From 1987 to 1988, he was a member of the Federal Savings and Loan Advisory Council for the Federal Home Loan Bank. He has been an underwriting member of Lloyd's of London since 1987.

In addition to his books, Factor has written widely on economic and financial issues for publications including the Wall Street Journal, Christian Science Monitor, National Review and newspapers nationwide and was previously also a Fox News and Forbes magazine contributor.

He was president of Mallory Factor, Inc., an independent merchant bank and financial relations consultancy that he founded in 1976. Factor's first job after graduating was serving as a supervisor of management consulting services at Coopers & Lybrand.

=== Civic service ===
Factor was co-founder and host of The New York Meeting and the host of The Charleston Meeting, gatherings of elected officials, journalists, business leaders and authors in New York City and Charleston, South Carolina. He was co-founder and co-chair of The Monday Meeting (with James E. Higgins).

He co-founded and was the chairman of the Free Enterprise Fund, a free market "do" tank advocating economic growth, lower taxes and limited government.

He is a life member of the Council on Foreign Relations and was vice-chair of the Council on Foreign Relations Task Force on Terrorism Financing. He has testified in front of the U.S. House of Representatives and the United States Senate on terror financing, regulation of the financial services industry and other economic issues. Factor chaired the Economic Roundtable for the Chairman of the Joint Chiefs of Staff and led the 2009 Economic Summit for the U.S. House Republican Conference and Policy Committee in Washington, D.C.

He is a Liveryman of the Worshipful Company of Tobacco Pipe Makers and Tobacco Blenders. Factor has been a Senior Advisor in the UK House of Lords since 2014.

=== Broadway and musicals ===
His work includes shows such as A Little Life, Cabaret, A Streetcar Named Desire, Dr Semmelweis, The King and I, A Christmas Carol, Patriots, Macbeth, Wizard of Oz, Constellations, Cyrano, Oklahoma, Hills of California, The Curious Case of Benjamin Button, The Rocky Horror Picture Show, The Piano Lesson, Leopoldstadt, The Merchant of Venice, and Sunset Boulevard.
