= Mark Paredes =

Mark Paredes is the former author of the "Jews and Mormons" blog for The Jewish Journal of Greater Los Angeles and served as a bishop in the Church of Jesus Christ of Latter-day Saints (LDS Church) in Los Angeles. He served as a U.S. diplomat at the United States Embassy in Tel Aviv from 1994 to 1996 and the U.S. Consulate General in Guadalajara, Mexico from 1991 to 1993. He also worked as the press attaché for the Consulate General of Israel in Los Angeles, the National Director of Hispanic Outreach for the American Jewish Congress, and the Executive Director of the Western Region of the Zionist Organization of America.

In addition, Paredes has taught Italian, Russian and Hebrew at Brigham Young University (BYU) and the LDS Institute programs at the University of Texas and Santa Monica College.

== Mormons and Jews ==
Paredes has spoken on Mormon–Jewish relations around the world, both in the U.S. and in 13 European countries. He wrote extensively on the subject, including a regular column in The Jewish Journal of Greater Los Angeles.

== Personal life ==
Paredes was raised in Bay City, Michigan. Paredes joined the LDS Church with his family in 1979. He served a mission for the LDS Church in Italy. He studied law at the University of Texas for three semesters, received a B.A. in Italian from BYU, and studied Russian at the Moscow Institute of Steel and Alloys. He speaks seven languages fluently and has lived in five countries.

Paredes was a member of the LDS Church's Los Angeles California Stake and its Southern California Public Affairs Council, where he chaired the Jewish Relations Committee. He was also a member of the Board of Directors of the BYU Management Society's Los Angeles chapter. In April 2013, Paredes became bishop of the Los Angeles Wilshire Ward.

Paredes married Florina Paredes in the church's Los Angeles California Temple in January 2012. Florina is a native of Romania whom Paredes met in Bucharest while on a speaking tour of Europe. They are the parents of two daughters and a son.

== Controversial remarks ==
Paredes' November 2014 blog post "Good riddance to Harry Reid, the Mormon Senate leader" generated controversy and received criticism from LDS Church spokesman Dale Jones for "publishing such views while using a title of a church officer, even if only as a leader of a local congregation as in this case." In his post, Paredes implied that then-Senate Majority Leader Harry Reid is not worthy to enter an LDS temple, due to his leadership position in the Democratic Party and some of his associated political views, which Paredes claimed included support for abortion rights, gay marriage and the Nevada gambling industry. The LDS Church is officially neutral toward political parties, Top leaders of the church have indicated concern over the perception of church members primarily supporting a single party. and have counseled to separate disagreement over policy from personal attacks on the people supporting those policies. Paredes later added a disclaimer to the blog post, and apologized for the tone of his comments. Paredes had been critical of Reid in past posts, and other Mormons have contested Reid's faith because of his politics.

Paredes has also been highly critical of fellow Mormon Glenn Beck, calling his Restoring Courage tour "delusional self-aggrandizement masquerading as Israel advocacy".

== See also ==
- Philo-Semitism
