= Mark Block =

American political strategist

Member of the Winnebago County Board of Supervisors
- In office 1974–1978

Personal details
- Party: Republican
- Children: 3
- Education: University of Wisconsin–Oshkosh

Mark Block (born October 8, 1954) is an American political strategist who worked as chief of staff and campaign manager for Herman Cain during his unsuccessful 2012 campaign for the Republican presidential nomination. Block has previously worked for Americans for Prosperity.

== Early life and education ==
Block grew up in Weyauwega, Wisconsin, where he graduated from Weyauwega-Fremont High School in 1972. He earned a bachelor's degree from the University of Wisconsin–Oshkosh (1977).

== Career ==
In 1974, Block became the first 18-year-old ever elected to office in Wisconsin, when he won a position on the Winnebago County Board of Supervisors. In the late 1970s, he worked for Republican Congressman William A. Steiger until Steiger's death in 1978, and then took a job with NCR Corporation from 1979 to 1990.

Block founded several organizations including the MacIver Institute. He has run and consulted on numerous campaigns in Wisconsin since the 1980s. Among others, he ran Wisconsin Governor Tommy Thompson's re-election campaign in 1990. Following Jon P. Wilcox's 1997 campaign for the Wisconsin Supreme Court, allegations of election law violations by Block were made by the Wisconsin Elections Commission. These were settled in 2001 when Block agreed to pay a $15,000 fine (though, without admitting any wrongdoing) and not to work on any campaigns until 2004.

By 2007, Block was working as the Wisconsin director of the pro-business political advocacy group Americans for Prosperity. In 1997, Block was investigated by the Wisconsin Elections Commission and agreed to a plea agreement and the payment of a $15,000 fine. In November 2012, the IRS was asked to investigate Block's Prosperity USA for spending over $40,000 of tax-exempt donations to pay for private jets, travel, and computers for Herman Cain's presidential bid. Tax-exempt charities are prohibited from intervening in the political campaign for any candidate for public office, no matter the post. CMD also asked that the IRS investigate a variety of other nonprofit groups associated with Block, including the Wisconsin Prosperity Network.

=== 2012 Herman Cain campaign ===
Block met Herman Cain while working as Wisconsin state director for Americans for Prosperity, and both were traveling to meetings in launching branches in Ohio and Michigan. At a March 2010 dinner with Cain in Las Vegas, Block and campaign aide Linda Hansen pitched a plan for how Cain could become a legitimate contender for the 2012 Republican nomination for president. Block's rising profile in the Cain campaign gained additional attention on October 24–25, 2011, when a campaign ad showing Block smoking a cigarette caused widespread consternation and amusement.

== Personal life ==
Block is married and has two children.

== See also ==
- Herman Cain presidential campaign, 2012
