= 9–9–9: An Army of Davids =

2012 book by Herman Cain and Rich Lowrie

- Author: Herman Cain
- Subject: 9–9–9 Plan
- Genre: Non-fiction
- Publisher: Mascot Books
- Publication date: May 1, 2012

9–9–9: An Army of Davids, written by Herman Cain and Rich Lowrie, was released on May 1, 2012. The book details the 9–9–9 Plan and traces its history along with Cain and other politicians' promotion of the tax policy during the 2012 United States presidential election. The text also advocates for the gold standard.

== History ==
Cain's reasoning for writing this text is based on his belief that to "get this economy going, starts with one fundamental principle—throw out the current tax code so that Obama and the politicians can't play favorites." Cain states that he used the term "An Army of Davids" because he views his opponents as big government Goliath. Cain stated that his movement "is all about empowering an army of Davids to demand that we replace our twisted tax code with the simplicity of 9–9–9, that we reform the federal regulatory morass, and that we return to a system of sound money."

The text is written by Herman Cain and Rich Lowrie, and was released on May 1, 2012. The 9–9–9 Plan, a "centerpiece" of Cain's 2012 presidential campaign, was introduced in August 2011. The 9–9–9 plan would replace all current taxes (including the payroll tax, capital gains tax, and the estate tax) with 9% business transaction tax; 9% personal income tax rate, and a 9% federal sales tax.

Cain has promoted the book on the Frank Beckmann show, Dennis Miller show, Rusty Humphries show, and the American Radio Journal, with Lowman Henry.

== Reviews ==
F. L. Anderson wrote that the text "offers fresh and unique solutions to our current economic crisis. It goes beyond the first steps—un-electing President Obama and repealing his dangerous laws and executive orders—and focuses on fundamental reforms that will make our economy soar as it did in the '80s and '90s. 9–9–9: An Army of Davids shows why the country needs Herman Cain's signature 9–9–9 tax plan and the elimination of a tax code that holds us back, robs us of our initiative, discourages jobs, and swamps our economy with imports."

Daniel Malloy, of The Atlanta Journal-Constitution, wrote that the book is a "treatise in support of the tax plan—and other policies such as increased oil drilling—and a call to action for Cain's supporters to build momentum for a flat nine percent income tax, business tax and national sales tax (with a few exemptions for the poor and businesses that operate in poor areas)."

Kenneth P. Vogel and Juana Summers of Politico wrote that "lines from the 214-page book at times echo lines in Cain's presidential speeches, showing how little the Republican's message has evolved since he left the race."

== Gold standard ==
Ralph Benko wrote in Forbes that Jack Kemp's "mantle has fallen, at least provisionally, upon Herman Cain's shoulders. Cain rises to it. Kemp, for example, was the last modern political champion of the gold standard. In 9–9–9: An Army of Davids, coauthored with his senior economic advisor Rich Lowrie, Cain devotes over a quarter of the book to passionate advocacy of the gold standard."

Charles Kadlec wrote in Forbes that "in his new book: 9–9–9: An Army of Davids, Cain, along with his Senior Economic Advisor and co-author, Rich Lowrie go beyond 9–9–9 and provide a compelling case and full elaboration on his bold plan to restore economic growth by reforming the tax system, the regulatory state, and the monetary system. The combination of these reforms, in the words of the authors, would 'fundamentally transform Washington'." The case for 9–9–9 and regulatory reform are fairly well known. Where Cain breaks new ground is his call for a '21st Century Gold Standard.'"

Robert Wenzel, editor of the Economic Policy Journal, wrote that "it is noteworthy that a former Fed branch chairman is now advocating a gold standard."

== See also ==
- Tax reform
