= Rosalind Howells, Baroness Howells of St Davids =

British politician (1931–2025)

The Right Honourable The Baroness Howells of St Davids OBE COG
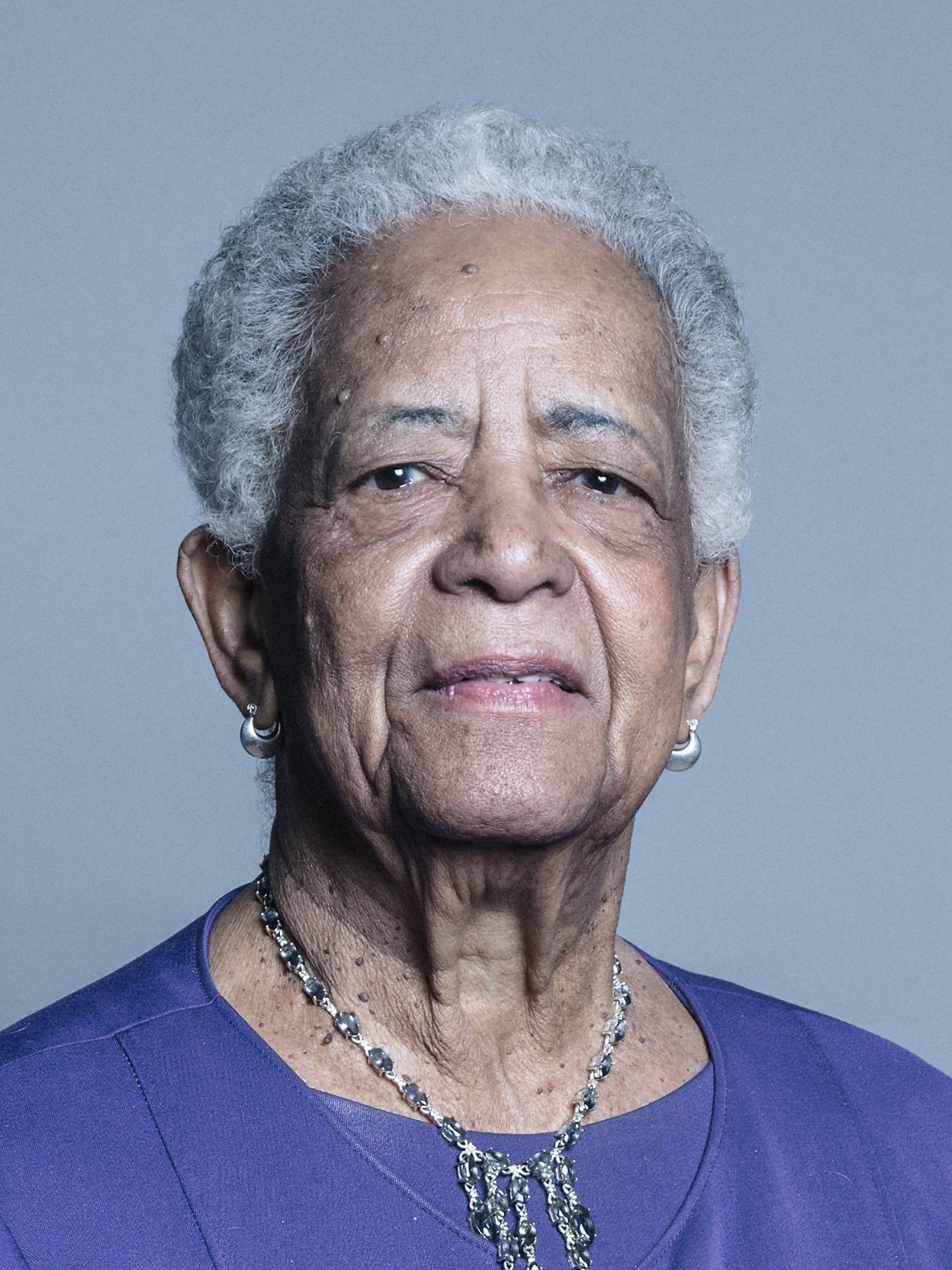

Member of the House of Lords
- Lord Temporal
- Life peerage 21 July 1999 – 10 January 2019

Chancellor of the University of Bedfordshire
- In office 2009–2014
- Vice Chancellor: Les Ebdon; Bill Rammell
- Preceded by: Sir Robin Biggam
- Succeeded by: John Bercow

Personal details
- Born: Rosalind Patricia-Anne George; 10 January 1931 St Davids, Grenada, British Windward Islands
- Died: 14 October 2025 (aged 94)
- Party: Labour
- Spouse: John Charles Howells (m. 1955; died 2004)
- Children: 2
- Education: St Joseph's College, Reading; South West London College
- Alma mater: University of the District of Columbia

Rosalind Patricia-Anne Howells, Baroness Howells of St Davids, OBE, COG (née George; 10 January 1931 – 14 October 2025) was a British Labour politician, who served as member of the House of Lords from 1999 to 2019.

Having been appointed an Officer of the Order of the British Empire (OBE) in the 1994 New Year Honours for voluntary services, she was made a life peer as Baroness Howells of St Davids, of Charlton in the London Borough of Greenwich on 21 July 1999. The name St Davids refers to the parish in Grenada where she was brought up, to the south-east of the island. She retired from the House of Lords on 10 January 2019.

Howells was appointed a Companion of the Order of Grenada (COG) in 2009.

== Early life ==
Born in Grenada on 10 January 1931, she moved to Britain at the age of 20, "joining the early wave of Caribbean migrants who would go on to shape the nation's social and cultural fabric", in the words of political commentator Patrick Vernon.

Howells was educated at St Joseph's College in Grenada, at South West London College, and at the University of the District of Columbia in Washington, D.C.

== Career ==
Howells served as the Director of the Greenwich Racial Equality Council, as well as a Community and Equal Opportunities Worker. She was a trustee of the Stephen Lawrence Charitable Trust, and served as the unofficial advisor to the Lawrence family.

Howells was the first black woman to sit on the Greater London Council's Training Board; the first female member of the Court of Governors of the University of Greenwich and was the Vice Chair at the London Voluntary Service Council. She worked with the Carnival Liaison Committee, Greater London Action in Race Equality, and was an active campaigner for justice in the field of race relations. She was a trustee of the Jason Roberts Foundation, which aims to provide a range of sporting opportunities for children and young people in the United Kingdom and Grenada.

In March 2009, she was inaugurated as the Chancellor of the University of Bedfordshire in Luton. Howells was a trustee of St George's University's UK Trust and served on the board of the Windward Islands Research and Education Foundation (WINDREF), the research institute affiliated with St. George's University.

== Personal life and death ==
Howells was the younger sister of Dame Hilda Bynoe, who served as the first female viceregal representative in the history of the Commonwealth as Governor of Grenada from 1968 until 1974.

In 1955, she married John Charles Howells, and they had two daughters. He died in 2004.

Howells died on 14 October 2025, at the age of 94.

Academic offices
| Preceded by Sir Robin Biggam | Chancellor of the University of Bedfordshire; 2009–2014 | Succeeded by John Bercow |
