= Herman Cain 2012 presidential campaign =

American political campaign

Friends of Herman Cain
- Campaign: U.S. presidential election, 2012
- Candidate: Herman Cain of Georgia; Businessman; Radio talk-show host Former Chairman of the Federal Reserve Bank of Kansas City
- Affiliation: Republican Party
- Status: Inactive
- Announced: May 21, 2011
- Suspended: December 3, 2011
- Headquarters: Stockbridge, Georgia
- Key people: Mark Block (chief of staff); Dan Tripp (national field director); Jeffrey D. Gordon (vice president for communications); Rich Lowrie, Charles Kadlec (economic advisers); C. Everett Koop (health issues adviser)
- Receipts: US$16,838,802 (2012-06-30)
- Slogan: Let's Get Real
- Theme song: I Am America by Krista Branch (video)

Website
- HermanCain.com (archived - November 27, 2011)

The 2012 presidential campaign of Herman Cain, an American businessman and radio host, began shortly after the 2010 midterm elections. He ran for the 2012 Republican Party nomination for President of the United States.

Although he was frequently mentioned as a possible candidate, Cain stopped short of a full-fledged candidacy before the beginning of 2011. Although he was characterized as a Washington outsider, as of October 19, 2011, polls showed him to be one of the front runners in the Republican primaries.

Cain spent a considerable amount of time campaigning throughout the early primary states (particularly Iowa and New Hampshire) for most of 2010. Nearly two weeks after the beginning of the year, Cain filed his organization with the Federal Election Commission as an exploratory committee, under the name Friends of Herman Cain. Cain was a supporter of the Tea Party movement. He was in favor of the gold standard.

Cain ran as a Washington outsider and became a front-runner in the race in the fall of 2011. However, Cain's support plummeted after several women alleged that he had engaged in sexual harassment or, in one case, a 13-year extramarital affair. Cain and his wife unequivocally said the accusations were false, but Cain, citing the toll the allegations had taken on his family and his political support, suspended his campaign on December 3, 2011.

== The campaign ==
=== Exploratory committee ===
Following the 2010 midterm elections, Cain announced his intentions to run for president in December 2010, stating that there is a 70% chance that he would attempt to seek the office. Following the New Year, Cain announced on January 12, 2011, in an interview with CNN that he had officially formed an exploratory committee. On the Fox Business program Your World with Neil Cavuto, Cain did an exclusive interview with Neil Cavuto, expanding on the announcement.

=== Official announcement ===
Cain formally announced his candidacy on May 21, 2011, in Centennial Olympic Park in Atlanta, Georgia, to a crowd of 15,000 cheering supporters.

=== Campaign progress ===
==== Dark horse ====
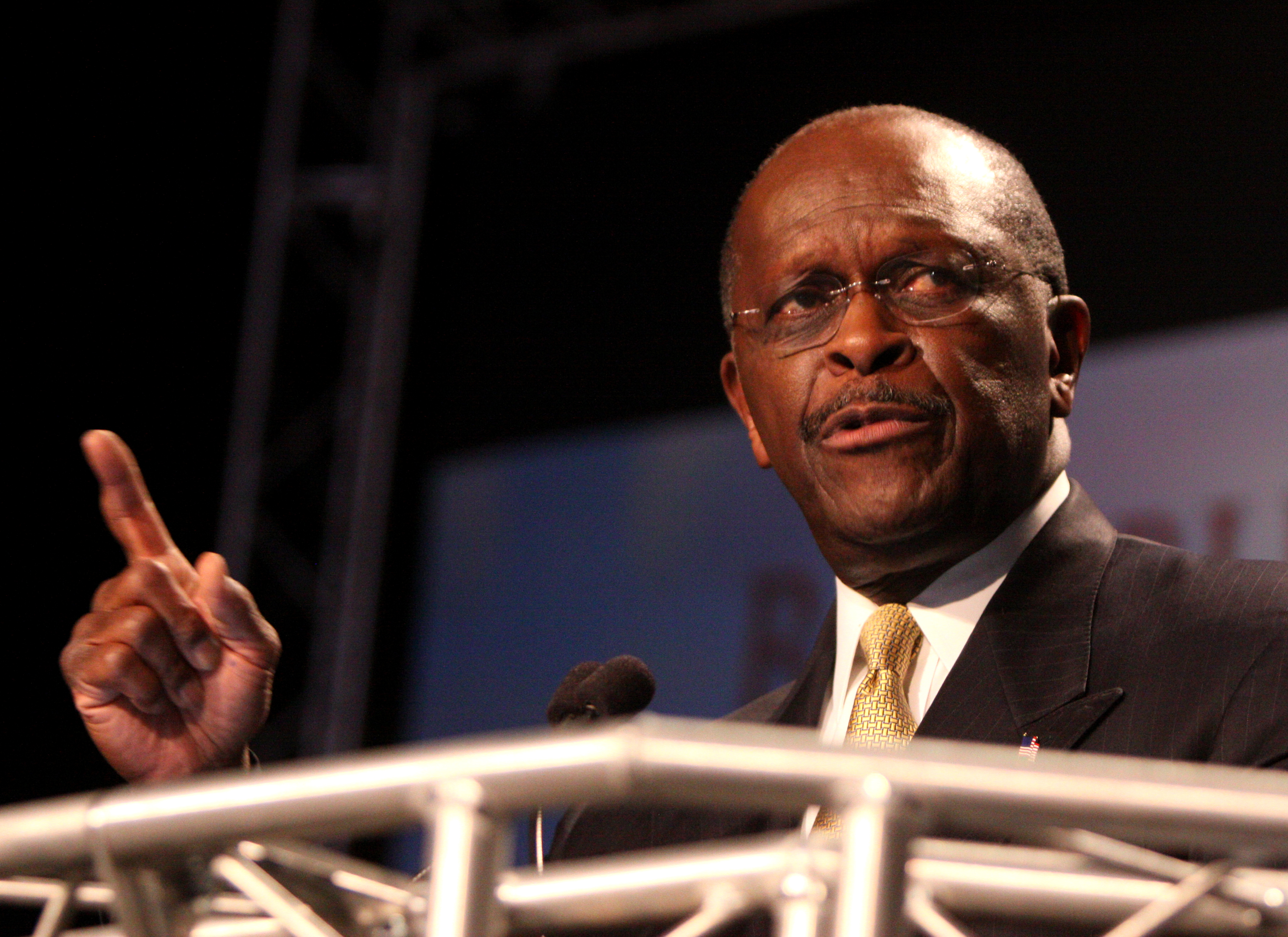
Cain speaking at the Ames Straw Poll in August 2011

A January 2011 analysis of the Republican presidential field in Sabato's Crystal Ball placed Cain in the fourth tier of candidates, saying he was "a favorite among some activists [... with] a blunt, no-holds-barred style", but that he was limited by having had no elective experience and by "the perception that he is too far right to win a general election". The same month, Cain finished seventh out of twenty-one candidates in the New Hampshire Straw Poll, gaining four percent of the vote of a group of state Republican Party members. At this stage, Cain referred to himself as a "dark horse" when asked about a possible campaign. In February 2011, the Tea Party Patriots organized and hosted the American Policy Summit in Phoenix, Arizona. The 1,600 attendees were polled regarding their preference for a 2012 presidential candidate. Cain won the poll with 22%. Runners up were Tim Pawlenty (16%), Ron Paul (15%), and Sarah Palin (10%).

==== Building momentum ====
On May 5, 2011, Fox News presented a presidential campaign debate. Cain was one of five potential candidates who participated. (The others were Tim Pawlenty, Ron Paul, Gary Johnson and Rick Santorum as the higher-profile candidates declined Fox's invitation.) Cain was declared the overwhelming winner by pollster Frank Luntz after a show of hands among 29 debate witnesses who were chosen by Fox to act as a post-performance focus group.

On June 3, 2011, an Insider-Advantage poll showed Cain leading the field of Republican primary candidates among Georgia Republicans. A July 2011 Zogby poll showed Cain in second place nationally, with 18% of the vote, behind Michele Bachmann and ahead of Romney.

Cain finished fifth in the Iowa Straw Poll on August 13, 2011, with 8.6% of the vote. Cain said he was satisfied with the result, writing in an email to supporters, "I have said from the beginning that I would not buy a straw poll victory. We worked hard. We organized. We turned our supporters out to the Straw Poll. While I did not place 1st, 2nd, or 3rd, I am happy with our strong placing. I spent less money, had less name ID than the front runners, but our strong showing is evidence of the deep support for a non-politician problem solver who has the courage and conviction to change the way things work in Washington. I beat better known, better funded politicians...including those who have held titles like Governor and Speaker of the House."

==== Top-tier ====
As a follow-up to a September 22, 2011, debate performance in Orlando, Florida, Cain won the September 24 Florida GOP Presidency 5 Straw Poll with 37% of the votes cast by Republican party activists in attendance; Cain's nearest competitor was Rick Perry, who garnered the support of 15% of attendees at the event. A national interactive opinion survey released in September 2011 by IBOPE Zogby International showed Cain with a ten-point lead against the nearest competitor, Rick Perry, among likely 2012 Republican primary voters. "A new Rasmussen Reports national telephone survey of Likely U.S. Voters finds that Obama earns 39% support while Cain attracts 34%". Rassmussen went on to say, "In a match-up against President Obama, just 61% of Republicans are ready to vote for Cain. Eighteen percent (18%) would prefer a third option and 11% are not sure. Among unaffiliated voters, 33% prefer Cain, 31% Obama, and 36% aren't ready to commit to either candidate."

==== Front-runner ====
On September 24, 2011, Cain won a surprise victory in a Republican presidential straw poll in Florida, with 37 percent of the 2,657 votes cast. The front-runner Rick Perry, who had been leading in the polls, came in second with 15 percent. Continuing with his success, on October 1, 2011, Cain won the TeaCon Midwest straw poll by a landslide with 77% of the vote. Cain also won the National Federation of Republican Women straw poll by a wide margin with 48.9%. The nearest contender was Rick Perry with 14.1%, followed closely by Mitt Romney with 13.3% and Newt Gingrich with 12.5%. Of the delegates voting, 80% said they were satisfied with the field of candidates; asked whether they identified with the Tea Party, about half said yes and half said no. A Fox News poll administered on October 23–25, showed Cain as the front-runner receiving 24%, and Mitt Romney coming in at second place with 20%.

==== Loss of momentum ====
Cain's polling numbers declined in November 2011 amidst allegations of past sexual misconduct with female employees. Doubts about Cain as a potential commander-in-chief also increased following a videotaped interview with the Milwaukee Journal Sentinel editorial board, in which Cain appeared to be unacquainted with U.S. policy toward Libya. In mid-November, a poll by The Washington Post and ABC showed a 19% increase in Republicans who hold a negative impression of Cain. A national poll conducted by CNN and ORC International showed Cain falling 11% among Republicans and Republican-leaning independents, as compared to the previous month. This poll put Romney at 24%, Gingrich at 22% and Cain at 14%.

==== Campaign suspension ====
Cain suspended his campaign on December 3, 2011, though briefly revived it in conjunction with Stephen Colbert's satirical presidential campaign, when the comedian discovered there were no write-ins permitted in the South Carolina primary, and he needed a substitute. Cain received over six thousand votes and then endorsed Newt Gingrich before the Florida primary. During his resignation speech, he was quoted as saying "Life can be a challenge. Life can seem impossible, it's never easy when there's so much on the line. But you and I can make a difference. There's a mission just for you and me. Just look inside and you will find just what you can do", which turned out to be a quote from the Donna Summer song "The Power of One" from the 2000 film Pokémon: The Movie 2000.

=== Controversies ===
==== Legality of campaign funding ====
On October 30, 2011, allegations surfaced that the Cain campaign may have been illegally funded by Mark Block's Prosperity USA. As a tax-exempt charity, Prosperity USA is not allowed to donate money or services to a political campaign.

Prosperity USA was funded through Americans for Prosperity (AFP), which has previously employed both Cain and Block.

On October 31, 2011, Block denied that the Koch family had funded the Cain campaign.

==== Sexual harassment allegations ====
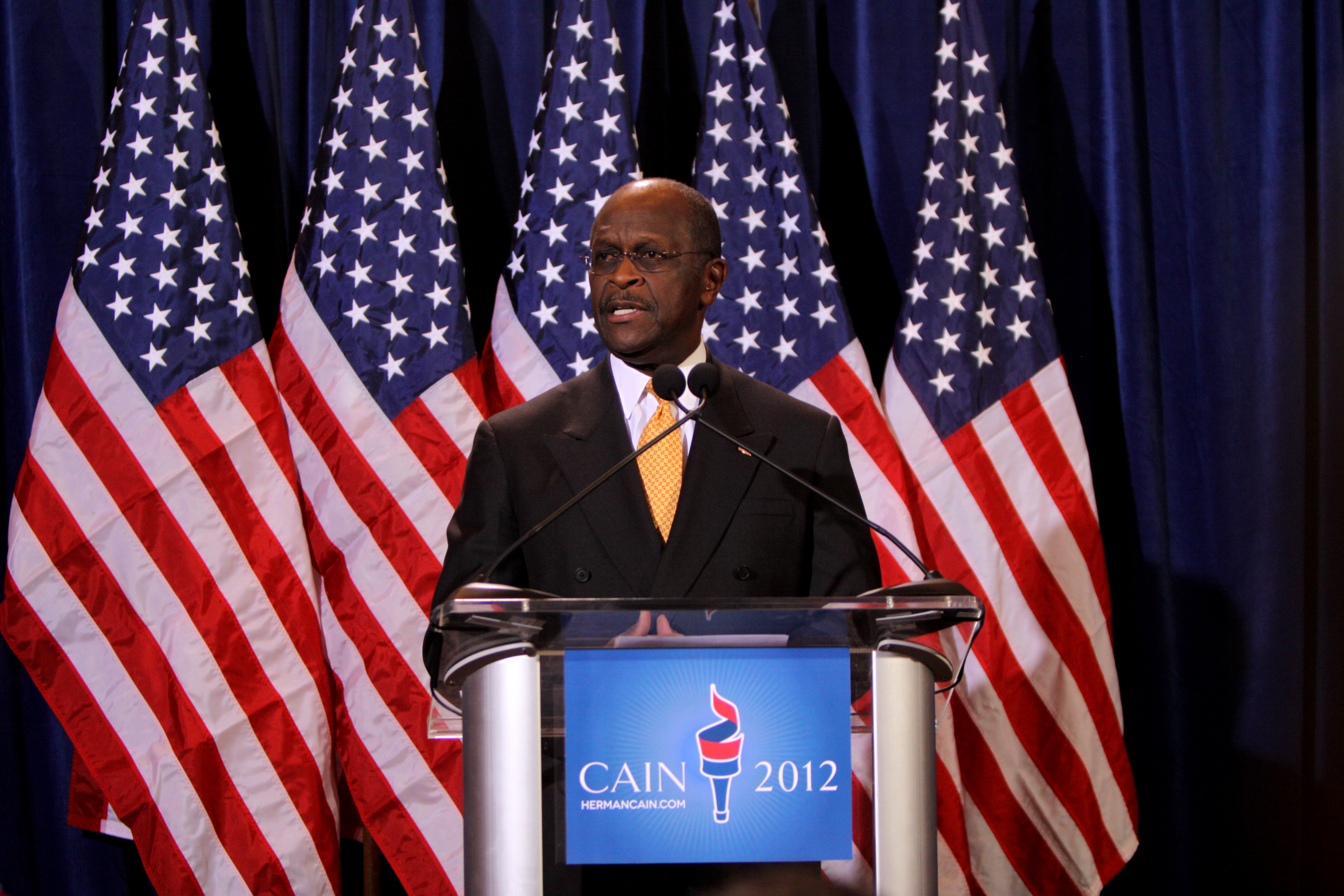
Cain at a press conference in Scottsdale, Arizona, addressing accusations of sexual harassment

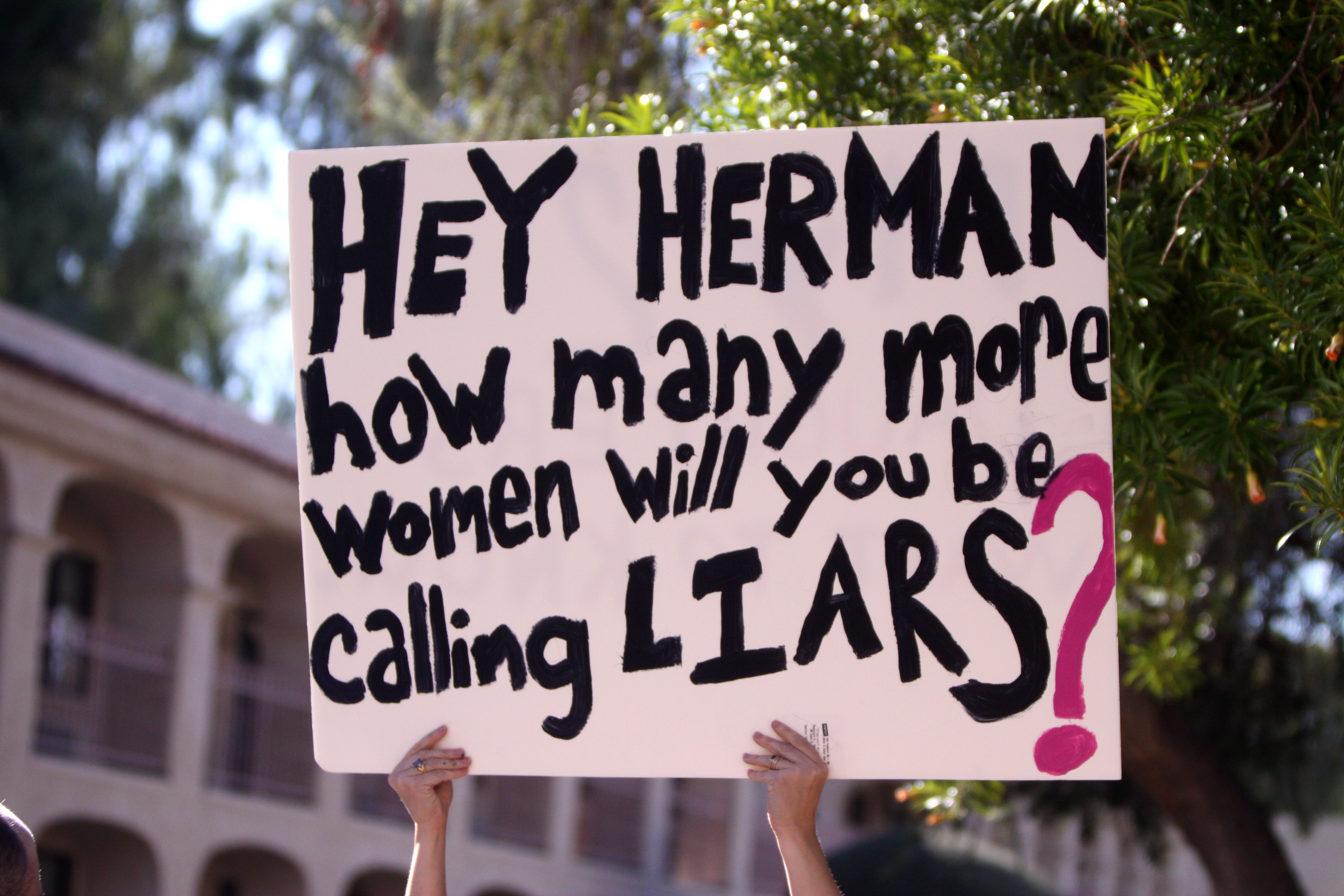
Protester holding sign commenting on the accusations against Cain

In October 2011, Politico reported that two female employees had complained about inappropriate behavior by Cain during his tenure at the National Restaurant Association. The women reportedly accepted financial settlements from the association which barred them from discussing their allegations further. Cain's campaign initially refused comment, but subsequently acknowledged that the accusations had been made. Cain strongly denied any impropriety, stating: "I have never sexually harassed anyone and those accusations are totally false." He initially denied being aware of any financial settlement with the accusers, but later accepted that some form of payment had been made by the Restaurant Association. He described the allegations as a "witch hunt".

The Cain campaign hired attorney L. Lin Wood to head a team responding to the allegations. Wood warned that any other women coming forward with allegations would face intense scrutiny and might also be subject to legal action, but said he did not intend to scare anyone away from doing so.

On November 3, 2011, it was reported that a third woman had stated that Cain had commented on her attractiveness and invited her up to his corporate apartment.

On November 8, 2011, one of the first two women to accuse Cain was identified as Karen Kraushaar, currently employed at the US Treasury Department. According to Cain, one of the specific allegations was making a gesture indicating his wife's height by holding his palm flat, which one of the accusers found objectionable. Joel Bennett, the lawyer representing Kraushaar, called Cain's version of events "goofy", stating that his "client would never have filed a complaint of sexual harassment on the basis that she was the same height as his wife. It is ridiculous." Bennett would not describe the complaint, but said he might in the future. In an interview with Greta van Susteren, Cain further said that the allegations had been investigated and found baseless. Two days later Cain recalled the incident, claiming not to know what or how much may have been paid. One of the women had been paid a year's salary and the other a lesser amount.

According to The New York Times and Bloomberg News, at a November 7, 2011, press conference, a fourth woman, registered Republican Sharon Bialek, made allegations of a sexual assault in Cain's car in the summer of 1997. At the time, Bialek had recently lost her job at the National Restaurant Association where she had been a subordinate of Cain's, and she was asking him for assistance in either getting her job back or finding a new job. She alleged that, following a dinner meeting to discuss her job search, Cain reached under the skirt of her suit for her genitals and pushed her head toward his crotch. When she questioned his behavior, Bialek said that Cain replied, "You want a job, right?" Bialek has sought legal assistance from lawyer Gloria Allred. At the press conference, Allred showed what she said were two affidavits from people testifying that Bialek had told them of the incident at the time. The affidavits were not released to the press. Cain's campaign team promptly denied the accusations, claiming them to be "completely false", and repeating that he "never harassed anyone".

At a press conference on November 8, 2011, Cain said of Bialek, "I don't even know who this lady is." But at the November 7, 2011, press conference, Bialek said that she had a recent encounter with Cain, on October 1, 2011, at a Tea Party event, and that Cain had said he remembered her, and they talked. Amy Jacobson, a Chicago radio talk show host, corroborated Bialek's story about the October 1 meeting to the Chicago Sun-Times: "She talked to him for a few minutes, which made me kind of mad because I wanted to talk to him". Jacobson said that Cain appeared "stone-faced" after smiling at first. On November 14, 2011, Bialek's former boyfriend, Dr. Victor Zuckerman, a registered Republican, held a press conference in which he corroborated Bialek's version of what happened in 1997: "When she returned [from Chicago], she was upset. She said something had happened and that Mr. Cain had touched her in an inappropriate manner." Zuckerman also said that when he first learned of the allegations on October 30, he called Bialek to ask if she was involved. She said "no" but was livid about Cain's denials.

On November 28, 2011, Cain announced that a fifth woman, Ginger White, 46, would be claiming to have had a thirteen-year affair with him and that the allegation was not true. An interview with White was aired an hour later on Fox 5 in Atlanta. In the interview, White said the affair lasted 13 years and ended right before Cain announced his presidential campaign. On November 30, 2011, Cain denounced allegations of sexual harassment and adultery as "character assassination" during an event in Dayton, Ohio.

On November 25, 2013, Cain decided to write the details of his defense, specifically referring to the timeline of Ginger White's actions. He said of his reason for doing so then, "Until now, I have never offered the facts that expose these accusations as lies, although I have been in possession of them ... It is now time to do so, not only because the false accusations have received renewed attention with the publication of a book that discusses them, but more importantly because I refuse to live my life, pursue my radio and professional career or do anything else that God has left for me to do in this world with a dark cloud attached to my reputation that is not consistent with the truth."

== Political positions ==
=== Economic issues ===
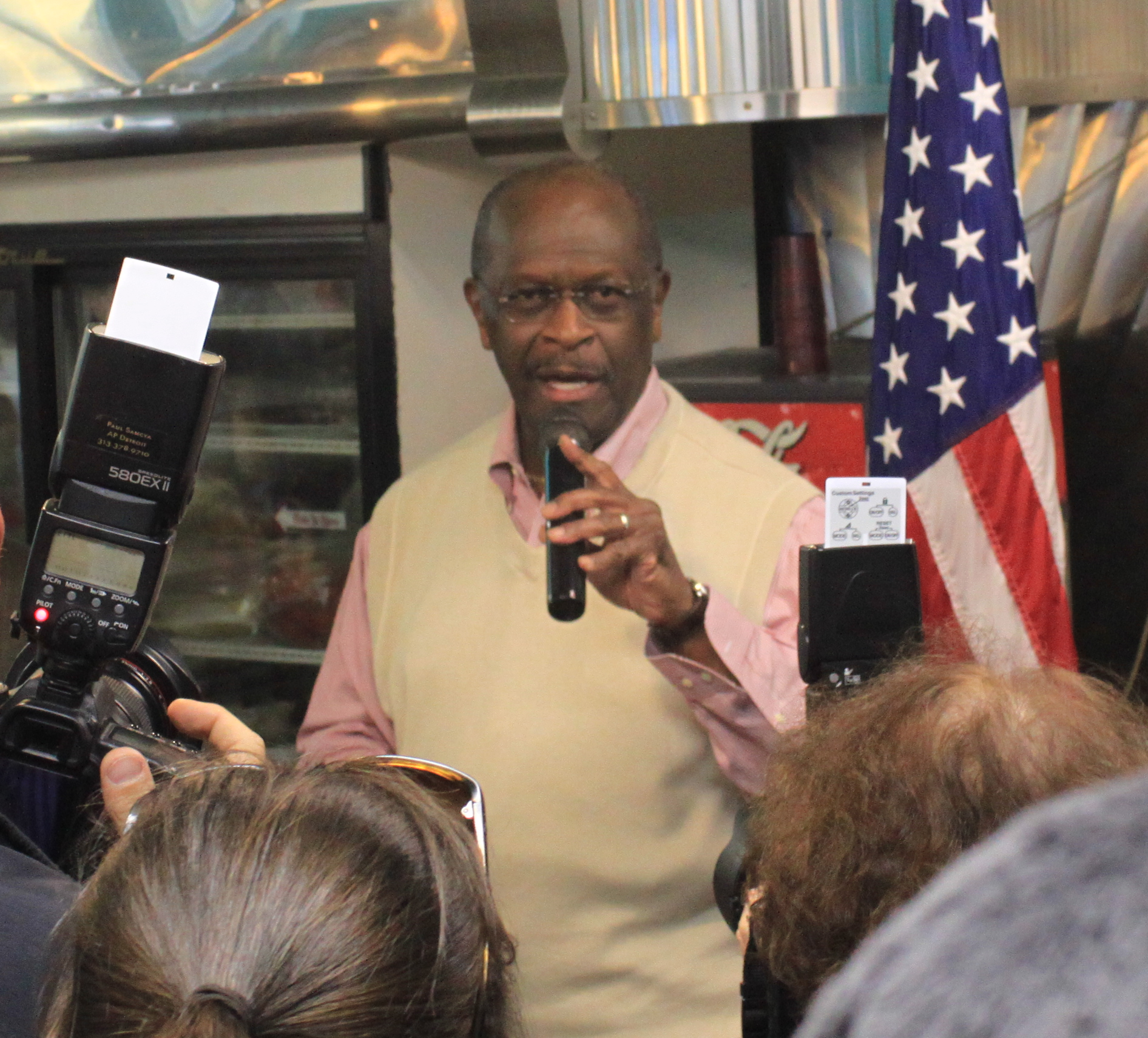
Herman Cain explains his economic plan to supporters at a campaign event at a diner in Ypsilanti, Michigan, November 10, 2011.

The centerpiece of Cain's 2012 presidential campaign was the 9–9–9 Plan, replacing most current federal taxes with a 9% tax on business transactions, personal income and sales. Cain would eliminate the payroll tax, capital gains tax, and the estate tax. The federal tax deduction for charitable contributions would have remained in effect, but all other federal tax deductions would be repealed. Purchases of used goods would be exempt from the federal sales tax. Federal excise taxes on cigarettes, beer, and gasoline would remain in effect. Grover Norquist has questioned Cain's plan on the basis of adding a federal sales tax will allow for future increases in it. Cain's "lead economist" Rich Lowrie has claimed that Cain's plan would collect $2.3 trillion in taxes while less than $2.2 trillion was gathered under the current system.

According to the nonpartisan research group Tax Policy Center, 84% of U.S. households would pay more than they do under current tax policies, while "the majority of the highest income households would get a tax cut". Economist Paul Krugman has criticized its tax on business transactions as a tax on wages and salaries. However conservatives Arthur Laffer, Lawrence Kudlow, the Club for Growth, and Congressman Paul Ryan have spoken favorably of the plan. The former Reagan Treasury official Gary Robbins stated that the 9–9–9 Plan will expand the GDP by $2 trillion, create 6 million new jobs, increase business investment by 33%, and increase wages by 10%.

Cain supported lowering the corporate tax rates from 35 to 25 percent, eliminating the capital gains tax, and suspending taxes on repatriated foreign profits. He also supported elimination of the estate tax. He was a strong supporter of the FairTax, which would have replaced all federal personal and corporate income taxes with a 23% national sales tax on all new goods and services, with a "prebate" to untax goods and services deemed necessary by the Department of Health and Human Services. As a transition toward this plan, he supported imposition of a national retail sales tax under HR 2525.

Cain opposed any increase in the debt limit for the federal government in 2011, dismissing calls for an increase based on "exaggerated scare tactics". Cain maintained support for the Troubled Asset Relief Program (TARP) bank bailouts of 2008 "without regrets", though criticizing the "picking of winners and losers" in its implementation. Cain criticized welfare, stating that, "Programs today are designed to make people more dependent rather than less dependent. "

Cain strongly criticized the present system of Social Security, describing it as a "scam". He favors reforming the current system "through free market solutions". He supports the Chilean model for younger citizens while retaining the current system for current beneficiaries.

Cain favored return to the gold standard, saying that abandoning it "allowed Congress to inflate our currency whenever they overspent". He said there was no need for an audit of the Federal Reserve, though he did not object to it, because he trusted the bank's internal controls.

=== Foreign policy ===
Cain supported the war in Afghanistan and the war in Iraq, opposing a timetable for withdrawal as equivalent to surrender.

He said that the U.S. should aid Israel in defending itself, and has said, "If you mess with Israel, you're messing with the USA." He was the only Republican presidential candidate at former Fox News host Glenn Beck's Restoring Courage rally in Israel.

He expressed "shock" at President Obama's acceptance of Palestine's 1967 borders as a starting point of peace negotiations, saying he "threw Israel under the bus" Cain supports the Palestinian right of return under Israeli conditions, though media criticized his apparent unfamiliarity with the issue, though he later admitted that "I didn't understand the right of return".

Cain opposed any negotiation with North Korea, and has argued for maintaining "peace through strength", and opposed the New START treaty because he believed that the U.S. should retain freedom to develop nuclear weapons systems.

On Iran, Cain expressed support for a wary but "diplomatic approach" to nuclear disarmament in an October 2010 interview. In a subsequent interview with Fox News contributor KT McFarland, he said he thinks that only military action could stop the Iranian nuclear program, but that he would "have to talk to a lot of people" before he would consider that step. In an interview with the Milwaukee Journal-Sentinel, he stated that a first strike on Iran "is not a practical, top-tier alternative... look at the topography of Iran. Where are you going to strike? It's very mountainous. That's what makes it very difficult."

In an October 8, 2011, interview with Christian Broadcasting Network's (CBN) David Brody, Cain was asked about the raised level of scrutiny received by presidential candidates and how he would answer a "gotcha" question "like who's the president of Uzbekistan?" Cain responded, "When they ask me who's the president of Ubeki-beki-beki-beki-stan-stan, I'm going to say, 'You know, I don't know. Do you know?' And then I'm going to say, 'How's that going to create one job?' He further characterized Uzbekistan as one of the "small insignificant states around the world" and stated, "I don't think that is something that is critical to focusing on national security." Cain was later criticized for his seeming ignorance and mocking of a country that both presidents Bush and Obama have sought to use as a supply base in the Afghan war.

In an October 31, 2011, interview on PBS NewsHour, in response to a question from Judy Woodruff, Cain said of China "Yes, they're a military threat. They've indicated that they're trying to develop nuclear capability," suggesting that he was ignorant of China's current presence as a nuclear weapon state, having had nuclear weapons since 1964. When later interviewed by Virginia Lamp Thomas, Cain clarified his position by saying "What I meant was China does not have the size of nuclear capability that we have."

On November 14, 2011, the Milwaukee Journal Sentinel reported that Cain "stumbled badly" in an interview with the paper's editors when he was unable to recall exactly why he disagreed with Obama's handling of the Libyan crisis. His campaign explained that the problem was that Cain had had only four hours' sleep on the previous night. Cain later said that the Taliban and Al-Qaeda would potentially be part of the new Libyan government.

=== Education ===
Cain opposed 'No Child Left Behind' and favors state control of education. He has argued for greater performance-related pay for teachers, as well as for vouchers and charter school systems.

=== Global warming ===
In interviews he dismissed anthropogenic global warming as "poppycock", and opposed subsidies for wind power and solar power while favoring oil drilling offshore and in ANWR. Cain went on to say that "global warming" was not real but that "climate change" was and science has shown it not to be a crisis.

=== Health care ===
Cain favored allowing the free market to play the largest role in health care and strongly supported the 2011 Ryan budget plan's "voucher program" to privatize Medicare.

=== Immigration ===
Cain believed illegal immigrants should be able to go through the traditional citizenship process, but opposed what he has described as a sense of automatic "entitlement".

On October 15, 2011, Cain proposed to build an electrified fence on the Mexico–United States border that could kill people trying to enter the country illegally. Cain said: "It's going to be 20 feet high. It's going to have barbed wire on the top. It's going to be electrified. And there's going to be a sign on the other side saying, 'It will kill you—Warning'." At another campaign rally he added that the sign would be written in English and in Spanish. However, Cain stated his comments on an electrified border fence were just a "joke", telling CNN's John King, "Yeah, it was a joke, and yeah, I haven't learned how to be politically correct yet." In a following interview, Cain expressed that he was serious about the border fence and stated "I'm not walking away from that".

=== Energy and the environment ===
Cain favored offshore drilling and supported drilling in the Arctic National Wildlife Refuge (ANWR). He opposed providing funding and incentives by the government to particular corporations and industries for alternative energy sources such as solar and wind.

He made statements indicating a belief that anthropogenic global warming is a hoax, referring to it as "poppycock" and claimed that scientists were "busted" of having "manipulated the data".

=== Occupy Wall Street ===
In October 2011, he described the Occupy Wall Street movement as "un-American". He further stated, "I don't have facts to back this up, but I happen to believe that these demonstrations are planned and orchestrated to distract from the failed policies of the Obama administration. Don't blame Wall Street, don't blame the big banks, if you don't have a job and you're not rich, blame yourself."

=== Social issues ===
==== Islam and American Muslims ====
A number of comments made by Cain regarding his attitudes toward Muslims have caused controversy, such as two cases in which he expressed his distrust of the doctors treating his cancer when he believed them to be Muslim, including one who had a "too foreign name", and his relief upon discovery that the doctor was a Christian. He described his discomfort with a specific Muslim doctor as based on his knowledge of the religion which included an understanding that Muslims have "an objective to convert all infidels or kill them". He has said he would not be comfortable appointing any Muslim to his administration or the judiciary. He criticized a court case – overturned on appeal – in which a judge used a husband's Muslim religious beliefs as a basis for not granting the man's wife a restraining order against him, and has argued in favor of allowing communities to ban the construction of mosques, expressing concerns about "people who might be terrorists".

==== Affirmative action ====
Herman Cain supports ensuring that minorities receive the same opportunities as non-minorities, but not a "quota" style affirmative action system that would give an advantage to minorities.

==== Abortion ====
Cain's position on abortion has been the subject of some controversy. In interviews with Piers Morgan and John Stossel, Cain stated that he was "pro-life from conception", that it was not the government's role to make decisions about abortion, and in the interview with Stossel that "abortion should not be legal". His seemingly contradictory statements alarmed anti-abortion activists and other social conservatives, who accused Cain of echoing pro-choice reasoning and questioned his dedication to outlawing abortion. Cain sought to address these concerns by emphasizing his commitment to outlawing abortion and to de-funding Planned Parenthood. He argued that some of his comments had been taken out of context and described himself as "100% pro-life. End of story." The Washington Post described Cain's positions on abortion as inconsistent, but noted that his initial position "actually sounds vaguely pro-choice".

==== Same-sex marriage ====
Cain opposed legalizing same-sex marriage. He supported the Defense of Marriage Act and would have supported a federal ban on gay marriage.

== Media coverage and reactions ==
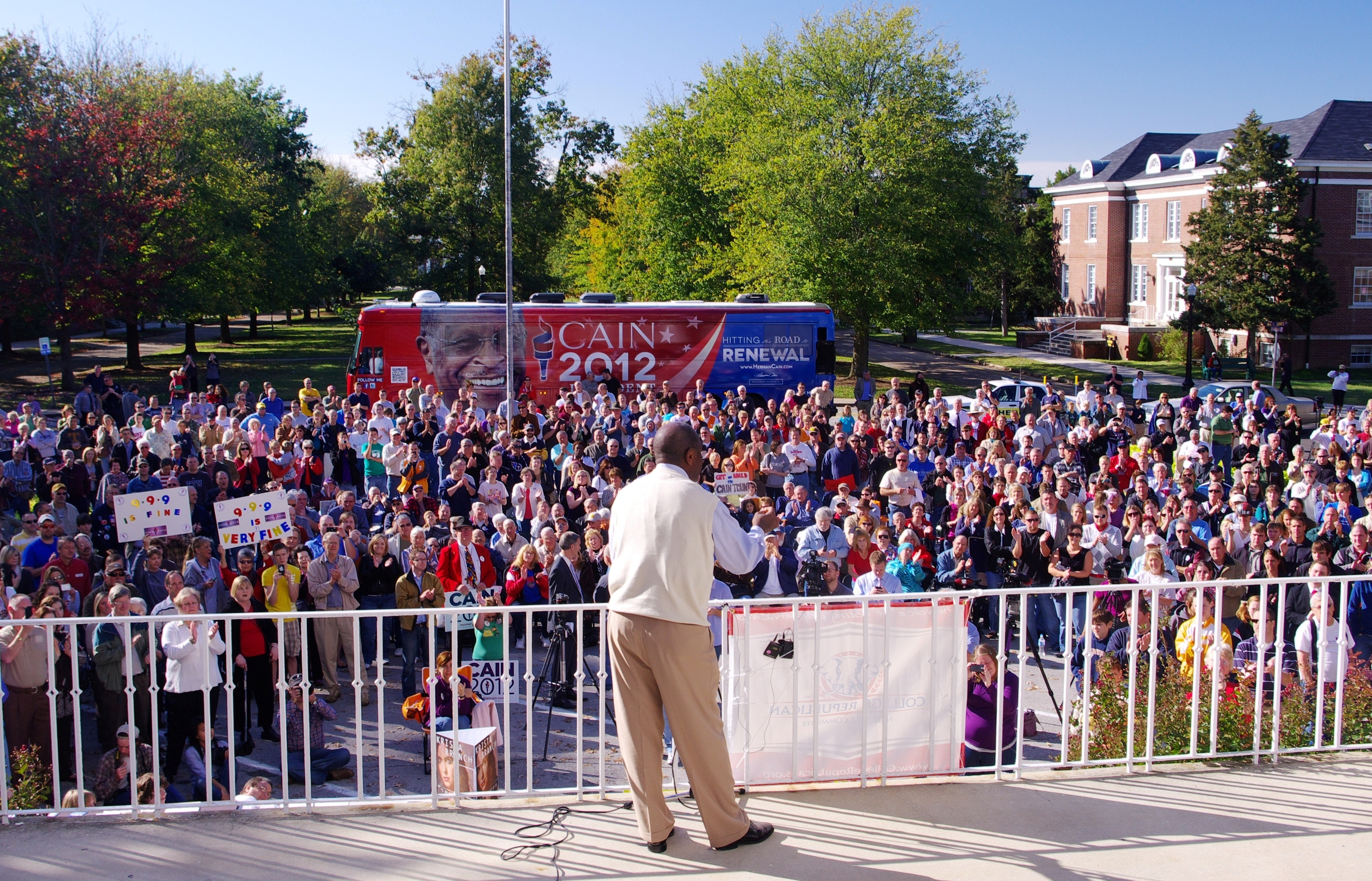
Cain campaigning in Tennessee

Cain's statements regarding Muslims led to criticisms of "bigotry" and "Muslim bashing" from CAIR, whose spokesperson stated "It would be laughable if it weren't having such a negative impact on the lives of Muslim Americans". He was criticized for this remark by conservatives at Grover Norquist's weekly Wednesday Gatherings, one of whom called the remark "frightening".

In an interview with Bloomberg view, Cain argued that he is a "black American" rather than an "African American" since he is able to trace his ancestors within the U.S., describing Barack Obama as "more of an international ... look, he was raised in Kenya, his mother was white from Kansas and her family had an influence on him, it's true, but his dad was Kenyan". Interviewer Jeffrey Goldberg pointed out that Obama had spent 4 years of his childhood abroad, and that it was in Indonesia – not Kenya, at which point Cain revised his claim.

Cain faced criticism regarding his lack of foreign policy experience and stumbled early in the campaign when answering a question regarding the Palestinian right of return as he appeared unfamiliar with the issue and staff were forced to later clarify his position.

As news organizations began to reconsider Cain as a viable candidate, speculation grew regarding his true motivations. MSNBC found that Cain was spending more time on a book tour than in Iowa, predicting that he was more interested in raising his public image than winning the presidency. The New York Times added that Cain worked professionally as a public keynote speaker, and was earning $25,000 a speech during the campaign.

When news came to light that Rick Perry's hunting ranch formerly had the racially insensitive name "Niggerhead", Cain stated to the press "For him to leave it there as long as he did before, I hear, they finally painted over it, is just insensitive to a lot of people in this country." The next day he would go on to say "I really don't care about that word. They painted over it. End of story."

The character of Herbert Love, who appeared in the 2013 fourth season of the sitcom Arrested Development, was based on Cain. Played by Terry Crews, Herbert Love was a black conservative candidate for a California U.S. Senate seat. Love proposed low taxes for high-income earners and was depicted as greedy and corrupt. Cain replied that "I heard about it, haven't seen it, and I'm unfazed by it. In the vernacular of my grandfather, 'I does not care.'"

== Campaign staff ==
- Mark Block – Chief of Staff (From Americans for Prosperity (AFP))
- Linda Hansen – Deputy Chief of Staff
- Scott Bieniek – Vice President and General Counsel (From Family PAC.)
- Ellen Carmichael – Communications Director
- Edward Miyagishima – Vice President of Campaign Operations
- Richard Norman – Vice President of Development (of the fundraising Richard Norman Company of Virginia.)
- Michelle Gwaltney – Vice President of Operations
- J.D. Gordon – Vice President of Communications and Chief Foreign Policy Adviser

== Endorsements ==
List of Herman Cain endorsements

Elected officials

- Larry Ahern (politician), State Representative (R-FL)
- J. Michael Ball, State Representative (R-NH)
- Dan Benishek, U.S. Congressman (R-MI)
- Charles Brosseau, State Representative (R-NH)
- Sam Cataldo, State Representative (R-NH)
- William Condra, State Representative (R-NH)
- Joe Hune, State Senator (R-MI)
- Rusty Kidd, State Representative (I-GA)
- Billy Maddox, State Representative (R-GA)
- Joshua McKoon, State Senator (R-GA)
- William Panek, State Representative (R-NH)
- Scott Plakon, State Representative (R-FL)
- Kevin Reichard, State Representative (R-NH)
- Steven Smith, State Representative (R-NH)
- Tom Tancredo, former U.S. Congressman (R-CO), 2008 presidential candidate, and 2010 Colorado gubernatorial candidate
- Joseph Thomas, State Representative (R-NH)
- Carlos Trujillo, State Representative (R-FL)
- Renee Unterman, State Senator (R-GA)

Others

- Americans for Fair Taxation
- Christopher R. Barron, member of the board of directors and co-founder of GOProud
- Niger Innis, Civil rights activist
- Peter S. Kalikow, former chairman of the New York City Metropolitan Transportation Authority
- Jack Kimball, former chairman of the New Hampshire Republican Party and 2010 New Hampshire gubernatorial candidate
- Dean Kleckner, former president of the American Farm Bureau
- Dennis Miller, Comedian and talk radio host (withdrew support)
- Dale Peterson, 2010 Republican candidate for Alabama Agriculture Commissioner
- Nick Searcy, actor
- Michael D. Steele, retired U.S. Army Colonel

== See also ==
- This is Herman Cain!: My Journey to the White House
