= Krista Branch =

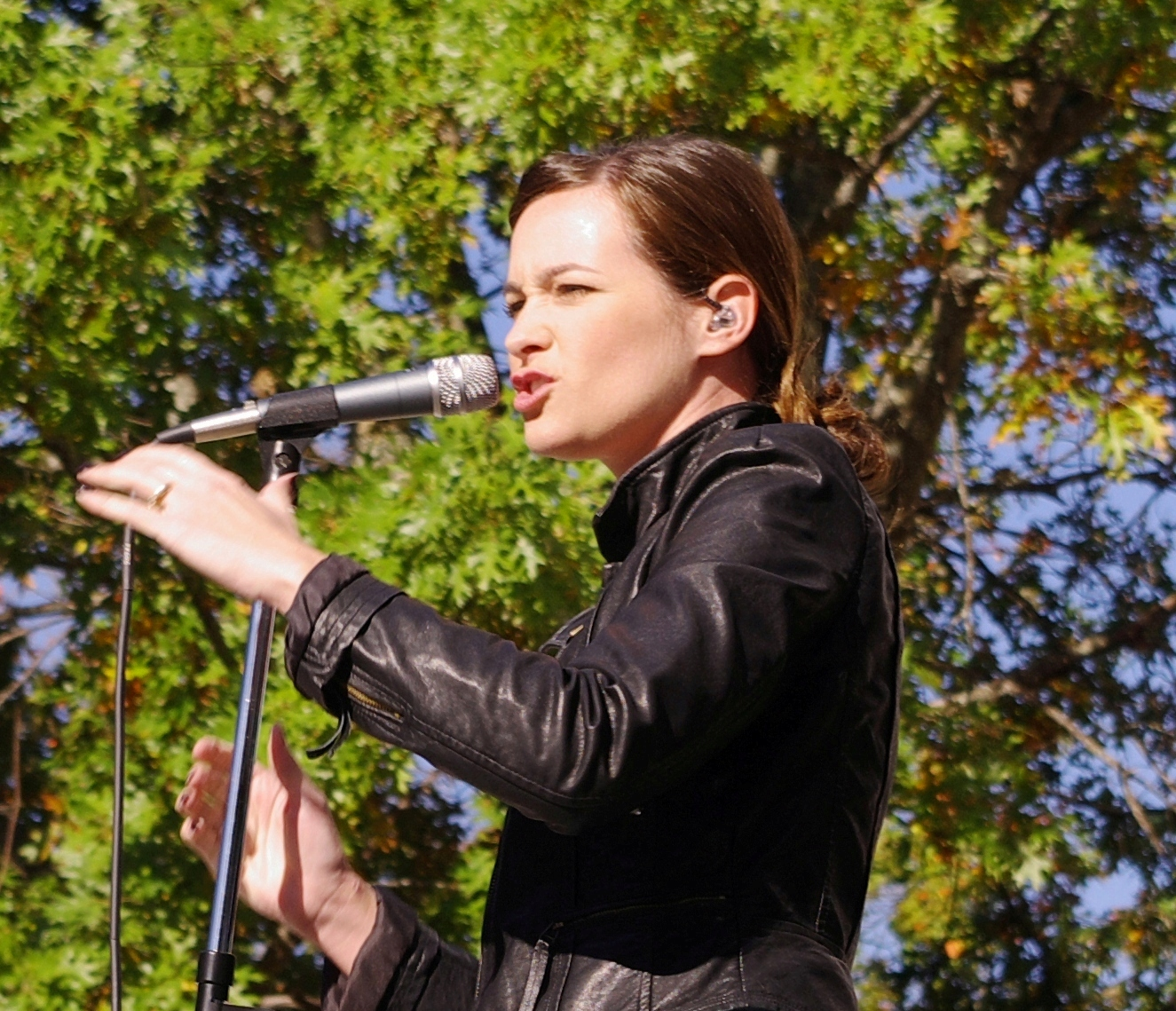
- Krista Branch performing at a rally for presidential candidate Herman Cain in Cookeville, Tennessee.

Background information
- Born: Mount Pleasant, Texas, United States
- Genres: Rock
- Occupation: Vocalist
- Years active: 2010 – current
- Website: Official website

Krista Branch is an American singer whose 2010 song "I Am America" has been called the anthem of the Tea Party movement. Branch produced "I Am America" with her husband, who wrote the song, to protest the treatment of the Tea Party by Democrats. After being uploaded to YouTube, the song was aired on Glenn Beck's radio show and it quickly grew in popularity. It was subsequently performed on Fox News and at events across the country. A former American Idol contestant, Branch was eliminated early in the process.

Branch was born in Mount Pleasant, Texas, and later lived in Bixby, Oklahoma. She married Michael Branch in 2000, and together they have three children. Early in the marriage, her family faced serious financial difficulties, and later, while they were living in Colorado, faced the near death of their youngest daughter.

The Branches became supporters of 2012 presidential candidate Herman Cain after performing at several events where he was a keynote speaker, and "I Am America" was made the official theme song of the campaign. Another song released by Branch, "Remember Who We Are", was made the official campaign anthem of Rick Santorum's presidential campaign.

Branch's music regularly expresses religious and political themes emphasizing American exceptionalism. Her music has been well received among conservative commentators and members of the Tea Party movement for its political message. The use of Branch's music in the campaigns of Cain and Santorum has been seen as an indication of its appeal among outsider candidates. She has released nine singles and an EP, and released her debut album, Calm in the Chaos, on January 11, 2019.

== Personal life ==
Branch was born in Mount Pleasant in East Texas, and began singing in her youth at church along with her four siblings. She also lived in Oklahoma for part of her childhood. Branch moved out of Texas with her family at the age of 14, but remained proud of her Texas heritage. To focus on her music career, Branch and her family moved to Nashville, Tennessee, in 2010.

She married Michael Branch in 2000, and they have since had three children together. Early in their marriage they had a low income, and Branch's husband took on several odd jobs, in addition to his work as a youth pastor, to make a living. He describes living with Branch in a "shabby place" in Tulsa, Oklahoma, where they struggled to pay $480 a month in rent. Later, they bought a house in Tulsa, and rented it out while they were living in Colorado; they got into financial difficulties when the tenants stopped paying the rent, and they accepted the bank's decision to foreclose the mortgage, as that cleared their debt. They appeared on the Christian news magazine program, the 700 Club, talking about an incident in which their baby daughter was revived after drowning in their bathtub, and they attributed their child's survival to the power of prayer, having been inspired after seeing The Passion of the Christ a few days earlier.

== Career ==
While living in Bixby, Oklahoma, Branch auditioned for the seventh season of American Idol and was chosen by the judges to move on to the preliminary round in Hollywood. Footage of her performance was not included on the show, but she appeared in a montage at the end of the episode. A week later, she was eliminated from the competition. Branch told The New York Times her decision to enter the contest was not due to a desire to "be somebody", but because she felt she should take any opportunity with the belief that God would bless her efforts.

Two years later, the video for Branch's fourth single, "I Am America", was released on YouTube. Her husband, Michael Branch, wrote the song partly in response to criticism of the Tea Party protests from Democrats, while also drawing on his own difficulties in life. In an interview for Billy Kelly of the Washington Times' Tea Party Report, Branch told how soon after her husband wrote the song. he had her quickly learn the lyrics and then recorded her performing the song. She originally felt the song was too confrontational for her, but decided the message was so important that she should record it. In the music video, footage of Tea Party rallies is interspersed with scenes of Branch singing on a sound stage and kids holding signs containing political messages and scripture. "I Am America" was played on the July 7, 2010, broadcast of Glenn Beck's radio show and a week later Fox News host Bill O'Reilly devoted a portion of his "Pinheads and Patriots" segment to the song, saying that "for honoring legitimate protest", Branch was a patriot. About 21 days after being uploaded, the video had nearly 475,000 views. "I Am America" soon became a popular song with the Tea Party movement and has been described as the movement's anthem. The New York Times described Branch as having a "dynamic presence" on stage when singing the song.

Glenn Beck played another Krista Branch song titled "Remember Who We Are" on his Insider Extreme radio program early in August 2010, and the song was featured in a video from Branch promoting Beck's Restoring Honor rally. The lyrics for "Remember Who We Are" contain a mixture of defiant metaphors with a Christian rock style of music. Branch's husband said he wrote the song to "remind us of who Americans are in the wake of the most trying of times." He stated that Americans stand up and come together in the face of adversity, saying he prayed the song would bring people hope. Calling it an "inspiring patriotic song", the video for the song was made the "Video of the Day" on Glenn Beck's site on September 3, 2010.

Her first EP I Am America was released on September 3, 2010, by Soundmindpro Publishing, a company established by Branch's husband. The EP included "Remember Who We Are", "I Am America", and "Foreign Land", a song about departed American soldiers. Jeremiah Holdsworth of IndieVision felt the songs were strong, noting their patriotic themes and subtle religious subtext, and said the song "Foreign Land" particularly moved him. Branch released a new single on July 22, 2011, called "Lead Me On", a cover of the Amy Grant song and released a video for the song a month later. The song was described as pro-Israel with the music video containing imagery related to the history of the Jewish people, including a prominent emphasis on the Holocaust.

In addition to her performances in the United States, Branch has performed for teens in Guatemala and Slovakia. She performed at the 2011 Sunbelt Ag Expo in conjunction with the American Bible Society, singing patriotic songs to support American soldiers and performing the national anthem for the expo. Branch attended the Washington Times' 30th-anniversary celebration on October 3, 2012, and performed several songs for the event. Branch regularly performs with Oklahoma jazz saxophonist Grady Nichols. She is working on her debut album, which was scheduled to be released in early 2013.

=== 2012 Republican presidential primaries ===
Branch's music has gained prominence as a result of its use during the 2012 Republican presidential primary. When she was performing "I Am America" at events across the country, Herman Cain was often the keynote speaker. Branch and her husband came to appreciate his political views and her husband signed on with Cain's campaign. "I Am America" was later adopted by the candidate as his campaign's official theme. Cain said when interviewed about the song, "The first time I heard that song, the message was so right-on, I felt goose bumps just listening to it." The song was later described by the National Journal as having "underscored Cain's anti-elitist appeal" with its lyrics. Campaign ads featuring "I Am America" gave the song increased exposure. On The Colbert Report, comedian Stephen Colbert satirically claimed Cain got the line "I Am America" from Colbert's book, I Am America (And So Can You!). Several parodies of the ad were then shown on the program using the song.

Rick Santorum announced in March 2012 that he has adopted Branch's song "Remember Who We Are" as an official theme song for his campaign, having been without a theme song prior to the announcement. Santorum said he chose the song because "few songs express the beauty and strength of who we are as free Americans better than Krista's." The song is seen as representing the emotion of his campaign effort. David Weigel described Branch as the "muse of the insurgent conservative candidate" due to her songs being used by Cain and Santorum in their primary campaigns.

== Politics ==
Branch has said her patriotism and admiration for America is the unifying principle of her music. She suggests the Tea Party is animated not by rebelliousness, but by patriotism and love of freedom. Her music often incorporates political themes and religious views that have led to her songs resonating with Tea Party supporters and commentators such as Glenn Beck and Bill O'Reilly.

The artist has performed at political rallies led by Beck, and at campaign rallies for Herman Cain. Her husband joined Cain's presidential campaign as state director for Tennessee after hearing him speak at events where Branch performed. Branch said Cain was a natural choice for her husband and her because she felt their beliefs aligned with Cain's. Since 2010, she received three payments that totaled $10,000 for live entertainment services provided at political rallies from several political action committees associated with Cain's campaign.

== Discography ==
Year	Song	Album
2010	"I Am America"	Single
2010	"Remember Who We Are"	Single
2010	I Am America	EP
2011	"Lead Me On" (cover)	Single
2011	"Crumbling Castle"	Single
2011	"God of This Nation" (feat. Andy Chrisman)	Single
2011	"Can You Hear Us Now"	Single
