= 9–9–9 Plan =

US taxation proposal

The 9–9–9 Plan was a tax proposal that was a centerpiece of Herman Cain's 2012 campaign for the Republican Party's nomination for president of the United States. It was introduced in August 2011. The plan called for the replacement of all current taxes, such as the payroll tax, capital gains tax, and the estate tax, with a 9% personal income tax, 9% federal sales tax, and a 9% corporate tax.

== History ==
In July 2011, an advisor suggested the name "the Optimal tax" for the Cain campaign's tax policy plan. Cain rejected the name, saying, "We're just going to call it what it is: 9–9–9 Plan."

The proposal would introduce a 9% personal income tax, 9% federal sales tax, and 9% corporate tax to replace the country's current tax system. During a debate on October 12, Cain said that his plan would "expand the base", arguing, "When you expand the base, we can arrive at the lowest possible rate, which is 9–9–9."

== Summary ==
Cain's campaign website summarized the 9–9–9 Plan:

Our current economic crisis calls for bold action to truly stimulate the economy and Renew America back to its greatness. The 9–9–9 Plan gets Washington D.C. out of the business of picking winners and losers, using the tax code to dole out favors, and dividing the country with class warfare. It is fair, simple, transparent and efficient. It taxes everything once and nothing twice. It taxes the broadest possible base at the lowest possible rates. It is neutral with respect to savings and consumption, capital and labor, imports and exports and whether companies pay dividends or retain earnings.

Under his plan, corporations would be able to deduct the costs of goods sold if the inputs were made in the US and capital expenditures, but not wages, salaries, and benefits to employees. Deductions other than charitable giving would be eliminated. The federal sales tax would not apply to used goods. Cain claimed that the 9–9–9 Plan would lift a $430 billion dead-weight burden on the economy.

== Reception ==
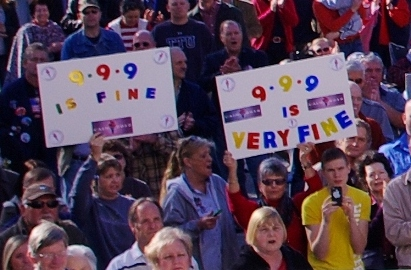
Cain supporters with signs celebrating his 9–9–9 plan

Cain spoke about having designated empowerment zones, wherein a lower percentage such as 3% is paid instead. However, some have called Cain's plan more regressive than current tax policy at the time, stating that it would raise taxes for most households but cut taxes for those with the highest income.

An analysis that the campaign released to Bloomberg News claimed that the lowest possible rate for each of the three taxes was 7.3%. Nevertheless, the campaign insisted on poverty grants, which Cain has described as a lower rate in targeted empowerment zones, would necessitate a national tax rate of 9%. Paul Krugman has criticized the plan, saying that it shifts much of the current tax burden from the rich to the poor.

Economist Arthur Laffer, financial analyst Larry Kudlow, and the Club for Growth have spoken favorably of the 9–9–9 Plan. On October 21, Cain told an audience in Detroit that the plan would be "9–0–9" for the poor, saying, "if you are at or below the poverty level ... then you don't pay that middle 9 on your income."

Cain's 9–9–9 Plan attracted skepticism from his fellow candidates at numerous Republican debates. In a debate on October 28, 2011, several of the other contenders for the GOP nomination attacked the plan. Candidate Rick Santorum referenced the Tax Policy Center's claim that 84% of Americans would pay more and that the plan would entail "major increases in taxes on people", a charge that Cain denied. Former Treasury official Gary Robbins stated that the 9–9–9 Plan would expand the GDP by $2 trillion, create 6 million new jobs, increase business investment by 33%, and increase wages by 10%. Also, Arthur Laffer, a supply-side economist, told Human Events that "Herman Cain's 9–9–9 plan would be a vast improvement over the current tax system and boom the U.S. economy."

Conversely, other economists did not believe that the 9–9–9 plan would stimulate demand. Bruce Bartlett, an economist under the Reagan and H. W. Bush administrations, has written that Cain's plan "would increase the budget deficit without doing anything to stimulate demand."

The Economist criticized the 9–9–9 plan, stating that the Cain plan would not result in a reduction in the current corporate tax but instead a new value-added tax (VAT). The newspaper also stated that Cain's final tax would be a 30% VAT, as compared to the 15% VAT in the European Union.

According to Cain,

Unlike a state sales tax, which is an add-on tax that increases the price of goods and services, this is a replacement tax. It replaces taxes that are already embedded in selling prices. By replacing higher marginal rates in the production process with lower marginal rates, marginal production costs actually decline, which will lead to prices being the same or lower, not higher.

== 9–9–9 the Movie – Slaying the Tax Monster ==
During his campaign, Cain released a six-minute movie that explained his 9–9–9 Plan called 9–9–9 the Movie – Slaying the Tax Monster. CBS News reported:

In '9–9–9 the Movie – Slaying the Tax Monster,' the Cain campaign continues to hammer home the idea that a simple plan is the best one. The 9–9–9 Plan is simple enough to vanquish the ineffective bureaucrats that lurk in the dark crannies of complexity; transparent enough to deter cronyism, and fair enough—fair being the dictionary definition, not the president's class warfare definition—to level the playing field and keep the government from picking winners and losers, the video's narrator says.

== Cain's Solutions Revolution ==
On January 4, 2012, Cain announced the "Cain's Solutions Revolution". His stated goal was to obtain commitments from members of Congress to support the 9–9–9 Plan before the 2012 elections. He had started a new movement, saying that the "biggest comment I got when I ended my candidacy was to keep 9–9–9 alive. That's what this is about, and I'm going to keep it alive with what I'm calling Cain's Solutions Revolution." To promote the movement, Cain used both a bus tour and a new website. New York magazine stated that "it's Cain's earnest effort to keep 9–9–9 alive and focus on solutions." On January 20, 2012, Cain spoke at Stephen Colbert's "Rock Me Like a Herman Cain: South Cain-Olina Primary Rally". The Huffington Post reported that between 3,000 and 5,000 people were in the crowd at the rally. The Hollywood Reporter called it "the largest campaign rally so far during this GOP presidential primary season", and The Philadelphia Inquirer said that it was "the biggest political rally of the primary season."

== 9–9–9 Fund ==
The 9–9–9 Fund is a political action committee (PAC) that was founded by supporters of Herman Cain. The PAC spent more than $468,000 in November 2011 to support Cain's presidential campaign. In December 2011, the 9–9–9 Fund director, Jordan Gehrke, stated that the 9–9–9 Fund had decided not to endorse a candidate for president. The Christian Post reported that the 9–9–9 Fund may continue to support Cain in the future.

== Revolution on the Hill ==
On April 16, 2012, Cain held an event named Revolution on the Hill in Washington, DC, in support of his 9–9–9 tax plan.

== Supporters ==
Notable people who expressed support for the 9–9–9 Plan included:

- Arthur Laffer – economist
- Lawrence Kudlow – financial analyst
- The Club for Growth – a 527 organization focused on taxation and other economic issues
- Dick Morris – political consultant
- Samuel Joseph Wurzelbacher – candidate for the 2012 United States House of Representatives elections in Ohio
- John Linder – former U.S. Representative for Georgia's 7th congressional district
- Martha Zoller – columnist, author, and radio personality
- Pete Hoekstra – former Representative for Michigan's 2nd congressional district
- Sam Rohrer – former member of the Pennsylvania House of Representatives
- Jack Hoogendyk – former member of the Michigan House of Representatives
- Duane Sand – a former North Dakota candidate for U.S. Senate

== See also ==
- 9–9–9: An Army of Davids
- Herman Cain 2012 presidential campaign
- Optimal tax
- Proportional tax
- SimCity 4: The city building game where 9% on tax is the optimal taxation rate. The 9-9-9 Plan was compared to SimCity 4 on CNBC.
- Tax reform
