= Worshipful Company of Tobacco Pipe Makers and Tobacco Blenders =

Livery company of the City of London

The Worshipful Company of Tobacco Pipe Makers and Tobacco Blenders is one of the Livery Companies of the City of London. The company ranks 82nd in the order of precedence of the Companies. It does not have its own livery hall but is peripatetic, meeting instead at halls of various other livery companies.

The company's motto is Producat Terra, Latin for Out of the Earth. Its church is St. Lawrence Jewry next Guildhall, the official Church of the Corporation of London, located on Gresham Street. It also uses St James Garlickhythe for its annual carol service in December.

== History ==
The company was first incorporated in 1619 by royal charter granted by King James I, as the Society of Tobacco Pipe Makers of Westminster with responsibility for regulating the manufacture of clay tobacco pipes. It was short-lived due to internal conflicts between the pipe makers and the clay merchants who were members. In 1634 King Charles I re-incorporated the company as the Tobacco-pipe Makers of London and Westminster and England and Wales. This became a City of London Company, often meeting in the Worshipful Company of Painter-Stainers' Hall.

Like many others, following the outbreak of the English Civil War in 1642 the company forfeited its charter in 1643 through non-payment of its annual rent to the King. The company was restored by King Charles II in 1663 and operated for another 200 years, but disappeared from the list of Livery Companies in 1868 after its powers of regulation over tobacco pipe makers were abolished and income from its members had declined significantly.

The company was reincorporated as the Worshipful Company of Tobacco Pipe Makers and Tobacco Blenders in 1954 by members of the Briar Pipe and Tobacco Trades and in 1960 was granted the right to become a Livery Company once more, ranked 82nd in the order of precedence as a Modern Company.

The Modern Company admitted its first female Freeman, Fiona J Adler, in 1987. Sally Merton became its first female Liveryman in 1992.

In 2011 Fiona Adler became the company's first female Master. Her grandfather had been elected as the first Master of the Third Company in 1954 and again in 1965. Her father was Master of the Company in 1982. Fiona Adler was elected Non-Aldermanic Sheriff of the City of London for 2014–15. She was appointed as the Honorary Secondary to the City of London at the Old Bailey in early 2023, following a decision by the Court of Aldermen on the recommendation of their General Purposes Committee.

== Modern activities and officers ==
In common with most of the other City of London livery companies, the company is no longer a trade association and is concerned primarily with philanthropy, benevolence and fellowship, although it also takes a strong interest in supporting the continuation of the craft of clay and briar pipe making in the UK.

The company's Liverymen are entitled to vote in Common Hall, thus taking part in the governance of the City of London through the annual elections of the Lord Mayor and Sheriffs.

The company's Freemen and Liverymen take part in a wide range of social events and charitable activities. They donate and raise funds that are distributed to a wide range of charities and educational institutions through the company's Benevolent Fund.

From 2010 until 2025 the Benevolent Fund also administered the Tobacco Trade Benevolent Association's Welfare Fund, supporting those who have worked in the tobacco trade and their families. In 2025 responsibility for that Fund and its administration passed to the Trustees of GroceryAid.

The Company installs its Master and four Wardens annually in the first week of June. The Master of the company for 2025-26 is Tony Scanlan. The Clerk is Ms Sandra Stocker. The company's Honorary Chaplain is the Revd Canon Jack Noble, Vicar of St Giles-without-Cripplegate. The Beadle is Daniel Partridge, a Yeoman Warder (Beefeater) at the Tower of London.
