= Order of Grenada =

Grenadian society of honour

- Badge of the Companion of the Order of Grenada

Awarded by the Monarch of Grenada
- Type: Order of chivalry
- Established: 1994
- Motto: Ever Conscious of God we Aspire, Build and Advance as One People
- Eligibility: Any citizen of Grenada and citizens of other countries
- Awarded for: Distinguished and outstanding service or meritorious service or achievement, or for gallantry.
- Status: Currently constituted
- Sovereign: Charles III
- Chancellor (ex officio): Cecile La Grenade

Precedence
- Next (higher): Order of the Nation
- Next (lower): Governor General Medal of Honour
- Ribbon of the order

The Order of Grenada is a society of honour instituted through the Grenada National Honours Act of 1994. The Order was subsequently reconstituted and substantially reformed by the National Honours and Awards Act of 2007.

The order recognises distinguished and outstanding service or meritorious service or achievement, or for gallantry. Nationals of Grenada and non-nationals may receive this order.

King Charles III is the sovereign of the order in his capacity as King of Grenada.

== Appointment ==
Appointments to the order are made by the governor-general of Grenada, as chancellor, who acts on the advice of the prime minister of Grenada and the National Awards Advisory Committee.

The governor-general is formally advised by the National Awards Advisory Committee which consists of a citizen of Grenada appointed by the governor-general after consultation with the prime minister of Grenada and the leader of the opposition, the chairperson of the Public Service Commission, the commissioner of Police, two persons representative of the public appointed by the governor-general, one of whom is nominated by the prime minister and one nominated by the leader of the opposition, and two persons appointed by the governor-general after consultation with civil society and with the religious community.

Awards are usually announced each year on the occasion of the National Day of Grenada – 7 February.

== Composition ==
The Order of Grenada consists of the Sovereign (King of Grenada), the Chancellor (Governor-General of Grenada), and of six individual awards. Within the Order of Grenada is also an Order of Knighthood, consisting of six grades:

- The Companion of the Order of Grenada
- The Order of Grenada Gold Award for Excellence
- The Spice Isle Award
- The Camerhogne Award
- The Medal of Honour
- The Most Distinguished Order of the Nation, which is an order of knighthood.

Citizens of other countries may be admitted to the order as members ad honorem.

Outside of the National Honours and Awards Act, the Crown continues to appoint Grenadians to the Order of Saint Michael and Saint George and the Order of the British Empire on the advice of the Grenadian government. The governor-general carries out investitures for these awards at Governor-General's House.

== Notable recipients ==
Companion of the Order of Grenada

- Daniel Williams, 2008
- Rosalind Howells, Baroness Howells of St Davids, 2009
- Johnson Beharry, 2017
- Kirani James, 2024

Order of Grenada Gold Award for Excellence

- Eudine Barriteau, 2015
- Timothy Antoine, 2016

Camerhogne Award

- Irva Baptiste Bleckett, 2009
