= New Hampshire Straw Poll =

The New Hampshire Straw Poll is a straw poll for the United States Republican presidential primary elections that was started in 2011 through promotion by ABC News and WMUR-TV. The first poll was held on Saturday, January 22, 2011, in Derry, New Hampshire, a year in advance of the New Hampshire primary, which as is traditional will be the first primary in the 2012 Republican Party presidential nomination process. Voters in the poll were among some 400 members of the state Republican Party attending a meeting at the Pinkerton Academy in Derry. As with all straw polls, the results are in no way binding.

== 2011 poll ==
Mitt Romney won the 2011 poll with 35 percent of the vote. Second was Ron Paul with 11 percent, and third place was taken by Tim Pawlenty with 8 percent. They were followed by Sarah Palin with 7 percent and Michele Bachmann and Jim DeMint with 5 percent each. Those with less than that included Herman Cain, Rick Santorum, Mitch Daniels, Newt Gingrich, Mike Huckabee, Mike Pence, and a number of others.

Romney had been expected to win, based upon his geographical proximity to the state. Of the contenders, only Romney, Pawlenty, and Santorum had spent a lot of time in New Hampshire in the months preceding the straw poll, and only Cain was at the time an actual declared candidate.

=== Results ===
Finish	Potential Candidate	Percentage of the vote
1	Mitt Romney	35%
2	Ron Paul	11%
3	Tim Pawlenty	8%
4	Sarah Palin	7%
5	Michele Bachmann	5%
6	Jim DeMint	5%
7	Herman Cain	4%
8	Chris Christie	3%
9	Rick Santorum	3%
10	Mitch Daniels	3%
11	Newt Gingrich	3%
12	Mike Huckabee	3%
13	Mike Pence	3%
