= Restoring Courage tour =

- Date: August 24, 2011
- Location: Main event: Temple Mount Western Wall and Safra Square, Jerusalem. Viewing parties in more than 60 countries.
- Website: GlennBeck.com/Israel

Restoring Courage was a campaign announced in May 2011 by media personality Glenn Beck featuring a media event that took place in Jerusalem, on August 24, 2011, "to stand with the Jewish people". While announcing the rally, he expressed a belief that a two-state solution would "[cut] off Jerusalem, the Old City, to the rest of the world". Beck said security arrangements and logistics would pose a challenge: "The very gates of hell will open up against us." Beck's Mercury Radio Arts sponsored three rallies or observances associated with Restoring Courage, including a rally attended by hundreds of supporters on August 24 at the Southern Wall of the Temple Mount.

== Events ==
During the lead-up to the tour, on June 27, 2011, Beck was invited to address the Knesset Immigration, Absorption, and Diaspora Affairs Committee on July 11, 2011. Beck was asked to advise members on how to counter delegitimization of Israel. Beck's scheduler, Jonny Daniels, said that Beck's address would be filmed for his online show, he would visit historical sites all over Israel sacred to Jews and Christians, and he would also visit Tamar Fogel, whose parents and three siblings were killed in the Itamar attack.

The ecumenical gathering "The Courage to Love" was held as part of the campaign on August 21, 2011, before an audience of 3,000 people attended the event at the Caesarea amphitheater, with the event broadcast to over a thousand churches, mostly in the United States. Gospel singer Vernessa Mitchell headlined the musical portion, accompanied and supplemented by various Israeli singers and musicians. Along with Beck, speakers included evangelical minister and amateur historian David Barton, Efrat founder Rabbi Shlomo Riskin, author Mike Evans, Christians United for Israel founder Pastor John Hagee, Florida megachurch pastor Tom Mullins, and American-born Israeli Orthodox Rabbi Aryeh A. Leifert.

An observance in remembrance of the Holocaust titled "Courage to Remember" took place in the Old Train Station Plaza in Jerusalem August 22, 2011. It featured an invocation by Rabbi Moshe Rothchild, remarks by Beck, actor and activist Jon Voight, the screening of the documentary film Kleiner Rudy by Michelle Stein Teer about her grandfather, Holocaust survivor Rudy Wolff and personal family memoirs, a short documentary about a solemn tour by Beck and his wife Tania of Auschwitz, and a panel discussion including Beck, Rabbi David Greenblatt of United With Israel, David Brog of Christians United for Israel, and author Mike Evans The program ended with a candle-passing ceremony among Rudy Wolff's descendants, accompanied by the young tenor Benjamin P. Wenzelberg of New York's The Metropolitan Opera Children's Chorus, followed by stadium fireworks.

A comparatively more impromptu event during Beck's tour was the dinner he hosted the evening of August 23, 2011, at Jerusalem's Bible Lands Museum. At his speech there, Beck said:

We have spent 2,000 years at each other's throats, mainly us at your throat. It is time to stand and say, 'Enough.' It is time to return home to His throne and beg His forgiveness and tell him unequivocally we will knock it off, we will stand arm in arm. The times require it; it is not a human rights movement, it is a human responsibility movement. If we do not recognize our responsibilities, we have no rights. This is the beginning, there is no end until we all live in peace and we all respect the Jewish people and their rights to live here in peace.

Performing at "Courage to Stand" on August 24 before an audience of about 1,700 near the Western Wall (with another 2,000 watching a broadcast on a large screen at the overflow venue of Jerusalem's Safra Square) were cantor and singer Dudu Fisher and choirmaster and conductor Meir Briskman. Along with the performance of the Israeli national anthem "Hatikva," a blessing by Rabbi Shlomo Riskin, a letter from Muslim Sheikh Abdel-Khaer Jabari of Hebron (read by David Brog), were speeches by Shmuel Rabinovitch, rabbi of the holy sites in Israel, Mayor Nir Barkat of Jerusalem, and Member of the Knesset Danny Danon (Likud), as well as a keynote speech by Beck; and Mathew Staver, Dean of Liberty University School of Law, introduced and presented the event's designated Faith, Hope, and Charity Awards to respective honorees: the Fogel family (victims of the attack on Itamar; presented posthumously and accepted by the mayor of Itamar on their behalf), Jewish-and-Arab co-owners of the suicide-bombed Maxim restaurant of Haifa, and philanthropist Rami Levy.

== Reactions ==
Several dozen individuals rallied in a counter-protest near the venue of the August 24 event, organized by the Israeli activist organization Peace Now, declaring that Beck's campaign and its location were ill-advised or inappropriate. Their chants for Beck to go home, etc., could be heard during Beck's rally on that day. A small pro-Beck demonstration was also situated nearby, at which was sung the Israeli national anthem.

Before the main rally, American commentator (and appellate defense attorney) Alan Dershowitz said that he would wait to hear Beck's statements in Israel before offering an evaluation – also saying, "I disagree with much of Beck's politics and with virtually all of his conspiracy theorizing. Yet I admire his courage in putting his body in the line of fire. I believe him when he says: 'If the world goes down the road of dehumanizing Jews again, "then count me a Jew and come for me first.'" Influential rabbi Yosef Shalom Eliashiv, Israeli settler activist Moshe Feiglin and Dov Lior, rabbi of Kiryat Arba, opposed the rally as a harbinger of Christian missionary zeal within the Jewish homeland.
