= Order of the Nation (Grenada) =

Most Distinguished Order of The Nation
- Badge of the order

Awarded by the Monarch of Grenada
- Type: Order of chivalry As part of the Order of Grenada
- Established: 2007
- Motto: Aspire, Build and Advance
- Eligibility: Any citizen of Grenada and citizens of other countries
- Awarded for: Distinguished and outstanding service or meritorious service or achievement, or for gallantry.
- Status: Currently constituted
- Sovereign: Charles III
- Chancellor (ex officio): Cecile La Grenade

Precedence
- Next (higher): Order of the National Hero
- Next (lower): Order of Grenada
- Ribbon of the order

The Most Distinguished Order of the Nation is an order of chivalry which forms part of the overarching Order of Grenada. The Order was formed following the reforms to the Order of Grenada enacted by the National Honours and Awards Act, which having been passed by the House of Representatives of Grenada on 16 November 2007 and passed by the Senate of Grenada on 27 November 2007 received Royal Assent on 31 December 2007.

The order recognises distinguished and outstanding service or meritorious service or achievement, or for gallantry. Nationals of Grenada and non-nationals may receive this order.

King Charles III is the sovereign of the order in his capacity as King of Grenada and Sovereign of the Order of Grenada.

== Appointment ==
Appointments to the order are made by the governor-general of Grenada, as chancellor, who acts on the advice of the prime minister of Grenada and the National Awards Advisory Committee.

The governor-general is formally advised by the National Awards Advisory Committee which consists of a citizen of Grenada appointed by the governor-general after consultation with the prime minister of Grenada and the leader of the opposition, the chairperson of the Public Service Commission, the commissioner of Police, two persons representative of the public appointed by the governor-general, one of whom is nominated by the prime minister and one nominated by the leader of the opposition, and two persons appointed by the governor-general after consultation with civil society and with the religious community.

Awards are usually announced each year on the occasion of the National Day of Grenada – 7 February.

== Composition ==
The Order of The Nation, as part of the Order of Grenada, consists of the Sovereign (King of Grenada), the Chancellor (Governor-General of Grenada), and six grades:

1. Knight Grand Collar (KN) or Dame Grand Collar (DN)
2. Knight Grand Cross (GCNG) or Dame Grand Cross (DGNG)
3. Knight Commander (KCNG) or Dame Commander (DCNG)
4. Commander (CNG)
5. Officer (ONG)
6. Member (MNG)

Knights Grand Collar, Knights Grand Cross and Knights Commanders (categories 1, 2 and 3 above) are entitled to prefix the title Sir, and Dames Grand Collar, Dames Grand Cross and Dames Commanders to prefix Dame, to their forenames for life. Permission to use these titles outside Grenada remain the prerogative of each jurisdiction.

Wives of Knights may prefix Lady to their surname, but no equivalent privilege exists for husbands of Dames. All grades of the Order come with post nominals of their grade.

Citizens of other countries may be admitted to the order as members ad honorem.

== Notable recipients ==
- Lawrence Albert Joseph - Knight Commander
- Mallory Factor - Knight Commander (ad honorem)
- Charles R. Modica - Commander
- Jason deCaires Taylor - Member (ad honorem)
- Kirani James - Knight Grand Cross
- Gloria Banfield - Dame Commander
- Walter Clement Noel - Knight Grand Cross (Posthumous)
