= Garin (surname) =

Garin, or in Spanish-speaking countries Garín, is a surname. Notable people with the surname include:

- Antoine Marie Garin (1810 –1889) French Roman Catholic priest, missionary and educationalist in New Zealand, particularly in Nelson.
- André Garin (1822–1895), American Roman Catholic priest
- Cristian Garín (born 1996), Chilean tennis player
- Erast Garin (1902–1980), Russian actor
- Eugene Garin (1922–1994), Ukrainian painter and artist
- Geoff Garin (born 1953), American political consultant
- Hermes Garín (born 1947), Uruguayan Roman Catholic bishop
- Hernán Garín (born 1983), Argentine footballer
- Janette Garin (born 1972), Filipino politician
- Laila Garin (born 1978), Brazilian actress and singer
- Manuela Garín (1914–2019), Spanish-born Mexican mathematician
- Marie-Charlotte Garin (born 1995), French politician
- Maurice Garin (1871–1957), French cyclist, winner of the first Tour de France 1903
- Nikolai Garin-Mikhailovsky (1852–1906), Russian writer
- Oleg Garin (various people)
- Vladimir Garin (1987–2003), Russian actor

Fictional characters

- Pyotr Petrovich Garin or Engineer Garin, the main character in Aleksey Tolstoy's novel The Garin Death Ray (also in the films The Hyperboloid of Engineer Garin and Failure of Engineer Garin)
- Seth Garin, character in Richard Bachman's novel The Regulators
- William Garin, character in The Great Wall played by Matt Damon
- Engineer Garin of The Garin Death Ray, 1927 novel by Tolstoy
  - The Hyperboloid of Engineer Garin, Soviet 1965 film based on the book
  - Failure of Engineer Garin, Soviet 1973 film based on the book
