= Garin =

Garin may refer to:

== Geography ==
- Garín, Argentina, a town in Buenos Aires, Argentina
- Garin, Iran, a village in Kerman Province, Iran
- Garin Rural District, an administrative subdivision of Hamadan Province, Iran
- Garin, Haute-Garonne
- Alternative for the Gorin (river), Khabarovsk Krai, Russia
- Garin, former Armenian name given to Erzurum/Theodosiopolis (Armenia)

== Names ==
- Garin (given name)
- Garin (surname)

== Others ==
- Gar'in, a Hebrew term for groups of immigrants
- Garin Tzabar, a program for children of Israelis and Diaspora Jews to facilitate their service in the Israeli military
- Garin College, a secondary school in Nelson, New Zealand

== See also ==
- Guerin (disambiguation) (French Guérin)
