= Garin (given name) =

Garin, Warin, Guarin, Guarino (Italian), or Garí (Catalan) is a name and may refer to:

- Guarin, 12th-century Siculo-Norman chancellor
- Garin de Monglane, legendary warrior
- Garin d'Apchier, inventor of the descort
- Garin lo Brun, troubadour
- See The Hyperboloid of Engineer Garin for Engineer Garin, a fictional engineer from Aleksei Tolstoy's book
- Garin, Haute-Garonne, a commune in southern France
- Garin de Montaigu, 13th Grand Master of the Knights Hospitaller
- Garin Veris, American football defensive end
- Garin Cecchini, baseball player
- Garin Morgan, Civil Engineer, South Africa

== See also ==
- Garin (surname)
- Garin (disambiguation)
