= Early/Mid 2012 statewide opinion polling for the 2012 United States presidential election =

Statewide polls for the 2012 United States presidential election are as follows. The polls listed here, by state, are from January 1 to August 31, 2012, and provide early data on opinion polling between a possible Republican candidate against incumbent President Barack Obama.

Note that some states had not conducted polling yet or no updated polls were present from January 1 to August 31, 2012.

Obama vs. Romney

Obama vs. Gingrich

Obama vs. Santorum

Obama vs. Paul

== Alabama ==
9 electoral votes
(Republican in 2004) 62%–38%
(Republican in 2008) 60%–38%

Poll source	Date administered	Democrat	%	Republican	%	Lead margin	Sample size	Margin of error
Capital Survey Research Center	August 13–16, 2012	Barack Obama	36%	Mitt Romney	54%	18	452 RV	±4.6%
Capital Survey Research Center	June 7, 18–19, 26–27, 2012	Barack Obama	36%	Mitt Romney	51%	15	551 LV	±4.2%

== Arizona ==
11 electoral votes
(Republican in 2004) 55%–44%
(Republican in 2008) 53%–45%

Poll source	Date administered	Democrat	%	Republican	%	Lead margin	Sample size	Margin of error
Public Policy Polling	July 23–25, 2012	Barack Obama	41%	Mitt Romney	52%	11	833 RV	±3.4%
Rasmussen Reports/Pulse Opinion Research	June 26, 2012	Barack Obama	41%	Mitt Romney	54%	13	500 LV	±4.5%
Project New America/Public Policy Polling (D)	June 4–5, 2012	Barack Obama	46%	Mitt Romney	49%	3	791 RV	±3.5%
Public Policy Polling	May 17–20, 2012	Barack Obama	43%	Mitt Romney	50%	7	500 RV	±4.4%
DC London/Magellan Strategies (R)	April 30 – May 2, 2012	Barack Obama	43%	Mitt Romney	52%	9	909 LV	±3.25%
Behavior Research Center (Rocky Mountain Poll))	April 9–17, 2012	Barack Obama	42%	Mitt Romney	40%	2	511 RV	±4.4%
Arizona State University	April 8–14, 2012	Barack Obama	40%	Mitt Romney	42%	2	488 RV	±4.4%
Rasmussen Reports/Pulse Opinion Research	March 13, 2012	Barack Obama	40%	Mitt Romney	51%	11	500 LV	±4.5%
Rasmussen Reports/Pulse Opinion Research	March 13, 2012	Barack Obama	44%	Rick Santorum	45%	1	500 LV	±4.5%
NBC News/Marist College	February 19–20, 2012	Barack Obama	40%	Mitt Romney	45%	5	2,487 RV	±1.8%
NBC News/Marist College	February 19–20, 2012	Barack Obama	41%	Ron Paul	43%	2	2,487 RV	±1.8%
NBC News/Marist College	February 19–20, 2012	Barack Obama	45%	Newt Gingrich	40%	5	2,487 RV	±1.8%
NBC News/Marist College	February 19–20, 2012	Barack Obama	42%	Rick Santorum	45%	3	2,487 RV	±1.8%
Public Policy Polling	February 17–19, 2012	Barack Obama	47%	Mitt Romney	47%	Tie	743 RV	±3.6%
Public Policy Polling	February 17–19, 2012	Barack Obama	46%	Ron Paul	42%	4	743 RV	±3.6%
Public Policy Polling	February 17–19, 2012	Barack Obama	48%	Newt Gingrich	44%	4	743 RV	±3.6%
Public Policy Polling	February 17–19, 2012	Barack Obama	46%	Rick Santorum	47%	1	743 RV	±3.6%
Behavior Research Center (Rocky Mountain Poll)	January 5–9, 2012	Barack Obama	37%	Mitt Romney	43%	6	553 RV	±4.3%
Behavior Research Center (Rocky Mountain Poll)	January 5–9, 2012	Barack Obama	44%	Ron Paul	36%	8	553 RV	±4.3%
Behavior Research Center (Rocky Mountain Poll)	January 5–9, 2012	Barack Obama	45%	Newt Gingrich	35%	10	553 RV	±4.3%
Behavior Research Center (Rocky Mountain Poll)	January 5–9, 2012	Barack Obama	43%	Rick Santorum	34%	9	553 RV	±4.3%

Three way race

Poll source	Date administered	Democrat	%	Republican	%	Libertarian	%	Lead margin	Sample size	Margin of error
Public Policy Polling	May 17–20, 2012	Barack Obama	41%	Mitt Romney	45%	Gary Johnson	9%	4	500 RV	±4.4%

== Arkansas ==
6 electoral votes
(Republican in 2004) 54%–45%
(Republican in 2008) 59%–39%

Poll source	Date administered	Democrat	%	Republican	%	Lead margin	Sample size	Margin of error
Talk Business/Hendrix College	March 26, 2012	Barack Obama	33%	Mitt Romney	56.5%	23.5	759 LV	±3.6%

== California ==
55 electoral votes
(Democratic in 2004) 54%–45%
(Democratic in 2008) 61%–37%

Poll source	Date administered	Democrat	%	Republican	%	Lead margin	Sample size	Margin of error
Policy Analysis for California Education/USC Rossier School of Education/Tulchin Research	August 3–7, 2012	Barack Obama	55.6%	Mitt Romney	32.7%	22.9	1,041 LV	±3.0%
CBRT/Pepperdine University/M4 Strategies	July 16–17, 2012	Barack Obama	51.9%	Mitt Romney	32.6%	19.3	812 LV	±3.4%
Field Research Corporation (Field Poll)	June 21 – July 2, 2012	Barack Obama	55%	Mitt Romney	37%	18	848 LV	±3.4%
SurveyUSA	May 27–29, 2012	Barack Obama	57%	Mitt Romney	36%	21	1,575 RV	±2.5%
Field Research Corporation (Field Poll)	May 21–29, 2012	Barack Obama	48%	Mitt Romney	32%	16	710 RV	±3.8%
USC Dornsife/Los Angeles Times/Greenberg Quinlan Rosner/American Viewpoint	May 17–21, 2012	Barack Obama	56%	Mitt Romney	37%	19	1,002 RV	±3.5%
Public Policy Institute of California	May 14–20, 2012	Barack Obama	50%	Mitt Romney	39%	11	894 LV	±4.2%
SurveyUSA	March 29, 2012 – April 2, 2012	Barack Obama	62%	Mitt Romney	31%	31	1,995 RV	±2.2%
USC Dornsife/Los Angeles Times/Greenberg Quinlan Rosner/American Viewpoint	March 14–19, 2012	Barack Obama	57%	Mitt Romney	36%	21	1,500 RV	±2.9%
Field Research Corporation (Field Poll)	February 11–18, 2012	Barack Obama	55%	Mitt Romney	35%	20	1,000 RV	±3.1%
Rasmussen Reports/Pulse Opinion Research	February 8–16, 2012	Barack Obama	57%	Mitt Romney	35%	22	500	±4.5%
Rasmussen Reports/Pulse Opinion Research	February 8–16, 2012	Barack Obama	58%	Rick Santorum	30%	28	500	±4.5%
SurveyUSA	February 8–9, 2012	Barack Obama	60%	Mitt Romney	31%	29	2,088 RV	±2.1%
SurveyUSA	February 8–9, 2012	Barack Obama	63%	Newt Gingrich	27%	36	2,088 RV	±2.1%
SurveyUSA	February 8–9, 2012	Barack Obama	61%	Ron Paul	29%	31	2,088 RV	±2.1%
SurveyUSA	February 8–9, 2012	Barack Obama	61%	Rick Santorum	29%	32	2,088 RV	±2.1%

== Colorado ==
9 electoral votes
(Republican in 2004) 52%–47%
(Democratic in 2008) 54%–45%

Poll source	Date administered	Democrat	%	Republican	%	Lead margin	Sample size	Margin of error
Keating Research/OnSight Public Affairs	August 21–22, 2012	Barack Obama	48%	Mitt Romney	44%	4	500 LV	±4.4%
Purple Strategies	August 13–14, 2012	Barack Obama	49%	Mitt Romney	46%	3	600 LV	±4.0%
Rasmussen Reports/Pulse Opinion Research	August 6, 2012	Barack Obama	47%	Mitt Romney	47%	Tied	500 LV	±4.5%
Public Policy Polling	August 2–5, 2012	Barack Obama	49%	Mitt Romney	43%	6	779 LV	±3.5%
Purple Strategies	July 9–13, 2012	Barack Obama	45%	Mitt Romney	44%	1	600 LV	±4.0%
Priorities USA Action/Garin-Hart-Yang-Research Group (D)	June 25 – July 5, 2012	Barack Obama	49%	Mitt Romney	42%	7	608 LV	±4.%
We Ask America	June 25, 2012	Barack Obama	46.6%	Mitt Romney	43%	3.6	1,083 LV	±2.98%
Public Policy Polling	June 14–17, 2012	Barack Obama	49%	Mitt Romney	42%	7	799 LV	±3.5%
Rasmussen Reports/Pulse Opinion Research	June 7, 2012	Barack Obama	45%	Mitt Romney	45%	Tied	500 LV	±4.5%
Purple Strategies	May 31 – June 5, 2012	Barack Obama	48%	Mitt Romney	46%	2	600 LV	±4.0%
NBC News/Marist College	May 22–24, 2012	Barack Obama	46%	Mitt Romney	45%	1	1,030 RV	±3.0%
Project New America/Keating Research/Keating Research/OnSight Public Affairs (D)	May 21–24, 2012	Barack Obama	48%	Mitt Romney	44%	4	601 RV	±4.0%
Purple Strategies	April 19–23, 2012	Barack Obama	47%	Mitt Romney	47%	Tied	Not reported	±4.1%
Public Policy Polling	April 5–7, 2012	Barack Obama	53%	Mitt Romney	40%	13	542	±4.2%
Public Policy Polling	April 5–7, 2012	Barack Obama	55%	Newt Gingrich	37%	18	542	±4.2%
Public Policy Polling	April 5–7, 2012	Barack Obama	54%	Rick Santorum	38%	16	542	±4.2%
Public Policy Polling	April 5–7, 2012	Barack Obama	47%	Ron Paul	42%	5	542	±4.2%

Three way race

Poll source	Date administered	Democrat	%	Republican	%	Libertarian	%	Lead margin	Sample size	Margin of error
Public Policy Polling	August 2–5, 2012	Barack Obama	46%	Mitt Romney	42%	Gary Johnson	4%	4	779	±3.5%
Public Policy Polling	June 14–17, 2012	Barack Obama	47%	Mitt Romney	39%	Gary Johnson	7%	8	799	±3.5%

== Connecticut ==
7 electoral votes
(Democratic in 2004) 54%–44%
(Democratic in 2008) 61%–38%

Poll source	Date administered	Democrat	%	Republican	%	Lead margin	Sample size	Margin of error
Quinnipiac University	August 22–26, 2012	Barack Obama	52%	Mitt Romney	45%	7	1,472 LV	±2.6%
Rasmussen Reports/Pulse Opinion Research	August 21, 2012	Barack Obama	51%	Mitt Romney	43%	8	500 LV	±4.5%
Quinnipiac University	May 29, 2012 – June 3, 2012	Barack Obama	50%	Mitt Romney	38%	12	1,408	±2.6%
Quinnipiac University	March 14–19, 2012	Barack Obama	53%	Mitt Romney	37%	16	1,622	±2.4%
Quinnipiac University	March 14–19, 2012	Barack Obama	55%	Rick Santorum	35%	20	1,622	±2.4%

== Florida ==
29 electoral votes
(Republican in 2004) 52%–47%
(Democratic in 2008) 51%–48%

Poll source	Date administered	Democrat	%	Republican	%	Lead margin	Sample size	Margin of error
CNN/Time/Opinion Research Corporation	August 22–26, 2012	Barack Obama	50%	Mitt Romney	46%	4	776 LV	±3.5%
CBS News/New York Times/Quinnipiac University	August 15–21, 2012	Barack Obama	49%	Mitt Romney	46%	3	1,241 LV	±2.8%
Gravis Marketing	August 20, 2012	Barack Obama	45%	Mitt Romney	48%	3	728 LV	±3.8%
Foster McCollum White Baydoun/Douglas Fulmer & Associates	August 17, 2012	Barack Obama	39.9%	Mitt Romney	54.46%	14.56	1,503 LV	±2.53%
Rasmussen Reports/Pulse Opinion Research	August 15, 2012	Barack Obama	43%	Mitt Romney	45%	2	500 LV	±4.5%
Purple Strategies	August 13–14, 2012	Barack Obama	47%	Mitt Romney	48%	1	600 LV	±4.0%
CBS News/New York Times/Quinnipiac University	July 24–30, 2012	Barack Obama	51%	Mitt Romney	45%	6	1,177 LV	±3.0%
Public Policy Polling	July 26–29, 2012	Barack Obama	48%	Mitt Romney	47%	1	871 LV	±3.3%
WFLA-TV Tampa/SurveyUSA	July 17–19, 2012	Barack Obama	48%	Mitt Romney	43%	5	647 LV	±3.9%
Purple Strategies	July 9–13, 2012	Barack Obama	45%	Mitt Romney	48%	3	600 LV	±4.0%
Mason-Dixon Polling & Research	July 9–11, 2012	Barack Obama	46%	Mitt Romney	45%	1	800 RV	±3.5%
Rasmussen Reports/Pulse Opinion Research	July 9, 2012	Barack Obama	45%	Mitt Romney	46%	1	500 LV	±4.5%
Priorities USA/Garin-Hart-Yang Research Group (D)	June 25 – July 3, 2012	Barack Obama	48%	Mitt Romney	44%	4	608 LV	±4.0%
We Ask America	July 1–2, 2012	Barack Obama	46.1%	Mitt Romney	45.3%	0.8	1,127 LV	±2.9%
Quinnipiac University	June 19–25, 2012	Barack Obama	45%	Mitt Romney	41%	4	1,200 RV	±2.8%
Quinnipiac University	June 12–18, 2012	Barack Obama	46%	Mitt Romney	42%	4	1,697 RV	±2.4%
Purple Strategies	May 31, 2012 – June 5, 2012	Barack Obama	45%	Mitt Romney	49%	4	600 LV	±4.0%
Public Policy Polling	May 31 – June 3, 2012	Barack Obama	50%	Mitt Romney	46%	4	642 RV	±3.9%
Quinnipiac University	May 15–21, 2012	Barack Obama	41%	Mitt Romney	47%	6	1,722 RV	±2.4%
NBC News/Marist College	May 17–20, 2012	Barack Obama	48%	Mitt Romney	44%	4	1,078 RV	±3.0%
Suffolk University/7News	May 6–8, 2012	Barack Obama	46%	Mitt Romney	45%	1	600 RV	±4%
Quinnipiac University	April 25 – May 1, 2012	Barack Obama	43%	Mitt Romney	44%	1	1,169 RV	±2.9%
Rasmussen Reports/Pulse Opinion Research	April 25, 2012	Barack Obama	45%	Mitt Romney	46%	1	500 LV	±4.5%
Purple Strategies	April 19–23, 2012	Barack Obama	45%	Mitt Romney	47%	2	600 LV	±4.1%
Fox News/Anderson Robbins/Shaw & Company	April 15–17, 2012	Barack Obama	45%	Mitt Romney	43%	2	757 RV	±4.0%
Public Policy Polling	April 12–15, 2012	Barack Obama	52%	Newt Gingrich	40%	8	700 LV	±3.7%
Public Policy Polling	April 12–15, 2012	Barack Obama	50%	Ron Paul	40%	10	700 LV	±3.7%
Public Policy Polling	April 12–15, 2012	Barack Obama	50%	Mitt Romney	45%	5	700 LV	±3.7%
Quinnipiac University	March 20–26, 2012	Barack Obama	49%	Mitt Romney	42%	7	1,228 RV	±2.8%
Quinnipiac University	March 20–26, 2012	Barack Obama	50%	Rick Santorum	37%	13	1,228 RV	±2.8%
Rasmussen Reports/Pulse Opinion Research	March 13, 2012	Barack Obama	46%	Mitt Romney	43%	3	500 LV	±4.5%
Rasmussen Reports/Pulse Opinion Research	March 13, 2012	Barack Obama	45%	Rick Santorum	43%	2	500 LV	±4.5%
Rasmussen Reports/Pulse Opinion Research	February 9, 2012	Barack Obama	47%	Mitt Romney	44%	3	500 LV	±4.5%
Rasmussen Reports/Pulse Opinion Research	February 9, 2012	Barack Obama	47%	Rick Santorum	46%	1	500 LV	±4.5%
NBC News/Marist College	January 25–27, 2012	Barack Obama	49%	Mitt Romney	41%	8	1,739 LV	±2.7%
NBC News/Marist College	January 25–27, 2012	Barack Obama	52%	Newt Gingrich	35%	17	1,739 LV	±2.7%
NBC News/Marist College	January 25–27, 2012	Barack Obama	50%	Ron Paul	36%	14	1,739 LV	±2.7%
NBC News/Marist College	January 25–27, 2012	Barack Obama	50%	Rick Santorum	35%	15	1,739 LV	±2.7%
Mason-Dixon Research & Polling/Miami Herald/El Nuevo Herald	January 24–26, 2012	Barack Obama	44%	Mitt Romney	48%	4	800 LV	±3.5%
Mason-Dixon Research & Polling/Miami Herald/El Nuevo Herald	January 24–26, 2012	Barack Obama	50%	Newt Gingrich	41%	9	800 LV	±3.5%
Mason-Dixon Research & Polling/Miami Herald/El Nuevo Herald	January 24–26, 2012	Barack Obama	50%	Rick Santorum	39%	11	800 LV	±3.5%
Suffolk University	January 22–24, 2012	Barack Obama	42%	Mitt Romney	47%	5	600 RV	Not reported
Suffolk University	January 22–24, 2012	Barack Obama	49%	Newt Gingrich	40%	9	600 RV	Not reported
Quinnipiac University	January 19–23, 2012	Barack Obama	45%	Mitt Romney	45%	Tied	1,518 RV	±2.5%
Quinnipiac University	January 19–23, 2012	Barack Obama	50%	Newt Gingrich	39%	11	1,518 RV	±2.5%
Quinnipiac University	January 19–23, 2012	Barack Obama	47%	Ron Paul	39%	8	1,518 RV	±2.5%
Quinnipiac University	January 19–23, 2012	Barack Obama	49%	Rick Santorum	40%	9	1,518 RV	±2.5%
Everglades Foundation/Tarrance Group (R)	January 4–8, 2012	Barack Obama	46%	Mitt Romney	45%	1	607 LV	±4.1%
Quinnipiac University	January 4–8, 2012	Barack Obama	43%	Mitt Romney	46%	3	1,412 RV	±2.8%
Quinnipiac University	January 4–8, 2012	Barack Obama	45%	Rick Santorum	43%	2	1,412 RV	±2.8%

Three way race

Poll source	Date administered	Democrat	%	Republican	%	Libertarian	%	Lead margin	Sample size	Margin of error
Mason Dixon	July 9–11, 2012	Barack Obama	46%	Mitt Romney	45%	Gary Johnson	2%	1	800	±3.5%

== Georgia ==
16 electoral votes
(Republican in 2004) 58%–41%
(Republican in 2008) 52%–47%

Poll source	Date administered	Democrat	%	Republican	%	Lead margin	Sample size	Margin of error
20/20 Insight	August 15–18, 2012	Barack Obama	46%	Mitt Romney	49%	3	1,158 LV	±2.9%
Majority Opinion Research/InsiderAdvantage	May 22, 2012	Barack Obama	40%	Mitt Romney	52%	12	438	Not reported
Rosetta Stone Communications/Landmark Communications	May 10, 2012	Barack Obama	40.2%	Mitt Romney	51.1%	10.9	600 RV	±4.0%
SurveyUSA	February 23–26, 2012	Barack Obama	44%	Newt Gingrich	48%	4	1,156 RV	±2.9%
SurveyUSA	February 23–26, 2012	Barack Obama	42%	Mitt Romney	49%	7	1,156 RV	±2.9%
SurveyUSA	February 23–26, 2012	Barack Obama	43%	Rick Santorum	47%	4	1,156 RV	±2.9%
SurveyUSA	February 23–26, 2012	Barack Obama	43%	Ron Paul	46%	3	1,156 RV	±2.9%

== Illinois ==
20 electoral votes
(Democratic in 2004) 55%–45%
(Democratic in 2008) 62%–37%

Poll source	Date administered	Democrat	%	Republican	%	Lead margin	Sample size	Margin of error
Crain's Chicago Business/Ipsos	July 16–22, 2012	Barack Obama	51%	Mitt Romney	31%	20	600	±4.7%
WGN-TV/Chicago Tribune	February 2–6, 2012	Barack Obama	56%	Mitt Romney	35%	21	600	±4.0%

== Indiana ==
11 electoral votes
(Republican in 2004) 60%–39%
(Democratic in 2008) 50%–49%

Poll source	Date administered	Democrat	%	Republican	%	Lead margin	Sample size	Margin of error
Rasmussen Reports/Pulse Opinion Research	July 31 – August 1, 2012	Barack Obama	35%	Mitt Romney	51%	16	400 LV	±5.0%
Rasmussen Reports/Pulse Opinion Research	May 25, 2012	Barack Obama	42%	Mitt Romney	48%	6	600 LV	±4.0%
Howey Politics/DePauw University/Bellwether Research/Garin-Hart-Yang Research Group	March 26–27, 2012	Barack Obama	40%	Mitt Romney	49%	9	503 LV	±4.5%
Howey Politics/DePauw University/Bellwether Research/Garin-Hart-Yang Research Group	March 26–27, 2012	Barack Obama	41%	Rick Santorum	46%	5	503 LV	±4.5%

== Iowa ==
6 electoral votes
(Republican in 2004) 50%–49%
(Democratic in 2008) 54%–44%

Poll source	Date administered	Democrat	%	Republican	%	Lead margin	Sample size	Margin of error
Public Policy Polling	August 23–26, 2012	Barack Obama	47%	Mitt Romney	45%	2	1,244 LV	±2.8%
Rasmussen Reports/Pulse Opinion Research	August 8, 2012	Barack Obama	44%	Mitt Romney	46%	2	500 LV	±4.5%
Public Policy Polling	July 12–15, 2012	Barack Obama	48%	Mitt Romney	43%	5	1,131 RV	±2.91%
We Ask America	June 18, 2012	Barack Obama	45%	Mitt Romney	44%	1	1,086 LV	±3.0%
Rasmussen Reports/Pulse Opinion Research	June 11, 2012	Barack Obama	46%	Mitt Romney	47%	1	500 LV	±4.5%
NBC News/Marist College	May 22–24, 2012	Barack Obama	44%	Mitt Romney	44%	Tied	1,106 RV	±3.0%
Public Policy Polling	May 3–6, 2012	Barack Obama	47%	Ron Paul	39%	8	1,181 RV	±2.85%
Public Policy Polling	May 3–6, 2012	Barack Obama	51%	Mitt Romney	41%	10	1,181 RV	±2.85%
Des Moines Register/Selzer & Co.	February 12–15, 2012	Barack Obama	51%	Newt Gingrich	37%	14	611 LV	±3.5%
Des Moines Register/Selzer & Co.	February 12–15, 2012	Barack Obama	44%	Mitt Romney	46%	2	611 LV	±3.5%
Des Moines Register/Selzer & Co.	February 12–15, 2012	Barack Obama	42%	Ron Paul	49%	7	611 LV	±3.5%
Des Moines Register/Selzer & Co.	February 12–15, 2012	Barack Obama	44%	Rick Santorum	48%	4	611 LV	±3.5%

== Maine ==
4 electoral votes
(Democratic in 2004) 53%–45%
(Democratic in 2008) 58%–40%

Poll source	Date administered	Democrat	%	Republican	%	Lead margin	Sample size	Margin of error
Portland Press Herald/Critical Insights	June 20–25, 2012	Barack Obama	49%	Mitt Romney	35%	14	615 RV	±4.0%
MassINC Polling Group	June 13–14, 2012	Barack Obama	48%	Mitt Romney	34%	14	506 LV	±4.4%
Critical Insights	May 2–7, 2012	Barack Obama	50%	Mitt Romney	42%	8	600 RV	±4.0%
Public Policy Polling	March 2–4, 2012	Barack Obama	54%	Ron Paul	38%	16	1,256 RV	±2.8%
Public Policy Polling	March 2–4, 2012	Barack Obama	58%	Rick Santorum	35%	23	1,256 RV	±2.8%
Public Policy Polling	March 2–4, 2012	Barack Obama	60%	Newt Gingrich	32%	28	1,256 RV	±2.8%
Public Policy Polling	March 2–4, 2012	Barack Obama	58%	Mitt Romney	35%	23	1,256 RV	±2.8%

== Maryland ==
10 electoral votes
(Democratic in 2004) 56%–43%
(Democratic in 2008) 61%–38%

Poll source	Date administered	Democrat	%	Republican	%	Lead margin	Sample size	Margin of error
Marylanders for Marriage Equality/Public Policy Polling (D)	May 14–16, 2012	Barack Obama	58%	Mitt Romney	35%	23	852 LV	±3.4%

== Massachusetts ==
11 electoral votes
(Democratic in 2004) 62%–37%
(Democratic in 2008) 62%–36%

Poll source	Date administered	Democrat	%	Republican	%	Lead margin	Sample size	Margin of error
Kimball Political Consulting	August 21, 2012	Barack Obama	52%	Mitt Romney	41%	11	592 LV	±4%
Public Policy Polling	August 16–19, 2012	Barack Obama	55%	Mitt Romney	39%	16	1,115LV	±2.9%
Public Policy Polling	June 22–24, 2012	Barack Obama	55%	Mitt Romney	39%	16	902LV	±3.3%
Western New England University	May 29–31, 2012	Barack Obama	56%	Mitt Romney	34%	22	504 LV	±4.4%
The Boston Globe/University of New Hampshire	May 25–31, 2012	Barack Obama	46%	Mitt Romney	34%	12	651 LV	±3.8%
Suffolk University	May 20–22, 2012	Barack Obama	59%	Mitt Romney	34%	25	600 LV	±4%
Rasmussen Reports/Pulse Opinion Research	May 7, 2012	Barack Obama	56%	Mitt Romney	35%	21	500 LV	±4.5%
Rasmussen Reports/Pulse Opinion Research	April 9, 2012	Barack Obama	51%	Mitt Romney	40%	11	500 LV	±4.5%
The Boston Globe/University of New Hampshire	March 21–27, 2012	Barack Obama	49%	Mitt Romney	33%	16	544 LV	±4.4%
Public Policy Polling	March 16–18, 2012	Barack Obama	62%	Newt Gingrich	28%	34	936 RV	±3.2%
Public Policy Polling	March 16–18, 2012	Barack Obama	58%	Ron Paul	30%	28	936 RV	±3.2%
Public Policy Polling	March 16–18, 2012	Barack Obama	58%	Mitt Romney	35%	23	936 RV	±3.2%
Public Policy Polling	March 16–18, 2012	Barack Obama	61%	Rick Santorum	29%	32	936 RV	±3.2%
MassLive.com/The Republican/Western New England University	February 23 – March 1, 2012	Barack Obama	60%	Mitt Romney	34%	26	527 RV	±4.3%
Rasmussen Reports/Pulse Opinion Research	February 29, 2012	Barack Obama	55%	Mitt Romney	38%	17	500 LV	±4.5%
Rasmussen Reports/Pulse Opinion Research	February 29, 2012	Barack Obama	58%	Rick Santorum	32%	26	500 LV	±4.5%
Suffolk University	February 11–15, 2012	Barack Obama	63%	Newt Gingrich	27%	36	600 LV	±4.0%
Suffolk University	February 11–15, 2012	Barack Obama	53%	Mitt Romney	39%	14	600 LV	±4.0%
Suffolk University	February 11–15, 2012	Barack Obama	59%	Rick Santorum	32%	27	600 LV	±4.0%
Suffolk University	February 11–15, 2012	Barack Obama	60%	Ron Paul	26%	34	600 LV	±4.0%
Mass Insight Global Partnerships/Opinion Dynamics Corporation	January 31 – February 4, 2012	Barack Obama	56%	Mitt Romney	38%	18	456 RV	±4.6%

Four Way race

Poll source	Date administered	Democrat	%	Republican	%	Green	%	Libertarian	%	Lead margin
Public Policy Polling; Margin of error: ±3.3% Sample size: 902LV	June 22–24, 2012	Barack Obama	53%	Mitt Romney	38%	Jill Stein	3%	Gary Johnson	1%	15

== Michigan ==
16 electoral votes
(Democratic in 2004) 51%–48%
(Democratic in 2008) 57%–41%

Poll source	Date administered	Democrat	%	Republican	%	Lead margin	Sample size	Margin of error
EPIC-MRA	August 28, 2012	Barack Obama	49%	Mitt Romney	46%	3	1200 LV	±2.6%
Mitchell Research & Communications	August 23, 2012	Barack Obama	46.6%	Mitt Romney	47.7%	0.1	1277 LV	±2.74%
Detroit News/Glengariff Group	August 18–20, 2012	Barack Obama	47.5%	Mitt Romney	42.0%	5.5	600 LV	±4.0%
Foster McCollum White & Associates/Baydoun Consulting	August 16, 2012	Barack Obama	44%	Mitt Romney	48%	4	1,733 LV	±2.35%
Mitchell Research & Communications	August 13, 2012	Barack Obama	49%	Mitt Romney	44%	5	1,079 LV	±2.98%
EPIC-MRA	July 24–31, 2012	Barack Obama	48%	Mitt Romney	42%	6	600 LV	±3.5%
Mitchell Research & Communications	July 23, 2012	Barack Obama	44%	Mitt Romney	45%	1	825 LV	±3.4%
Rasmussen Reports/Pulse Opinion Research	July 23, 2012	Barack Obama	48%	Mitt Romney	42%	6	500 LV	±4.5%
Public Policy Polling	July 21–23, 2012	Barack Obama	53%	Mitt Romney	39%	14	579 RV	±4.1%
NBC News/Marist College	June 24–25, 2012	Barack Obama	47%	Mitt Romney	43%	4	1,078 RV	±3.0%
Mitchell Research & Communications	June 18, 2012	Barack Obama	47%	Mitt Romney	46%	1	750 LV	±3.58%
We Ask America	June 18, 2012	Barack Obama	43%	Mitt Romney	45%	2	1,010LV	±3.0%
Lambert, Edwards & Associates/Denno Research	June 14–15, 2012	Barack Obama	40%	Mitt Romney	40%	Tied	600 LV	±4%
Rasmussen Reports/Pulse Opinion Research	June 14, 2012	Barack Obama	50%	Mitt Romney	42%	8	500 LV	±4.5%
Baydoun Consulting/Foster McCollum White & Associates	June 12, 2012	Barack Obama	46.89%	Mitt Romney	45.48%	1.41	1,783	±2.32%
EPIC-MRA	June 2–5, 2012	Barack Obama	45%	Mitt Romney	46%	1	600 LV	±4%
Public Policy Polling	May 24–27, 2012	Barack Obama	53%	Mitt Romney	39%	14	500 RV	±4.4%
Glengariff Group	May 10–11, 2012	Barack Obama	45%	Mitt Romney	40%	5	600 LV	±4%
EPIC-MRA	March 31 – April 3, 2012	Barack Obama	47%	Mitt Romney	43%	4	600 LV	±4%
Marketing Resource Group	March 14–19, 2012	Barack Obama	49%	Mitt Romney	42%	7	600 LV	±4%
NBC News/Marist College	February 19–20, 2012	Barack Obama	55%	Rick Santorum	29%	26	3,149 RV	±1.8%
NBC News/Marist College	February 19–20, 2012	Barack Obama	56%	Newt Gingrich	28%	28	3,149 RV	±1.8%
NBC News/Marist College	February 19–20, 2012	Barack Obama	53%	Ron Paul	31%	22	3,149 RV	±1.8%
NBC News/Marist College	February 19–20, 2012	Barack Obama	51%	Mitt Romney	33%	18	3,149 RV	±1.8%
Public Policy Polling	February 10–12, 2012	Barack Obama	50%	Rick Santorum	39%	11	560 RV	±4.14%
Public Policy Polling	February 10–12, 2012	Barack Obama	56%	Newt Gingrich	34%	22	560 RV	±4.14%
Public Policy Polling	February 10–12, 2012	Barack Obama	52%	Ron Paul	34%	18	560 RV	±4.14%
Public Policy Polling	February 10–12, 2012	Barack Obama	54%	Mitt Romney	38%	16	560 RV	±4.14%
Detroit Free Press/EPIC-MRA	January 21–25, 2012	Barack Obama	51%	Newt Gingrich	38%	13	600 LV	±4%
Detroit Free Press/EPIC-MRA	January 21–25, 2012	Barack Obama	48%	Mitt Romney	40%	8	600 LV	±4%

== Minnesota ==
10 electoral votes
(Democratic in 2004) 51%–48%
(Democratic in 2008) 54%–44%

Poll source	Date administered	Democrat	%	Republican	%	Lead margin	Sample size	Margin of error
KSTP-TV Minneapolis/SurveyUSA	July 17–19, 2012	Barack Obama	46%	Mitt Romney	40%	6	552 LV	±4.3%
Public Policy Polling	May 31 – June 3, 2012	Barack Obama	54%	Mitt Romney	39%	15	973 RV	±3.1%
KSTP-TV Minneapolis/Survey USA	May 9–10, 2012	Barack Obama	52%	Mitt Romney	38%	14	516 RV	±4.4%
KSTP-TV Minneapolis/Survey USA	January 31 – February 2, 2012	Barack Obama	49%	Mitt Romney	36%	13	542 RV	±4.3%
KSTP-TV Minneapolis/Survey USA	January 31 – February 2, 2012	Barack Obama	55%	Newt Gingrich	29%	26	542 RV	±4.3%
KSTP-TV Minneapolis/Survey USA	January 31 – February 2, 2012	Barack Obama	48%	Ron Paul	37%	11	542 RV	±4.3%
KSTP-TV Minneapolis/Survey USA	January 31 – February 2, 2012	Barack Obama	51%	Rick Santorum	32%	19	542 RV	±4.3%
Public Policy Polling	January 21–22, 2012	Barack Obama	54%	Newt Gingrich	39%	15	1,236 RV	±2.8%
Public Policy Polling	January 21–22, 2012	Barack Obama	52%	Rick Santorum	40%	12	1,236 RV	±2.8%
Public Policy Polling	January 21–22, 2012	Barack Obama	51%	Ron Paul	38%	13	1,236 RV	±2.8%
Public Policy Polling	January 21–22, 2012	Barack Obama	51%	Mitt Romney	41%	10	1,236 RV	±2.8%

== Missouri ==
10 electoral votes
(Republican in 2004) 53%–46%
(Republican in 2008) 49%–49%

Poll source	Date administered	Democrat	%	Republican	%	Lead margin	Sample size	Margin of error
Public Policy Polling	August 28–29, 2012	Barack Obama	41%	Mitt Romney	53%	12	621 LV	±3.9%
St. Louis Post-Dispatch/Mason-Dixon Polling & Research	August 22–23, 2012	Barack Obama	43%	Mitt Romney	50%	7	625 LV	±4.0%
Rasmussen Reports/Pulse Opinion Research	August 22, 2012	Barack Obama	47%	Mitt Romney	46%	1	500 LV	±4.5%
Public Policy Polling	August 20, 2012	Barack Obama	42%	Mitt Romney	52%	10	500 LV	±4.4%
KSDK-TV St. Louis/KSHB-TV Kansas City/KSPR-TV Springfield/KYTV-TV Springfield/SurveyUSA	August 9–12, 2012	Barack Obama	44%	Mitt Romney	45%	1	585 LV	±4.1%
Missouri Scout/Chilenski Strategies	August 8, 2012	Barack Obama	47%	Mitt Romney	48%	1	663LV	±3.8%
Rasmussen Reports/Pulse Opinion Research	July 30, 2012	Barack Obama	44%	Mitt Romney	50%	6	500 LV	±4.5%
We Ask America	July 24, 2012	Barack Obama	39.73%	Mitt Romney	49.01%	9.28	1,172 LV	±3.0%
Rasmussen Reports/Pulse Opinion Research	June 7, 2012	Barack Obama	42%	Mitt Romney	49%	7	500 LV	±4.5%
Public Policy Polling	May 24–27, 2012	Barack Obama	45%	Mitt Romney	44%	1	602 RV	±4.0%
Rasmussen Reports/Pulse Opinion Research	April 17, 2012	Barack Obama	45%	Mitt Romney	48%	3	500 LV	±4.5%
Rasmussen Reports/Pulse Opinion Research	March 14–15, 2012	Barack Obama	42%	Rick Santorum	51%	9	500 LV	±4.5%
Rasmussen Reports/Pulse Opinion Research	March 14–15, 2012	Barack Obama	41%	Mitt Romney	50%	9	500 LV	±4.5%
Public Policy Polling	January 27–29, 2012	Barack Obama	49%	Newt Gingrich	42%	7	582 RV	±4.1%
Public Policy Polling	January 27–29, 2012	Barack Obama	45%	Ron Paul	43%	2	582 RV	±4.1%
Public Policy Polling	January 27–29, 2012	Barack Obama	45%	Mitt Romney	45%	Tied	582 RV	±4.1%
Public Policy Polling	January 27–29, 2012	Barack Obama	47%	Rick Santorum	44%	3	582 RV	±4.1%

Three way race

Poll source	Date administered	Democrat	%	Republican	%	Libertarian	%	Lead margin	Sample size	Margin of error
Capitol Correspondent/North Star Campaign Systems/North Star Campaign Systems/Gravis Marketing (R)	August 23, 2012	Barack Obama	36.1%	Mitt Romney	53.1%	Gary Johnson	4.1%	17	1,057 A	±3.4%
We Ask America	July 24, 2012	Barack Obama	39.7%	Mitt Romney	49.0%	Gary Johnson	2.1%	9.3	1,172 LV	±3.0%

== Montana ==
3 electoral votes
(Republican in 2004) 59%–39%
(Republican in 2008) 49%–47%

Poll source	Date administered	Democrat	%	Republican	%	Lead margin	Sample size	Margin of error
Rasmussen Reports/Pulse Opinion Research	August 20, 2012	Barack Obama	38%	Mitt Romney	55%	17	500 LV	±4.5%
Rasmussen Reports/Pulse Opinion Research	June 18, 2012	Barack Obama	42%	Mitt Romney	51%	9	500	±5.0%
Rasmussen Reports/Pulse Opinion Research	May 2, 2012	Barack Obama	44%	Mitt Romney	51%	7	450 LV	±5.0%
Public Policy Polling	April 26–29, 2012	Barack Obama	43%	Mitt Romney	48%	5	934 RV	±3.2%
Public Policy Polling	April 26–29, 2012	Barack Obama	41%	Ron Paul	49%	8	934 RV	±3.2%
Public Policy Polling	April 26–29, 2012	Barack Obama	45%	Newt Gingrich	45%	Tie	934 RV	±3.2%
Rasmussen Reports/Pulse Opinion Research	February 22, 2012	Barack Obama	41%	Mitt Romney	48%	7	500 RV	±4.5%
Rasmussen Reports/Pulse Opinion Research	February 22, 2012	Barack Obama	41%	Rick Santorum	45%	4	500 RV	±4.5%

Three way race

Poll source	Date administered	Democrat	%	Republican	%	Libertarian	%	Lead margin	Sample size	Margin of error
Public Policy Polling	April 26–29, 2012	Barack Obama	41%	Mitt Romney	43%	Gary Johnson	8%	2	934	±3.2%

== Nebraska ==
5 electoral votes
(Republican in 2004) 66%–33%
(Republican in 2008) 57%–42%

Poll source	Date administered	Democrat	%	Republican	%	Lead margin	Sample size	Margin of error
Rasmussen Reports/Pulse Opinion Research	May 16, 2012	Barack Obama	39%	Mitt Romney	53%	14	500 LV	±4.5%
Public Policy Polling	March 22–25, 2012	Barack Obama	39%	Mitt Romney	51%	12	1,028 RV	±3.1%
Public Policy Polling	March 22–25, 2012	Barack Obama	38%	Rick Santorum	55%	17	1,028 RV	±3.1%
Public Policy Polling	March 22–25, 2012	Barack Obama	40%	Newt Gingrich	49%	9	1,028 RV	±3.1%
Public Policy Polling	March 22–25, 2012	Barack Obama	37%	Ron Paul	49%	12	1,028 RV	±3.1%
Rasmussen Reports/Pulse Opinion Research	March 5, 2012	Barack Obama	35%	Mitt Romney	52%	17	500 LV	±4.5%
Rasmussen Reports/Pulse Opinion Research	March 5, 2012	Barack Obama	37%	Rick Santorum	49%	12	500 LV	±4.5%

Second congressional district

Poll source	Date administered	Democrat	%	Republican	%	Lead margin	Sample size	Margin of error
Public Policy Polling	March 22–25, 2012	Barack Obama	45%	Mitt Romney	46%	1	Not reported	Not reported
Public Policy Polling	March 22–25, 2012	Barack Obama	47%	Rick Santorum	47%	Tied	Not reported	Not reported
Public Policy Polling	March 22–25, 2012	Barack Obama	46%	Newt Gingrich	44%	2	Not reported	Not reported
Public Policy Polling	March 22–25, 2012	Barack Obama	42%	Ron Paul	44%	2	Not reported	Not reported

== Nevada ==
6 electoral votes
(Republican in 2004) 51%–48%
(Democratic in 2008) 55%–43%

Poll source	Date administered	Democrat	%	Republican	%	Lead margin	Sample size	Margin of error
Public Policy Polling	August 23–26, 2012	Barack Obama	50%	Mitt Romney	47%	3	831 LV	±3.4%
Las Vegas Review-Journal/SurveyUSA	August 16–21, 2012	Barack Obama	47%	Mitt Romney	45%	2	869 LV	±3.4%
Rasmussen Reports/Pulse Opinion Research	July 24, 2012	Barack Obama	50%	Mitt Romney	45%	5	500 LV	±4.5%
Magellan Strategies	July 16–17, 2012	Barack Obama	50%	Mitt Romney	46%	4	665 RV	±3.8%
Public Policy Polling	June 7–10, 2012	Barack Obama	48%	Mitt Romney	42%	6	500 RV	±4.4%
NBC News/Marist College	May 22–24, 2012	Barack Obama	48%	Mitt Romney	46%	2	1,040 RV	±3.0%
Rasmussen Reports/Pulse Opinion Research	April 30, 2012	Barack Obama	52%	Mitt Romney	44%	8	500 LV	±4.5%
Public Policy Polling	March 29 – April 1, 2012	Barack Obama	51%	Mitt Romney	43%	8	533 RV	±4.2%
Public Policy Polling	March 29 – April 1, 2012	Barack Obama	54%	Rick Santorum	40%	14	533 RV	±4.2%
Public Policy Polling	March 29 – April 1, 2012	Barack Obama	49%	Ron Paul	42%	7	533 RV	±4.2%
Public Policy Polling	March 29 – April 1, 2012	Barack Obama	54%	Newt Gingrich	39%	15	533 RV	±4.2%
Rasmussen Reports/Pulse Opinion Research	March 19, 2012	Barack Obama	50%	Mitt Romney	44%	6	500 LV	±4.5%
Rasmussen Reports/Pulse Opinion Research	March 19, 2012	Barack Obama	52%	Rick Santorum	36%	16	500 LV	±4.5%

Three-way race

Poll source	Date administered	Democrat	%	Republican	%	Libertarian	%	Lead Margin	Sample size	Margin of error
We Ask America	July 17–18, 2012	Barack Obama	49%	Mitt Romney	43%	Gary Johnson	2%	6	1,092 LV	±2.95%

== New Hampshire ==
4 electoral votes
(Democratic in 2004) 50%–49%
(Democratic in 2008) 54%–45%

Poll source	Date administered	Democrat	%	Republican	%	Lead margin	Sample size	Margin of error
Public Policy Polling	August 9–12, 2012	Barack Obama	51%	Mitt Romney	45%	6	1,055 LV	±3.0%
WMUR/University of New Hampshire	August 1–12, 2012	Barack Obama	49%	Mitt Romney	46%	3	555 LV	±4.2%
Democracy for America/Public Policy Polling (D)	August 5–8, 2012	Barack Obama	50%	Mitt Romney	44%	6	1,591 LV	±2.5%
WMUR/University of New Hampshire	July 5–15, 2012	Barack Obama	49%	Mitt Romney	45%	4	470 LV	±4.5%
NBC News/Marist College	June 24–25, 2012	Barack Obama	43%	Mitt Romney	42%	1	1029 RV	±3.1%
American Research Group	June 21–24, 2012	Barack Obama	49%	Mitt Romney	46%	3	417 LV	Not reported
Rasmussen Reports/Pulse Opinion Research	June 20, 2012	Barack Obama	48%	Mitt Romney	43%	5	500 LV	±4.5%
Public Policy Polling	May 10–13, 2012	Barack Obama	53%	Mitt Romney	41%	12	1,163 RV	±2.9%
WMUR/University of New Hampshire	April 9–20, 2012	Barack Obama	51%	Mitt Romney	42%	9	486 LV	±4.4%
Dartmouth College	April 2–5, 2012	Barack Obama	42.4%	Mitt Romney	43.9%	1.5	403 RV	±4.9%
American Research Group	March 15–18, 2012	Barack Obama	48%	Mitt Romney	46%	2	557 RV	Not reported
WMUR/University of New Hampshire	January 25 – February 2, 2012	Barack Obama	50%	Mitt Romney	40%	10	495 LV	±4.4%
WMUR/University of New Hampshire	January 25 – February 2, 2012	Barack Obama	50%	Ron Paul	42%	8	495 LV	±4.4%
WMUR/University of New Hampshire	January 25 – February 2, 2012	Barack Obama	60%	Newt Gingrich	35%	25	495 LV	±4.4%
WMUR/University of New Hampshire	January 25 – February 2, 2012	Barack Obama	56%	Rick Santorum	35%	21	495 LV	±4.4%

Three way race

Poll source	Date administered	Democrat	%	Republican	%	Libertarian	%	Lead margin	Sample size	Margin of error
Public Policy Polling	May 10–13, 2012	Barack Obama	51%	Mitt Romney	38%	Gary Johnson	7%	13	1,163	±2.9%

== New Jersey ==
14 electoral votes
(Democratic in 2004) 52%–46%
(Democratic in 2008) 57%–42%

Poll source	Date administered	Democrat	%	Republican	%	Lead margin	Sample size	Margin of error
Rutgers University	August 23–25, 2012	Barack Obama	51%	Mitt Romney	37%	14	710 LV	±3.5%
Monmouth University	July 18–22, 2012	Barack Obama	51%	Mitt Romney	38%	13	678 RV	±3.8%
Quinnipiac University	July 9–15, 2012	Barack Obama	49%	Mitt Romney	38%	11	1,623 RV	±2.4%
Rutgers University	May 31 – June 4, 2012	Barack Obama	56%	Mitt Romney	33%	23	1,065 RV	±2.9%
Quinnipiac University	May 9–14, 2012	Barack Obama	49%	Mitt Romney	39%	10	1,582	±2.5%
Fairleigh Dickinson University (PublicMind)	April 30 – May 6, 2012	Barack Obama	50%	Mitt Romney	36%	14	797 RV	±3.5%
Quinnipiac University	April 3–9, 2012	Barack Obama	49%	Mitt Romney	40%	9	1,607 RV	±2.4%
Quinnipiac University	April 3–9, 2012	Barack Obama	51%	Rick Santorum	36%	15	1,607 RV	±2.4%
Quinnipiac University	February 21–27, 2012	Barack Obama	49%	Mitt Romney	39%	10	1,396 RV	±2.6%
Quinnipiac University	February 21–27, 2012	Barack Obama	55%	Newt Gingrich	30%	25	1,396 RV	±2.6%
Quinnipiac University	February 21–27, 2012	Barack Obama	52%	Rick Santorum	34%	18	1,396 RV	±2.6%
WABC-TV New York/SurveyUSA	February 24–26, 2012	Barack Obama	52%	Mitt Romney	38%	14	533 RV	±4.3%
WABC-TV New York/SurveyUSA	February 24–26, 2012	Barack Obama	61%	Newt Gingrich	27%	34	533 RV	±4.3%
WABC-TV New York/SurveyUSA	February 24–26, 2012	Barack Obama	57%	Rick Santorum	33%	24	533 RV	±4.3%
WABC-TV New York/SurveyUSA	February 24–26, 2012	Barack Obama	56%	Ron Paul	31%	25	533 RV	±4.3%
Rutgers University	February 9–11, 2012	Barack Obama	56%	Mitt Romney	31%	25	914 RV	±3.3%
Quinnipiac University	January 10–16, 2012	Barack Obama	48%	Mitt Romney	38%	10	1,460 RV	±2.6%

== New Mexico ==
5 electoral votes
(Republican in 2004) 50%–49%
(Democratic in 2008) 57%–42%

Poll source	Date administered	Democrat	%	Republican	%	Lead margin	Sample size	Margin of error
Rasmussen Reports/Pulse Opinion Research	August 21, 2012	Barack Obama	52%	Mitt Romney	38%	14	500 LV	±4.5%
Public Policy Polling	July 13–16, 2012	Barack Obama	49%	Mitt Romney	44%	5	724 RV	±3.6%
We Ask America	July 9–10, 2012	Barack Obama	51%	Mitt Romney	40%	11	1,295 LV	±2.8%
Patriot Majority/FM3 Research (D)	May 16–21, 2012	Barack Obama	48%	Mitt Romney	35%	13	502 RV	±4.4%
Public Policy Polling	April 19–22, 2012	Barack Obama	54%	Mitt Romney	40%	14	526 RV	±4.3%
Rasmussen Reports/Pulse Opinion Research	April 3, 2012	Barack Obama	53%	Rick Santorum	38%	15	500 LV	±4.5%
Rasmussen Reports/Pulse Opinion Research	April 3, 2012	Barack Obama	52%	Mitt Romney	36%	16	500 LV	±4.5%
Rasmussen Reports/Pulse Opinion Research	February 14, 2012	Barack Obama	55%	Rick Santorum	37%	18	500 LV	±4.5%
Rasmussen Reports/Pulse Opinion Research	February 14, 2012	Barack Obama	55%	Mitt Romney	36%	19	500 LV	±4.5%

Three way race

Poll source	Date administered	Democrat	%	Republican	%	Libertarian	%	Lead margin	Sample size	Margin of error
Public Policy Polling	July 13–16, 2012	Barack Obama	42%	Mitt Romney	38%	Gary Johnson	13%	4	724	±3.64%
Public Policy Polling	April 19–22, 2012	Barack Obama	48%	Mitt Romney	35%	Gary Johnson	15%	13	526	±4.3%

== New York ==
29 electoral votes
(Democratic in 2004) 58%–40%
(Democratic in 2008) 63%–36%

Poll source	Date administered	Democrat	%	Republican	%	Lead margin	Sample size	Margin of error
Siena College	August 14–19, 2012	Barack Obama	62%	Mitt Romney	33%	29	671 LV	±3.8%
Siena College	July 10–15, 2012	Barack Obama	61%	Mitt Romney	34%	27	758 RV	±3.6%
Siena College	June 3–6, 2012	Barack Obama	59%	Mitt Romney	35%	24	807 RV	±3.4%
Quinnipiac University	May 22–28, 2012	Barack Obama	56%	Mitt Romney	31%	25	1,504 RV	±2.5%
Siena College	May 6–10, 2012	Barack Obama	57%	Mitt Romney	37%	20	766 RV	±3.5%
NY1/YNN/Marist College	April 10–12, 2012	Barack Obama	57%	Mitt Romney	35%	22	632 RV	±4.0%
Siena College	April 1–4, 2012	Barack Obama	65%	Newt Gingrich	29%	36	808 RV	±3.4%
Siena College	April 1–4, 2012	Barack Obama	61%	Ron Paul	31%	30	808 RV	±3.4%
Siena College	April 1–4, 2012	Barack Obama	60%	Mitt Romney	35%	25	808 RV	±3.4%
Siena College	April 1–4, 2012	Barack Obama	62%	Rick Santorum	23%	39	808 RV	±3.4%
Quinnipiac University	March 28 – April 2, 2012	Barack Obama	56%	Mitt Romney	33%	23	1,597 RV	±2.5%
Quinnipiac University	March 28 – April 2, 2012	Barack Obama	59%	Rick Santorum	30%	29	1,597 RV	±2.5%
Siena College	February 26–29, 2012	Barack Obama	60%	Mitt Romney	34%	26	808 RV	±3.4%
Siena College	February 26–29, 2012	Barack Obama	64%	Rick Santorum	30%	34	808 RV	±3.4%
Siena College	February 26–29, 2012	Barack Obama	62%	Ron Paul	29%	33	808 RV	±3.4%
Siena College	February 26–29, 2012	Barack Obama	66%	Newt Gingrich	27%	39	808 RV	±3.4%
Quinnipiac University	February 8–13, 2012	Barack Obama	52%	Mitt Romney	35%	17	1,233 RV	±2.8%
Quinnipiac University	February 8–13, 2012	Barack Obama	57%	Newt Gingrich	31%	26	1,233 RV	±2.8%
Quinnipiac University	February 8–13, 2012	Barack Obama	53%	Rick Santorum	35%	18	1,233 RV	±2.8%

== North Carolina ==
15 electoral votes
(Republican in 2004) 56%–44%
(Democratic in 2008) 50%–49%

Poll source	Date administered	Democrat	%	Republican	%	Lead margin	Sample size	Margin of error
FOX 8/High Point University/SurveyUSA	August 26–30, 2012	Barack Obama	43%	Mitt Romney	46%	3	543 RV	±4.3%
Elon University	August 25–30, 2012	Barack Obama	43%	Mitt Romney	47%	4	1,089 LV	±3%
CNN/Time/Opinion Research Corporation	August 22–26, 2012	Barack Obama	47%	Mitt Romney	48%	1	766 LV	±3.5%
High Point University/SurveyUSA	August 18–23, 2012	Barack Obama	43%	Mitt Romney	43%	Tied	540 RV	±4.3%
Public Policy Polling	August 2–5, 2012	Barack Obama	49%	Mitt Romney	46%	3	813 LV	±3.4%
Rasmussen Reports/Pulse Opinion Research	August 1, 2012	Barack Obama	44%	Mitt Romney	49%	5	500 LV	±4.5%
Civitas Institute/National Research (R)	July 16–18, 2012	Barack Obama	48%	Mitt Romney	49%	1	600 RV	±4%
Public Policy Polling	July 5–8, 2012	Barack Obama	47%	Mitt Romney	46%	1	775 RV	±3.5%
Project New America/Myers Research (D)	July 1–8, 2012	Barack Obama	48%	Mitt Romney	49%	1	500 LV	±4.4%
Civitas Institute/SurveyUSA	June 29 – July 1, 2012	Barack Obama	45%	Mitt Romney	50%	5	558 RV	±4.2%
Rasmussen Reports/Pulse Opinion Research	June 25, 2012	Barack Obama	44%	Mitt Romney	47%	3	500 LV	±4.5%
NBC News/Marist College	June 24–25, 2012	Barack Obama	46%	Mitt Romney	44%	2	1,019 RV	±3.1%
Public Policy Polling	June 7–10, 2012	Barack Obama	46%	Mitt Romney	48%	2	810 RV	±3.4%
WRAL-TV Raleigh/SurveyUSA	May 18–21, 2012	Barack Obama	44%	Mitt Romney	45%	1	524 LV	±4.4%
Civitas Institute/National Research (R)	May 19–20, 2012	Barack Obama	45%	Mitt Romney	47%	2	600 RV	±4%
Rasmussen Reports/Pulse Opinion Research	May 14, 2012	Barack Obama	43%	Mitt Romney	51%	8	500 LV	±4.5%
Public Policy Polling	May 10–13, 2012	Barack Obama	48%	Mitt Romney	47%	1	666 RV	±3.8%
WRAL-TV Raleigh/Survey USA	April 26–30, 2012	Barack Obama	47%	Mitt Romney	43%	4	1,636 RV	±2.5%
Rasmussen Reports/Pulse Opinion Research	April 10, 2012	Barack Obama	44%	Mitt Romney	46%	2	500 LV	±4.5%
Public Policy Polling	April 4–7, 2012	Barack Obama	51%	Newt Gingrich	41%	10	975 RV	±3.1%
Public Policy Polling	April 4–7, 2012	Barack Obama	48%	Ron Paul	43%	5	975 RV	±3.1%
Public Policy Polling	April 4–7, 2012	Barack Obama	49%	Mitt Romney	44%	5	975 RV	±3.1%
Public Policy Polling	April 4–7, 2012	Barack Obama	50%	Rick Santorum	44%	6	975 RV	±3.1%
Public Policy Polling	March 8–11, 2012	Barack Obama	51%	Newt Gingrich	42%	9	804 RV	±3.5%
Public Policy Polling	March 8–11, 2012	Barack Obama	48%	Ron Paul	41%	7	804 RV	±3.5%
Public Policy Polling	March 8–11, 2012	Barack Obama	49%	Mitt Romney	46%	3	804 RV	±3.5%
Public Policy Polling	March 8–11, 2012	Barack Obama	49%	Rick Santorum	44%	5	804 RV	±3.5%
Public Policy Polling	February 3–5, 2012	Barack Obama	50%	Newt Gingrich	45%	5	1,052 RV	±3.0%
Public Policy Polling	February 3–5, 2012	Barack Obama	47%	Ron Paul	41%	6	1,052 RV	±3.0%
Public Policy Polling	February 3–5, 2012	Barack Obama	47%	Mitt Romney	46%	1	1,052 RV	±3.0%
Public Policy Polling	February 3–5, 2012	Barack Obama	48%	Rick Santorum	46%	2	1,052 RV	±3.0%
Civitas Institute/National Research (R)	January 9–11, 2012	Barack Obama	39%	Mitt Romney	48%	9	300 RV	±4.0%
Public Policy Polling	January 5–8, 2012	Barack Obama	46%	Mitt Romney	45%	1	780 RV	±3.5%
Public Policy Polling	January 5–8, 2012	Barack Obama	49%	Newt Gingrich	43%	6	780 RV	±3.5%
Public Policy Polling	January 5–8, 2012	Barack Obama	47%	Ron Paul	41%	6	780 RV	±3.5%
Public Policy Polling	January 5–8, 2012	Barack Obama	49%	Rick Perry	41%	8	780 RV	±3.5%
Public Policy Polling	January 5–8, 2012	Barack Obama	46%	Rick Santorum	46%	Tied	780 RV	±3.5%

Three way race

Poll source	Date administered	Democrat	%	Republican	%	Libertarian	%	Lead margin	Sample size	Margin of error
Public Policy Polling	May 10–13, 2012	Barack Obama	46%	Mitt Romney	44%	Gary Johnson	6%	2	666	±3.8%

== North Dakota ==
3 electoral votes
(Republican in 2004) 63%–36%
(Republican in 2008) 53%–45%

Poll source	Date administered	Democrat	%	Republican	%	Lead margin	Sample size	Margin of error
North Dakota Democratic-NPL State Party/DFM Research (D)	July 24–26, 2012	Barack Obama	35%	Mitt Romney	54%	19	400 LV	±4.9%
Rasmussen Reports/Pulse Opinion Research	July 10–11, 2012	Barack Obama	36%	Mitt Romney	51%	15	400	±5.0%
Mason-Dixon Polling & Research	June 4–6, 2012	Barack Obama	39%	Mitt Romney	52%	13	625 RV	±4.0%

== Ohio ==
18 electoral votes
(Republican in 2004) 51%–49%
(Democratic in 2008) 52%–47%

Poll source	Date administered	Democrat	%	Republican	%	Lead margin	Sample size	Margin of error
Capitol Correspondent/Gravis Marketing	August 27, 2012	Barack Obama	45.27%	Mitt Romney	44.39%	0.88	728 LV	±3.8%
Columbus Dispatch	August 15–25, 2012	Barack Obama	45%	Mitt Romney	45%	Tied	1,758 LV	±2.1%
CBS News/New York Times/Quinnipiac University	August 21, 2012	Barack Obama	50%	Mitt Romney	44%	6	1,253 LV	±2.8%
University of Cincinnati	August 16–21, 2012	Barack Obama	49%	Mitt Romney	46%	3	847 LV	±3.4%
Purple Strategies	August 13–14, 2012	Barack Obama	44%	Mitt Romney	46%	2	600 LV	±4.0%
Rasmussen Reports/Pulse Opinion Research	August 13, 2012	Barack Obama	45%	Mitt Romney	45%	Tied	500 LV	±4.5%
Public Policy Polling	August 9–12, 2012	Barack Obama	48%	Mitt Romney	45%	3	961 LV	±3.2%
Quinnipiac University	July 24–30, 2012	Barack Obama	50%	Mitt Romney	44%	6	1,193 LV	±3.0%
We Ask America	July 24, 2012	Barack Obama	47.84%	Mitt Romney	40.2%	7.64	1,115 LV	±3.0%
Opportunity Ohio/Magellan Strategies (R)	July 23–24, 2012	Barack Obama	45%	Mitt Romney	43%	2	597 LV	±4.01%
Rasmussen Reports/Pulse Opinion Research	July 18, 2012	Barack Obama	47%	Mitt Romney	45%	2	500 LV	±4.5%
Purple Strategies	July 9–13, 2012	Barack Obama	48%	Mitt Romney	45%	3	600 LV	±4.0%
Priorities USA Action/Garin-Hart-Yang Research Group (D)	June 25 – July 3, 2012	Barack Obama	48%	Mitt Romney	41%	7	608 LV	±4.0%
Quinnipiac University	June 19–25, 2012	Barack Obama	47%	Mitt Romney	38%	9	1,237 RV	±2.8%
Public Policy Polling	June 21–24, 2012	Barack Obama	47%	Mitt Romney	44%	3	673 RV	±3.8%
Purple Strategies	May 31 – June 5, 2012	Barack Obama	45%	Mitt Romney	48%	3	600 LV	±4.0%
Rasmussen Reports/Pulse Opinion Research	May 29, 2012	Barack Obama	44%	Mitt Romney	46%	2	500 LV	±4.5%
NBC News/Marist College	May 17–20, 2012	Barack Obama	48%	Mitt Romney	42%	6	1,103RV	±3.0%
Quinnipiac University	May 2–7, 2012	Barack Obama	45%	Mitt Romney	44%	1	1,069 RV	±3.0%
Public Policy Polling	May 3–6, 2012	Barack Obama	48%	Ron Paul	40%	8	875 RV	±3.3%
Public Policy Polling	May 3–6, 2012	Barack Obama	50%	Mitt Romney	43%	7	875 RV	±3.3%
Quinnipiac University	April 25 – May 1, 2012	Barack Obama	44%	Mitt Romney	42%	2	1,130 RV	±2.9%
Purple Strategies	April 19–23, 2012	Barack Obama	49%	Mitt Romney	44%	5	Not reported	±4.1%
Rasmussen Reports/Pulse Opinion Research	April 18, 2012	Barack Obama	46%	Mitt Romney	42%	4	500 LV	±4.5%
Fox News/Anderson Robbins/Shaw & Company	April 15–17, 2012	Barack Obama	45%	Mitt Romney	39%	6	606 RV	±4.0%
Rasmussen Reports/Pulse Opinion Research	March 26, 2012	Barack Obama	48%	Mitt Romney	40%	8	500 LV	±4.5%
Rasmussen Reports/Pulse Opinion Research	March 26, 2012	Barack Obama	47%	Rick Santorum	41%	6	500 LV	±4.5%
Quinnipiac University	March 20–26, 2012	Barack Obama	47%	Mitt Romney	41%	6	1,246 RV	±2.8%
Quinnipiac University	March 20–26, 2012	Barack Obama	47%	Rick Santorum	40%	7	1,246 RV	±2.8%
NBC News/Marist College	February 29 – March 2, 2012	Barack Obama	50%	Mitt Romney	38%	12	1573 RV	±2.5%
NBC News/Marist College	February 29 – March 2, 2012	Barack Obama	51%	Newt Gingrich	36%	15	1573 RV	±2.5%
NBC News/Marist College	February 29 – March 2, 2012	Barack Obama	48%	Ron Paul	38%	10	1505 RV	±2.5%
NBC News/Marist College	February 29 – March 2, 2012	Barack Obama	50%	Rick Santorum	36%	14	1505 RV	±2.5%
Fox News/Anderson Robbins/Shaw & Company	February 11–13, 2012	Barack Obama	38%	Mitt Romney	44%	6	505 RV	±4.5%
Fox News/Anderson Robbins/Shaw & Company	February 11–13, 2012	Barack Obama	43%	Newt Gingrich	37%	6	505 RV	±4.5%
Fox News/Anderson Robbins/Shaw & Company	February 11–13, 2012	Barack Obama	40%	Rick Santorum	43%	3	505 RV	±4.5%
Fox News/Anderson Robbins/Shaw & Company	February 11–13, 2012	Barack Obama	41%	Ron Paul	42%	1	505 RV	±4.5%
Quinnipiac University	February 7–12, 2012	Barack Obama	50%	Newt Gingrich	38%	12	1,421 RV	±2.6%
Quinnipiac University	February 7–12, 2012	Barack Obama	47%	Rick Santorum	41%	6	1,421 RV	±2.6%
Quinnipiac University	February 7–12, 2012	Barack Obama	46%	Ron Paul	40%	6	1,421 RV	±2.6%
Quinnipiac University	February 7–12, 2012	Barack Obama	46%	Mitt Romney	44%	2	1,421 RV	±2.6%
Rasmussen Reports/Pulse Opinion Research	February 8, 2012	Barack Obama	44%	Rick Santorum	44%	Tied	500 LV	±4.5%
Rasmussen Reports/Pulse Opinion Research	February 8, 2012	Barack Obama	45%	Mitt Romney	41%	4	500 LV	±4.5%
Public Policy Polling	January 28–29, 2012	Barack Obama	48%	Rick Santorum	42%	6	820 RV	±3.4%
Public Policy Polling	January 28–29, 2012	Barack Obama	51%	Newt Gingrich	39%	12	820 RV	±3.4%
Public Policy Polling	January 28–29, 2012	Barack Obama	48%	Ron Paul	38%	10	820 RV	±3.4%
Public Policy Polling	January 28–29, 2012	Barack Obama	49%	Mitt Romney	42%	7	820 RV	±3.4%
Quinnipiac University	January 9–16, 2012	Barack Obama	48%	Rick Santorum	37%	11	1,610 RV	±2.4%
Quinnipiac University	January 9–16, 2012	Barack Obama	52%	Newt Gingrich	38%	14	1,610 RV	±2.4%
Quinnipiac University	January 9–16, 2012	Barack Obama	48%	Ron Paul	39%	9	1,610 RV	±2.4%
Quinnipiac University	January 9–16, 2012	Barack Obama	44%	Mitt Romney	42%	2	1,610 RV	±2.4%

== Oklahoma ==
7 electoral votes
(Republican in 2004) 65.6%–34.4%
(Republican in 2008) 65.7%–34.4%

Poll source	Date administered	Democrat	%	Republican	%	Lead margin	Sample size	Margin of error
SoonerPoll	July 26 – August 14, 2012	Barack Obama	29%	Mitt Romney	58%	29	495 LV	±4.4%
SoonerPoll	May 7–10, 2012	Barack Obama	27%	Mitt Romney	62%	35	504 LV	±4.4%

== Oregon ==
7 electoral votes
(Democratic in 2004) 51%–47%
(Democratic in 2008) 57%–40%

Poll source	Date administered	Democrat	%	Republican	%	Lead margin	Sample size	Margin of error
PPP	June 21–24, 2012	Barack Obama	50%	Mitt Romney	42%	8	686	±3.7%
Survey USA	May 7–10, 2012	Barack Obama	47%	Mitt Romney	43%	4	1,468	±2.6%
Survey USA	March 14–19, 2012	Barack Obama	50%	Mitt Romney	39%	11	1,615	±2.5%
Survey USA	March 14–19, 2012	Barack Obama	54%	Newt Gingrich	34%	20	1,615	±2.5%
Survey USA	March 14–19, 2012	Barack Obama	49%	Rick Santorum	40%	9	1,615	±2.5%
Survey USA	March 14–19, 2012	Barack Obama	48%	Ron Paul	39%	9	1,615	±2.5%

== Pennsylvania ==
20 electoral votes
(Democratic in 2004) 51%–48%
(Democratic in 2008) 54%–44%

Poll source	Date administered	Democrat	%	Republican	%	Lead margin	Sample size	Margin of error
Philadelphia Inquirer/Global Strategy Group/National Research Inc.	August 21–23, 2012	Barack Obama	51%	Mitt Romney	42%	9	601 LV	±4%
Morning Call/Muhlenberg College	August 20–22, 2012	Barack Obama	49%	Mitt Romney	40%	9	422 LV	±5%
Franklin and Marshall College	August 7–12, 2012	Barack Obama	47%	Mitt Romney	42%	5	681 RV	±3.8%
Quinnipiac University	July 24–30, 2012	Barack Obama	53%	Mitt Romney	42%	11	1,168 LV	±3.0%
Public Policy Polling	July 21–23, 2012	Barack Obama	49%	Mitt Romney	43%	6	758 RV	±3.6%
Republican State Committee of Pennsylvania/Susquehanna Polling & Research Inc. (R)	July 19–23, 2012	Barack Obama	46%	Mitt Romney	43%	3	800 LV	±3.46%
Rasmussen Reports/Pulse Opinion Research	July 18, 2012	Barack Obama	48%	Mitt Romney	44%	4	500 LV	±4.5%
We Ask America	July 9–10, 2012	Barack Obama	47%	Mitt Romney	40%	7	1,227 LV	±2.8%
Priorities USA Action/Garin-Hart-Yang Research Group (D)	June 25 – July 3, 2012	Barack Obama	49%	Mitt Romney	40%	9	608 LV	±4.0%
Quinnipiac University	June 19–25, 2012	Barack Obama	45%	Mitt Romney	39%	6	1,252 RV	±2.8%
Quinnipiac University	June 5–10, 2012	Barack Obama	46%	Mitt Romney	40%	6	997 RV	±3.1%
Franklin & Marshall College	May 29 – June 4, 2012	Barack Obama	48%	Mitt Romney	36%	12	412 RV	±4.8%
Rasmussen Reports/Pulse Opinion Research	May 21, 2012	Barack Obama	47%	Mitt Romney	41%	6	500 LV	±4.5%
Public Policy Polling	May 17–20, 2012	Barack Obama	50%	Mitt Romney	42%	8	671 RV	±3.8%
Quinnipiac University	April 25 – May 1, 2012	Barack Obama	47%	Mitt Romney	39%	8	1,168 RV	±2.9%
Morning Call/Muhlenberg College	March 23 – April 1, 2012	Barack Obama	45%	Mitt Romney	40%	5	492 RV	±5%
Quinnipiac University	March 20–26, 2012	Barack Obama	45%	Mitt Romney	42%	3	1,232 RV	±2.8%
Quinnipiac University	March 20–26, 2012	Barack Obama	48%	Rick Santorum	41%	7	1,232 RV	±2.8%
Public Policy Polling	March 8–11, 2012	Barack Obama	49%	Mitt Romney	42%	7	689 RV	±4.1%
Public Policy Polling	March 8–11, 2012	Barack Obama	51%	Newt Gingrich	39%	12	689 RV	±4.1%
Public Policy Polling	March 8–11, 2012	Barack Obama	47%	Ron Paul	41%	6	689 RV	±4.1%
Public Policy Polling	March 8–11, 2012	Barack Obama	48%	Rick Santorum	46%	2	689 RV	±4.1%
Quinnipiac University	March 7–11, 2012	Barack Obama	46%	Mitt Romney	40%	6	1,256 RV	±2.8%
Quinnipiac University	March 7–11, 2012	Barack Obama	50%	Newt Gingrich	37%	13	1,256 RV	±2.8%
Quinnipiac University	March 7–11, 2012	Barack Obama	45%	Ron Paul	40%	5	1,256 RV	±2.8%
Quinnipiac University	March 7–11, 2012	Barack Obama	45%	Rick Santorum	44%	1	1,256 RV	±2.8%
Rasmussen Reports/Pulse Opinion Research	February 8–23, 2012	Barack Obama	45%	Mitt Romney	44%	1	438 LV	±4.5%
Rasmussen Reports/Pulse Opinion Research	February 8–23, 2012	Barack Obama	46%	Rick Santorum	40%	6	438 LV	±4.5%
Muhlenberg College/Morning Call	February 15–21, 2012	Barack Obama	48%	Mitt Romney	37%	11	625 RV	±4.0%
Muhlenberg College/Morning Call	February 15–21, 2012	Barack Obama	49%	Rick Santorum	41%	8	625 RV	±4.0%
Franklin & Marshall College	February 14–20, 2012	Barack Obama	41%	Mitt Romney	33%	8	592 RV	±4.0%
Franklin & Marshall College	February 14–20, 2012	Barack Obama	47%	Newt Gingrich	31%	16	592 RV	±4.0%
Franklin & Marshall College	February 14–20, 2012	Barack Obama	41%	Ron Paul	28%	13	592 RV	±4.0%
Franklin & Marshall College	February 14–20, 2012	Barack Obama	45%	Rick Santorum	37%	8	592 RV	±4.0%
Susquehanna Polling and Research	February 2–6, 2012	Barack Obama	43%	Mitt Romney	45%	2	800 RV	±3.46%
Susquehanna Polling and Research	February 2–6, 2012	Barack Obama	47%	Rick Santorum	43%	4	800 RV	±3.46%

== South Carolina ==
9 electoral votes
(Republican in 2004) 58%–41%
(Republican in 2008) 54%–45%

Poll source	Date administered	Democrat	%	Republican	%	Lead margin	Sample size	Margin of error
Reuters/Ipsos	January 10–13, 2012	Barack Obama	40%	Mitt Romney	46%	6	995 RV	±3.4%

== South Dakota ==
3 electoral votes
(Republican in 2004) 60%–38%
(Republican in 2008) 53%–45%

Poll source	Date administered	Democrat	%	Republican	%	Lead margin	Sample size	Margin of error
Nielson Brothers Polling	July 19–23, 2012	Barack Obama	43%	Mitt Romney	49%	6	546 LV	±4.19%

== Tennessee ==
11 electoral votes
(Republican in 2004) 57%–43%
(Republican in 2008) 57%–42%

Poll source	Date administered	Democrat	%	Republican	%	Lead margin	Sample size	Margin of error
Vanderbilt University/Princeton Survey Research Associates International	May 2–9, 2012	Barack Obama	40%	Mitt Romney	47%	7	826 RV	Not reported
Middle Tennessee State University	February 13–25, 2012	Barack Obama	40%	Newt Gingrich	45%	4	416 LV	±4.0%
Middle Tennessee State University	February 13–25, 2012	Barack Obama	41%	Ron Paul	44%	3	416 LV	±4.0%
Middle Tennessee State University	February 13–25, 2012	Barack Obama	41%	Mitt Romney	47%	6	416 LV	±4.0%
Middle Tennessee State University	February 13–25, 2012	Barack Obama	39%	Rick Santorum	51%	12	416 LV	±4.0%
Vanderbilt University/Princeton Survey Research Associates International	February 16–22, 2012	Barack Obama	41%	Newt Gingrich	38%	3	1,508 RV	±3%
Vanderbilt University/Princeton Survey Research Associates International	February 16–22, 2012	Barack Obama	39%	Ron Paul	40%	1	1,508 RV	±3%
Vanderbilt University/Princeton Survey Research Associates International	February 16–22, 2012	Barack Obama	39%	Mitt Romney	42%	3	1,508 RV	±3%
Vanderbilt University/Princeton Survey Research Associates International	February 16–22, 2012	Barack Obama	38%	Rick Santorum	42%	4	1,508 RV	±3%

== Texas ==
38 electoral votes
(Republican in 2004) 61%–38%
(Republican in 2008) 55%–44%

Poll source	Date administered	Democrat	%	Republican	%	Lead margin	Sample size	Margin of error
University of Texas/Texas Tribune/YouGov	May 7–13, 2012	Barack Obama	35%	Mitt Romney	55%	20	511	±4.34%
Public Policy Polling	April 19–22, 2012	Barack Obama	43%	Mitt Romney	50%	7	591 RV	±4.0%
Public Policy Polling	April 19–22, 2012	Barack Obama	45%	Newt Gingrich	47%	2	591 RV	±4.0%
Public Policy Polling	April 19–22, 2012	Barack Obama	43%	Ron Paul	47%	4	591 RV	±4.0%
University of Texas/Texas Tribune/YouGov	February 8–15, 2012	Barack Obama	38%	Newt Gingrich	49%	11	527 LV	±4.27%
University of Texas/Texas Tribune/YouGov	February 8–15, 2012	Barack Obama	36%	Mitt Romney	49%	13	529 LV	±4.26%
University of Texas/Texas Tribune/YouGov	February 8–15, 2012	Barack Obama	37%	Rick Santorum	51%	14	529 LV	±4.26%
University of Texas/Texas Tribune/YouGov	February 8–15, 2012	Barack Obama	35%	Ron Paul	44%	9	529 LV	±4.26%
Public Policy Polling	January 12–15, 2012	Barack Obama	47%	Newt Gingrich	45%	2	700 RV	±3.7%
Public Policy Polling	January 12–15, 2012	Barack Obama	40%	Ron Paul	46%	6	700 RV	±3.7%
Public Policy Polling	January 12–15, 2012	Barack Obama	47%	Rick Perry	48%	1	700 RV	±3.7%
Public Policy Polling	January 12–15, 2012	Barack Obama	42%	Mitt Romney	49%	7	700 RV	±3.7%
Public Policy Polling	January 12–15, 2012	Barack Obama	42%	Rick Santorum	49%	7	700 RV	±3.7%

Three way race

Poll source	Date administered	Democrat	%	Republican	%	Other candidates	%	Lead margin	Sample size	Margin of error
Public Policy Polling	January 12–15, 2012	Barack Obama	39%	Mitt Romney	47%	Gary Johnson	7%	8	700 RV	±3.7%
Public Policy Polling	January 12–15, 2012	Barack Obama	38%	Mitt Romney	40%	Ron Paul*	17%	2	700 RV	±3.7%

- – Ron Paul was running as a Republican candidate.

== Utah ==
6 electoral votes
(Republican in 2004) 72%–26%
(Republican in 2008) 62%–34%

Poll source	Date administered	Democrat	%	Republican	%	Lead margin	Sample size	Margin of error
Deseret News/KSL-TV/Dan Jones & Associates	June 21, 2012	Barack Obama	26%	Mitt Romney	68%	42	1,222 RV	±2.8%

== Vermont ==
3 electoral votes
(Democratic in 2004) 59%–39%
(Democratic in 2008) 67%–30%

Poll source	Date administered	Democrat	%	Republican	%	Lead margin	Sample size	Margin of error
Castleton University	August 11–21, 2012	Barack Obama	62%	Mitt Romney	25%	37	477 RV	±4.5%
WDEV/WCAX/Vermont Business Magazine/Castleton University	May 7–16, 2012	Barack Obama	59.3%	Mitt Romney	27.5%	31.8	607 RV	±4.0%
Castleton University	February 11–22, 2012	Barack Obama	57%	Mitt Romney	31%	26	800 RV	±3.5%
Castleton University	February 11–22, 2012	Barack Obama	59%	Rick Santorum	30%	29	800 RV	±3.5%
Castleton University	February 11–22, 2012	Barack Obama	58%	Ron Paul	28%	30	800 RV	±3.5%

== Virginia ==
13 electoral votes
(Republican in 2004) 54%–46%
(Democratic in 2008) 53%–46%

Poll source	Date administered	Democrat	%	Republican	%	Lead margin	Sample size	Margin of error
Rasmussen Reports/Pulse Opinion Research	August 23, 2012	Barack Obama	47%	Mitt Romney	47%	Tied	500 LV	±4.5%
Public Policy Polling	August 16–19, 2012	Barack Obama	50%	Mitt Romney	45%	5	855 LV	±3.4%
Purple Strategies	August 13–14, 2012	Barack Obama	45%	Mitt Romney	48%	3	600 LV	±4.0%
Rasmussen Reports/Pulse Opinion Research	August 7, 2012	Barack Obama	48%	Mitt Romney	46%	2	500 LV	±4.5%
CBS News/New York Times/Quinnipiac University	July 31 – August 6, 2012	Barack Obama	49%	Mitt Romney	45%	4	1,412 LV	±2.6%
Rasmussen Reports/Pulse Opinion Research	July 16–17, 2012	Barack Obama	47%	Mitt Romney	46%	1	500 LV	±4.5%
Quinnipiac University	July 10–16, 2012	Barack Obama	44%	Mitt Romney	44%	Tied	1,673 RV	±2.4%
Purple Strategies	July 9–13, 2012	Barack Obama	46%	Mitt Romney	44%	2	600 LV	±4.0%
Public Policy Polling	July 5–8, 2012	Barack Obama	50%	Mitt Romney	42%	8	647 RV	±3.9%
Priorities USA Action/Garin-Hart-Yang Research Group	June 25 – July 3, 2012	Barack Obama	46%	Mitt Romney	43%	3	608 LV	±4%
We Ask America	June 25, 2012	Barack Obama	43.3%	Mitt Romney	48.0%	4.7	1,106 LV	±2.95%
Virginian Pilot/Old Dominion University	May 16 – June 15, 2012	Barack Obama	49%	Mitt Romney	42%	7	776 RV	±3.5%
Purple Strategies	May 31 – June 5, 2012	Barack Obama	49%	Mitt Romney	46%	3	600 LV	±4.0%
Quinnipiac University	May 30 – June 4, 2012	Barack Obama	47%	Mitt Romney	42%	5	1,282 RV	±2.7%
Rasmussen Reports/Pulse Opinion Research	June 3, 2012	Barack Obama	47%	Mitt Romney	47%	Tied	500 LV	±4.5%
NBC News/Marist College	May 17–20, 2012	Barack Obama	48%	Mitt Romney	44%	4	1,076 RV	±3.0%
Washington Post	April 28 – May 2, 2012	Barack Obama	51%	Mitt Romney	44%	7	964 RV	±4%
Public Policy Polling	April 26–29, 2012	Barack Obama	53%	Newt Gingrich	37%	16	680 RV	±3.8%
Public Policy Polling	April 26–29, 2012	Barack Obama	50%	Ron Paul	39%	11	680 RV	±3.8%
Public Policy Polling	April 26–29, 2012	Barack Obama	51%	Mitt Romney	43%	8	680 RV	±3.8%
Rasmussen Reports/Pulse Opinion Research	April 23, 2012	Barack Obama	44%	Mitt Romney	45%	1	500 LV	±4.5
Purple Strategies	April 19–23, 2012	Barack Obama	48%	Mitt Romney	46%	2	Not reported	±4.1%
Roanoke College	March 26 – April 5, 2012	Barack Obama	40%	Mitt Romney	46%	6	603 A	±4%
Rasmussen Reports/Pulse Opinion Research	March 20, 2012	Barack Obama	51%	Mitt Romney	42%	9	500 LV	±4.5%
Quinnipiac University	March 13–18, 2012	Barack Obama	50%	Mitt Romney	42%	8	1,034 RV	±3.1%
Quinnipiac University	March 13–18, 2012	Barack Obama	54%	Newt Gingrich	35%	19	1,034 RV	±3.1%
Quinnipiac University	March 13–18, 2012	Barack Obama	49%	Rick Santorum	40%	9	1,034 RV	±3.1%
Quinnipiac University	March 13–18, 2012	Barack Obama	49%	Ron Paul	39%	10	1,034 RV	±3.1%
NBC News/Marist College	February 29 – March 2, 2012	Barack Obama	52%	Mitt Romney	35%	17	1,273 RV	±2.8%
NBC News/Marist College	February 29 – March 2, 2012	Barack Obama	57%	Newt Gingrich	31%	26	1,273 RV	±2.8%
NBC News/Marist College	February 29 – March 2, 2012	Barack Obama	54%	Rick Santorum	32%	22	1,245 RV	±2.8%
NBC News/Marist College	February 29 – March 2, 2012	Barack Obama	53%	Ron Paul	32%	21	1,245 RV	±2.8%
Roanoke College	February 13–26, 2012	Barack Obama	48%	Newt Gingrich	37%	11	607 A	±4%
Roanoke College	February 13–26, 2012	Barack Obama	45%	Rick Santorum	39%	6	607 A	±4%
Roanoke College	February 13–26, 2012	Barack Obama	45%	Ron Paul	35%	10	607 A	±4%
Roanoke College	February 13–26, 2012	Barack Obama	42%	Mitt Romney	43%	1	607 A	±4%
Rasmussen Reports/Pulse Opinion Research	February 21, 2012	Barack Obama	49%	Mitt Romney	43%	6	500 LV	±4.5%
Rasmussen Reports/Pulse Opinion Research	February 21, 2012	Barack Obama	51%	Rick Santorum	43%	8	500 LV	±4.5%
Richmond Times-Dispatch/Muhlenberg College/Christopher Newport University	February 4–13, 2012	Barack Obama	45%	Newt Gingrich	40%	5	1,018 RV	±3.1%
Richmond Times-Dispatch/Muhlenberg College/Christopher Newport University	February 4–13, 2012	Barack Obama	43%	Mitt Romney	46%	2	1,018 RV	±3.1%
Richmond Times-Dispatch/Muhlenberg College/Christopher Newport University	February 4–13, 2012	Barack Obama	42%	Rick Santorum	46%	4	1,018 RV	±3.1%
Richmond Times-Dispatch/Muhlenberg College/Christopher Newport University	February 4–13, 2012	Barack Obama	43%	Ron Paul	43%	Tie	1,018 RV	±3.1%
Quinnipiac University	February 1–6, 2012	Barack Obama	47%	Mitt Romney	43%	4	1,544 RV	±2.5%
Quinnipiac University	February 1–6, 2012	Barack Obama	51%	Newt Gingrich	37%	14	1,544 RV	±2.5%
Quinnipiac University	February 1–6, 2012	Barack Obama	49%	Rick Santorum	41%	8	1,544 RV	±2.5%
Quinnipiac University	February 1–6, 2012	Barack Obama	47%	Ron Paul	40%	7	1,544 RV	±2.5%
Mason-Dixon Polling & Research	January 16–18, 2012	Barack Obama	45%	Mitt Romney	44%	1	625 RV	±3.9%
Mason-Dixon Polling & Research	January 16–18, 2012	Barack Obama	49%	Newt Gingrich	38%	11	625 RV	±3.9%

Three way race

Poll source	Date administered	Democrat	%	Republican	%	Constitution Party	%	Lead margin	Sample size	Margin of error
Public Policy Polling	July 5–8, 2012	Barack Obama	49%	Mitt Romney	35%	Virgil Goode	9%	14	647	±3.9%
Public Policy Polling	April 26–29, 2012	Barack Obama	50%	Mitt Romney	38%	Virgil Goode	5%	12	680	±3.8%

== Washington ==
12 electoral votes
(Democratic in 2004) 53%–46%
(Democratic in 2008) 57%–40%

Poll source	Date administered	Democrat	%	Republican	%	Lead margin	Sample size	Margin of error
Moore Information	August 6–7, 2012	Barack Obama	46%	Mitt Romney	36%	10	500 LV	±4%
KING-TV Seattle/SurveyUSA	August 2–3, 2012	Barack Obama	54%	Mitt Romney	37%	17	524 LV	±4.4%
KING-TV Seattle/SurveyUSA	July 16–18, 2012	Barack Obama	46%	Mitt Romney	37%	9	630 RV	±4%
Public Policy Polling	June 14–17, 2012	Barack Obama	54%	Mitt Romney	41%	13	1,073 RV	±3.0%
Elway Research	June 13–16, 2012	Barack Obama	49%	Mitt Romney	41%	8	408 RV	±5%
KING-TV Seattle/SurveyUSA	May 8–9, 2012	Barack Obama	50%	Mitt Romney	36%	14	557 RV	±4.2%
Public Policy Polling	February 16–19, 2012	Barack Obama	55%	Newt Gingrich	35%	20	1,264 RV	±2.76%
Public Policy Polling	February 16–19, 2012	Barack Obama	53%	Mitt Romney	38%	15	1,264 RV	±2.76%
Public Policy Polling	February 16–19, 2012	Barack Obama	51%	Ron Paul	38%	13	1,264 RV	±2.76%
Public Policy Polling	February 16–19, 2012	Barack Obama	52%	Rick Santorum	40%	12	1,264 RV	±2.76%
KING-TV Seattle/SurveyUSA	February 13–15, 2012	Barack Obama	56%	Newt Gingrich	34%	22	572 RV	±4.2%
KING-TV Seattle/SurveyUSA	February 13–15, 2012	Barack Obama	50%	Mitt Romney	39%	11	572 RV	±4.2%
KING-TV Seattle/SurveyUSA	February 13–15, 2012	Barack Obama	50%	Ron Paul	37%	13	572 RV	±4.2%
KING-TV Seattle/SurveyUSA	February 13–15, 2012	Barack Obama	51%	Rick Santorum	38%	13	572 RV	±4.2%

== West Virginia ==
5 electoral votes
(Republican in 2004) 56%–43%
(Republican in 2008) 56%–43%

Poll source	Date administered	Democrat	%	Republican	%	Lead margin	Sample size	Margin of error
R.L. Repass & Partners	August 22–25, 2012	Barack Obama	38%	Mitt Romney	52%	14	401 LV	±4.9%
R.L. Repass & Partners	April 25–28, 2012	Barack Obama	37%	Mitt Romney	54%	17	410 RV	±4.8%

== Wisconsin ==
10 electoral votes
(Democratic in 2004) 50%–49%
(Democratic in 2008) 56%–42%

Poll source	Date administered	Democrat	%	Republican	%	Lead margin	Sample size	Margin of error
CBS News/New York Times/Quinnipiac University	August 15–21, 2012	Barack Obama	49%	Mitt Romney	47%	2	1,190 LV	±3%
Marquette Law School	August 16–19, 2012	Barack Obama	49%	Mitt Romney	46%	3	576 LV	±4.2%
Public Policy Polling	August 16–19, 2012	Barack Obama	47%	Mitt Romney	48%	1	1,308 LV	±2.7%
Rasmussen Reports/Pulse Opinion Research	August 15, 2012	Barack Obama	47%	Mitt Romney	48%	1	500 LV	±4.5%
CNN/Opinion Research Corporation	August 13–14, 2012	Barack Obama	49%	Mitt Romney	45%	4	920 RV	±3.0%
CBS News/New York Times/Quinnipiac University	July 31 – August 6, 2012	Barack Obama	51%	Mitt Romney	45%	6	1,428	±2.6%
Marquette Law School	August 2–5, 2012	Barack Obama	50%	Mitt Romney	45%	5	1,188 LV	±2.9%
Rasmussen Reports/Pulse Opinion Research	July 25, 2012	Barack Obama	49%	Mitt Romney	46%	3	500 LV	±4.5%
We Ask America	July 17–18, 2012	Barack Obama	49%	Mitt Romney	42%	7	1,162 LV	±2.93%
Marquette Law School	July 5–8, 2012	Barack Obama	51%	Mitt Romney	43%	8	810 LV	±3.5%
Public Policy Polling	July 5–8, 2012	Barack Obama	50%	Mitt Romney	44%	6	1,057 LV	±3.3%
Marquette Law School	June 13–16, 2012	Barack Obama	49%	Mitt Romney	43%	6	594 LV	±4.1%
Rasmussen Reports/Pulse Opinion Research	June 12, 2012	Barack Obama	44%	Mitt Romney	47%	3	500 LV	±4.5%
We Ask America	June 3, 2012	Barack Obama	48%	Mitt Romney	43%	5	1,275 LV	±2.75%
Marquette Law School	May 23–26, 2012	Barack Obama	51%	Mitt Romney	43%	8	600 LV	±4%
St. Norbert College	May 17–22, 2012	Barack Obama	49%	Mitt Romney	43%	6	406 LV	±5.0%
Daily Kos/Public Policy Polling	May 11–13, 2012	Barack Obama	47%	Mitt Romney	46%	1	851 RV	±3.4%
Marquette Law School	May 9–12, 2012	Barack Obama	46%	Mitt Romney	46%	Tied	600 LV	±4.1%
Rasmussen Reports/Pulse Opinion Research	May 9, 2012	Barack Obama	49%	Mitt Romney	45%	4	500 LV	±4.5%
Marquette Law School	April 26–29, 2012	Barack Obama	51%	Mitt Romney	42%	9	705 RV	±3.8%
Daily Kos/Public Policy Polling	April 13–15, 2012	Barack Obama	50%	Mitt Romney	44%	6	1,136 RV	±2.9%
Rasmussen Reports/Pulse Opinion Research	March 27, 2012	Barack Obama	56%	Newt Gingrich	31%	25	500 LV	±4.5%
Rasmussen Reports/Pulse Opinion Research	March 27, 2012	Barack Obama	52%	Mitt Romney	41%	11	500 LV	±4.5%
NBC News/Marist College	March 22–27, 2012	Barack Obama	52%	Mitt Romney	35%	17	1,391 RV	±2.6%
NBC News/Marist College	March 22–27, 2012	Barack Obama	51%	Rick Santorum	38%	13	1,391 RV	±2.6%
NBC News/Marist College	March 22–27, 2012	Barack Obama	51%	Rick Santorum	39%	12	1,400 RV	±2.6%
NBC News/Marist College	March 22–27, 2012	Barack Obama	51%	Ron Paul	36%	15	1,400 RV	±2.6%
Marquette Law School	March 22–25, 2012	Barack Obama	48%	Mitt Romney	43%	5	707 RV	±3.7%
Marquette Law School	March 22–25, 2012	Barack Obama	51%	Rick Santorum	39%	12	707 RV	±3.7%
Marquette Law School	March 22–25, 2012	Barack Obama	53%	Newt Gingrich	36%	17	707 RV	±3.7%
Marquette Law School	March 22–25, 2012	Barack Obama	50%	Ron Paul	40%	10	707 RV	±3.7%
Rasmussen Reports/Pulse Opinion Research	February 27, 2012	Barack Obama	47%	Mitt Romney	42%	5	500 LV	±4.5%
Rasmussen Reports/Pulse Opinion Research	February 27, 2012	Barack Obama	46%	Rick Santorum	41%	5	500 LV	±4.5%
Public Policy Polling	February 23–26, 2012	Barack Obama	55%	Newt Gingrich	37%	18	900 RV	±3.27%
Public Policy Polling	February 23–26, 2012	Barack Obama	53%	Ron Paul	37%	16	900 RV	±3.27%
Public Policy Polling	February 23–26, 2012	Barack Obama	53%	Mitt Romney	39%	14	900 RV	±3.27%
Public Policy Polling	February 23–26, 2012	Barack Obama	49%	Rick Santorum	43%	6	900 RV	±3.27%
Marquette Law School	February 16–19, 2012	Barack Obama	53%	Mitt Romney	38%	15	716 RV	±3.7%
Marquette Law School	February 16–19, 2012	Barack Obama	51%	Rick Santorum	40%	11	716 RV	±3.7%
Marquette Law School	February 16–19, 2012	Barack Obama	56%	Newt Gingrich	33%	23	716 RV	±3.7%
Marquette Law School	February 16–19, 2012	Barack Obama	52%	Ron Paul	36%	16	716 RV	±3.7%
Marquette Law School	January 19–22, 2012	Barack Obama	48%	Mitt Romney	40%	8	701 RV	±3.8%

Three way race

Poll source	Date administered	Democrat	%	Republican	%	Libertarian	%	Lead margin	Sample size	Margin of error
Reason-Rupe	May 14–18, 2012	Barack Obama	46%	Mitt Romney	36%	Gary Johnson	6%	10	708	±3.7%

== See also ==
- Statewide opinion polling for the 2012 United States presidential election
- Pre-2012 statewide opinion polling for the 2012 United States presidential election
- Nationwide opinion polling for the 2012 United States presidential election
- Nationwide opinion polling for the 2012 Republican Party presidential primaries
- Statewide opinion polling for the 2012 Republican Party presidential primaries
- Statewide opinion polling for the 2008 United States presidential election
- 2012 Republican Party presidential primaries
