= Enriqueta González Baz =

Mexican mathematician (1915–2002)

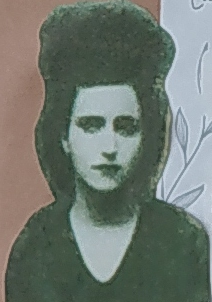
Enriqueta González Baz

Enriqueta González Baz y de la Vega (September 22, 1915 – December 22, 2002) was a Mexican mathematician, a co-founder of the Mexican Mathematical Society, and the first woman to earn a degree in mathematics at the National Autonomous University of Mexico in 1944.

== Early life ==
Enriqueta González Baz was born in Mexico City on Calle de Correo Mayor on September 22, 1915. She attended Escuela número 8 for women where she studied to become a teacher. After completing secondary school, her father, Roberto González Baz, sent her to a two-year program at the Escuela Doméstica for domestic studies. Her father believed that above all, his daughters should be women: learn how to cook, tend the house, etc.

At this school, one of her teachers, Elena Picazo de Murray, recognized González Baz's talent for studying, so she urged her to pursue higher education.

== Education ==
After finishing domestic school, González Baz enrolled in night classes at the former San Ildefonso College while studying at the Escuela Nacional de Maestros in Mexico City where she earned a teaching credential to become a school teacher. She then enrolled in the National Preparatory School, where she studied physical sciences and mathematics.

After graduating high school, she enrolled at the Faculty of Sciences of the National Autonomous University of Mexico. She was part of the first cohorts of students majoring in mathematics, which also included Manuela Garín. In 1944, she became the first woman at National Autonomous University of Mexico and in Mexico to earn a degree in mathematics. She wrote a thesis on Special Functions (Bessel, Gamma, and Legendre) and completed postgraduate studies at Bryn Mawr College in Philadelphia, Pennsylvania.

== Career and contributions ==
During this time, the Ministry of Public Education in Mexico did not distinguish between the title of a mathematician and a mathematics teacher, so González Baz became a high school math teacher. She taught mathematics at the National Preparatory School and various other secondary schools.

She also taught mathematics at the Faculty of Sciences and was a researcher at the Institute of Physics at the National Autonomous University of Mexico. Among her mathematical works, she translated Solomon Lefschetz's 1930 textbook Topology.

== Legacy ==
González Baz was one of the five founding women of the Mexican Mathematical Society. She is regarded as a distinguished student and professor of mathematics.

González Baz died on December 22, 2002, "leaving an open door for the next generations of women attracted to the study of mathematics."
