= Priorities USA Action =

Democratic Party super PAC

Priorities USA
- Legal status: Active
- Headquarters: Washington, D.C.
- Affiliations: Democratic Party
- Website: priorities.org

Priorities USA Action is a super PAC associated with the Democratic Party. Founded in 2011, it supported Barack Obama's 2012 re-election campaign. It was the primary super PAC supporting Hillary Clinton's 2016 presidential campaign and Joe Biden's 2020 presidential campaign. In the 2020 presidential election, Priorities USA Action spent the third highest amount of all outside spending groups. It focuses mainly on high-dollar donors; former New York City Mayor Michael Bloomberg is a major donor to the group.

In 2023, Priorities USA Action announced that it would not run any television advertisements in the 2024 election cycle; it would instead reshape itself into a digital political strategy operation. The group announced plans to spend $75 million on digital efforts supportive of Joe Biden and other Democrats in the 2024 election. The New York Times reported that "because of its size, the organization is essentially without peer."

A 2024 investigation by Sludge found that the Priorities USA Foundation, which is a tax-exempt 501(c)(3) charity, has been raising millions of dollars and funneling that money to its affiliated 501(c)(4) political arm, Priorities USA. In 2022, the Priorities USA Foundation moved $10 million, or 96% of the money it had raised, to its political arm. According to Sludge, this type of activity represents a "glaring loophole with current rules regulating nonprofits."

== History ==
=== Barack Obama ===
The super PAC was founded in 2011 by former Obama campaign officials Bill Burton and Sean Sweeney to raise funds from wealthy donors, including corporations and unions, and support the re-election of President Barack Obama. As per FEC rules established in the wake of the Citizens United Supreme Court decision, the group is legally prohibited from coordinating with the candidate or his or her campaign. The group is led by Guy Cecil, who was the political director for Hillary Clinton's 2008 presidential bid. The Board of Directors includes Cecil, Jim Messina, Charles A. Baker III, Allida Black, David Brock, Maria Echaveste, Justin Gray, William P. Hite, Stephanie Schriock, Marva Smalls, Joe Solomonese, Greg Speed, and Randi Weingarten.

Its key backers in 2012 included Paul Begala, Teddy Johnston, Geoff Garin, Ellen Malcolm, Jeffrey Katzenberg, Bill Maher, Mary Beth Cahill, and Irwin M. Jacobs.

On August 7, 2012, Priorities USA Action put out an ad titled Understands, which "offers one man's story to suggest the investment practices of Romney and Bain Capital led to the early death of his wife". The man, Joe Soptic, explains that after the GST Steel plant was shut down, he lost his job and health insurance for him and his family which led to his wife's death from cancer. Politifact rated the claim made in the ad false, noting that the ad "uses innuendo for a serious allegation, but there's no proof directly linking the death to Bain". Factcheck.org found the ad to be "misleading on several accounts", including that Soptic's wife died "five years after the plant closed". Factcheck.org also points out that, when the plant closed, she had her own employer-sponsored coverage which she lost two years later and, furthermore, that Romney was running the 2002 Winter Olympics when the plant closed.

=== Hillary Clinton ===
In 2014, the organization began to focus efforts on raising funds to help Hillary Clinton in her 2016 presidential campaign. Jim Messina and Jennifer Granholm (former Governor of Michigan) were drafted to serve as co-chairs of the organization. Granholm resigned in August 2015 to join Correct the Record, another pro-Clinton super PAC. As of September 2016, it had amassed $132 million in support of Clinton. The top six donors to the super PAC have given $43.5 million, which is a third of the money collected by Priorities USA Action in the 2016 election cycle. The super PAC raised $21.7 million in August 2016, marking its largest monthly fundraising haul.

The group was headed by David Brock from 2014 until his resignation in February 2015.

In 2016, the Center for Public Integrity (CPI) called Priorities USA Action "the 2016 presidential election's most powerful super PAC." In the lead up to the 2016 U.S. presidential election, it aired over 36,000 television advertisements, all of them attacking Donald Trump in his race against Hillary Clinton. As a super PAC, Priorities USA Action is allowed to raise unlimited amounts of money from individuals, corporations, and labor unions. Super PACs are not allowed to coordinate spending with candidates it is seeking to aid. Hillary Clinton helped the group raise money "while also trying to distance herself from it as she touts campaign finance reform." CPI wrote that "Everyday Americans are not fueling this super PAC: Just 33 Priorities USA Action donors— who each have donated at least $1 million — account for 90 percent" of the group's $110 million haul from January 2015 through July 2016. Top donors include Donald Sussman, George Soros, James Simons, S. Daniel Abraham, Haim Saban, and Cheryl Saban.

=== Joe Biden ===
In 2020, after remaining neutral in the highly contested 2020 Democratic Party presidential primaries, Priorities USA endorsed Joe Biden after his apparent delegate lead from the Super Tuesday primaries.

In 2024, the group began paying social media influencers to post pro-Biden content on social media, including Tik Tok and Instagram. According to Politico, "with few federal regulations over campaign advertising on social media, each platform sets its own rules" which "appear to be poorly enforced."

== See also ==
- Ready PAC
- Correct the Record
- American Bridge 21st Century
