= Greg Speed =

US wheelchair athlete

Personal information
- Born: 1970 (age 54–55) Fairfield, California, United States
- Home town: Fort Worth, Texas

Sport
- Country: United States
- Sport: Paralympic athletics
- Disability: Paraplegia

Gregory "Greg" Speed (born 1970) is a US former wheelchair track and field athlete who competed in the 1992 Summer Paralympics in Barcelona, Spain.

Speed broke the US national record in the 100m class T-4 race in 1990 IWAS World Games and the world record in the 4 × 100 m class T-4 relay race a year later. He is a member of the Southwest Chapter of the Olympians and Paralympians organization.

As well as track and field, Speed went at UT Arlington in 1988 to study for an aerospace engineering degree, he graduated in 1995 and worked as an engineer at Lockheed Martin Missiles and Fire Control for five years. He focussed on working full-time on his own web-consulting and IT business in 2000 and he became the owner and operator of Speedsoft, a firm that consults on web design, information technology and online marketing services.
