= Manuela Garín =

Spanish and Mexican mathematician

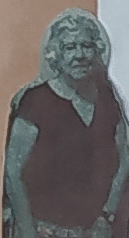
Manuela Garín

Manuela (Mane) Garín Pinillos de Álvarez (1 January 1914 – 30 April 2019) was a Spanish-born and Cuban-raised mathematician who became one of the first women to study mathematics at the National Autonomous University of Mexico (UNAM). She has been named as a pioneer of mathematics in Mexico.

== Personal life ==
Garín was born on 1 January 1914 in Asturias, Spain. Her mother and step-father escaped World War I by moving to Cuba, where she was home-taught by her step-father, an engineer for a mining company. After several years, they moved to Pinar del Río in Cuba, where she first entered formal schooling. In the economic and political crisis in Cuba under the reign of Gerardo Machado, the family began working for the political opposition but in 1932, in fear for their lives, moved to Mexico, using counterfeit Spanish passports. In Mexico, she became an activist in the Communist Party.

She married Raúl Álvarez, an engineer. Their son, Raúl Álvarez Garín (1914–2014), was also a prominent activist, one of the leaders in the Mexican Movement of 1968 and later a professor of economics at UNAM. Although initially studying mathematics, their daughter Tania Álvarez Garín became a ballerina and choreographer.

== Academic career ==
Once in Mexico, Garín caught up on the Mexican school curriculum through the Colegio Motolinía. But, because her Cuban education had omitted singing and sports, she was blocked from entering the Escuela Nacional Preparatoria until her family obtained an exception with the assistance of the Cuban ambassador to Mexico. She studied chemistry there, encouraged by her mother to aim for career as a pharmacist, as engineering work was not open to women at that time. However, she was encouraged to study mathematics by one of her teachers, Alfonso Nápoles Gándara.

There was at that time an arrangement that ENP chemistry students could enter the science program at UNAM, but Garín had to overcome bureaucratic opposition to her entry, which she did in 1937 with the intervention of geophysicist Ricardo Monges López, entering alongside Enriqueta González Baz, and becoming the first women in the UNAM Faculty of Sciences.

After graduating, marrying, living with her husband in Sinaloa and Ensenada, and then teaching at the Monterrey Institute of Technology and Higher Education for several years, she joined the UNAM Faculty of Engineering in 1951, and in 1952 began teaching as well in the Faculty of Sciences. She also worked as a researcher in the UNAM Institute of Geophysics, led by Monges. In this time, she also completed a master's thesis in probability theory, supervised by Remigio Valdés. As a professional mathematician, Garín specialized in applied mathematics involving the mathematical modeling of the Earth's magnetic field; she also worked on secondary-school mathematics education.

In her later work, she helped found the Institute of Geophysics in the Universidad Autónoma de Yucatán and in 1964 became the founding director of the School of Advanced Studies of the Universidad de Sonora. She retired as a professor emerita of the Faculty of Engineering of UNAM in 1989.

== Recognition ==
In 2020, a science contest for primary and secondary school girls was named in honor of Garín by the government of Mexico City.
