= Oleg Garin =

Oleg Garin may refer to:

- Oleg Garin (footballer) (1966–2026), Russian professional football player and coach
- Oleg Garin (politician) (born 1973), Russian politician and motocross rider
