= Garin, Iran =

Garin گارين
- Village
- Location within Iran
- Coordinates: 28°13′39″N 58°49′23″E
- Country: Iran
- Province: Kerman
- County: Rigan
- Bakhsh: Central
- Rural District: Gavkan

Population (2006)
  - Total: 85
- Time zone: UTC+3:30 (IRST)
  - Summer (DST): UTC+4:30 (IRDT)

Garin (Persian: گارين, also Romanized as Gārīn) is a village in Gavkan Rural District, in the Central District of Rigan County, Kerman Province, Iran. At the 2006 census, its population was 85, in 16 families.
