= Hernán Garín =

Italian-Argentine footballer

Hernán Garin
Personal information
- Full name: Hernán Pablo Garín
- Date of birth: 24 October 1983 (age 43)
- Place of birth: Concordia, Argentina
- Position: Midfielder

Team information
- Current team: ASD Ca De Rissi SG

Senior career*
Years	Team	Apps	(Gls)
2004	San Miguel		
2005	Defensores de Belgrano		
2005–2006	Temperley		
2006	Ituzaingó		
2007–2008	Corridonia		(21)
2008–2009	Città di Castello	30	(12)
2009–2012	Savona		(14)
2012–2013	Virtus Entella	39	(8)
2013–2014	Lavagnese		(3)
2014	Gozzano		(1)
2015–2016	AC Cuneo		(4)
2016	Città di Baveno	12	(9)
2017-2018	UniPomezia	10	(2)
2021-2022	Moconesi	22	(24)
2022-2023	Segesta	25	(15)
2023-2024	Calvarese	27	(15)
2024-	Ca de Rissi	27	(22)
- * Club domestic league appearances and goals as of 16 April 2015

Hernán Pablo Garín (born 24 October 1983) is an Italian Argentine footballer who plays for club ASD Ca de Rissi SG.

== Biography ==
In 2007, he left for Italian amateur side Corridonia. In 2008, he left for Città di Castello. That season there were 3 teams from that town to compete in Eccellenza Umbria and Garin's AC Città di Castello finished as a mid-table team.

In August 2009 he was signed by Serie D team Savona. He scored 8 league goals for the Serie D Group A champion.

On 11 January 2012, he joined Virtus Entella.

From 2020/2021 Season he joined Andrea Doria Calcio, an amatorial club in Aics Liguria League

== Honours ==
- Serie D: 2010 (Savona)
