= Geoff Garin =

American pollster (born 1953)

Geoff Garin (born 1953) is an American pollster, who served as co-chief strategist for the latter part of Senator Hillary Clinton's 2008 Presidential campaign and was part of the polling team for Kamala Harris in the 2024 election. He was a pollster and strategist in 2011–2012 for Priorities USA Action, a superPAC that supported Barack Obama's reelection, and served in those same roles for Priorities USA the 2016 and 2020 elections.

Garin graduated from Harvard University in 1975. He is the husband of Debbie Berkowitz, with whom he has two sons, Andy (b. 1987) and Danny (b. 1990) Garin.

== Hart Research ==
Garin is the president of Hart Research Associates, a survey research firm. He became president of Hart Research in 1984, after having worked in the firm since 1978 as a senior analyst and vice president.
