= Eugene Garin =

Russian painter

Eugene Garin (30 November 1922, Odesa, Ukrainian Soviet Socialist Republic – 14 June 1994, California, United States) was a contemporary seascape artist. Born in Odesa, Ukraine, part of the USSR at the time, Garin was best known for his rendition of transparent waves. Influenced by the Russian painter Peter Effremovich Fedatov during his youth and later by the works of I. K. Aivazowsky, Garin combined traditional European styles with contemporary techniques to compose his paintings. With a career lasting over four decades, he was well respected for his seascape painting techniques that were difficult to replicate.

Using translucent glazes to layer textures, Garin created bold compositions of a variety of subjects including shipwreck scenes, moonlit ocean breakers, seascapes at dusk, and misty coastal coves. The sea is often a commanding force in his paintings, with the artist intending to impact the viewers emotions through his depictions of strong waves.

Considered the patriarch of modern seascape art, his paintings hang in many major collections throughout the globe, including Canada, England, South Africa, Japan, Mexico and Russia. He is listed in Who's Who in California and the American Art Analog. His artwork is in the permanent collection of the Russian consulate in San Francisco along with the Presidential Palace in Panama.
