= Garin, Haute-Garonne =

Garin
- Commune
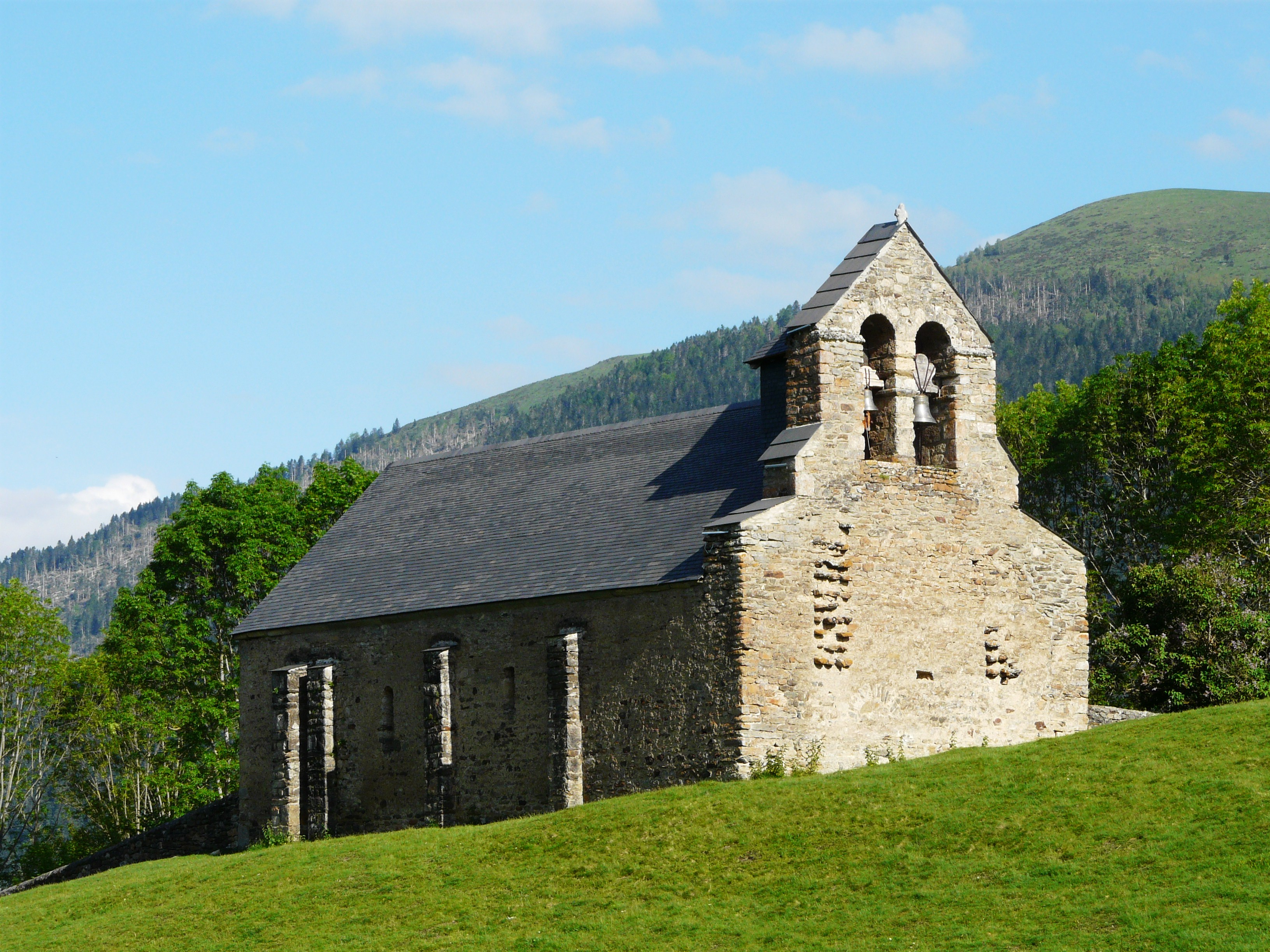
- The chapel of La Moraine in Garin
- Location of Garin
- Location within France Location within Occitanie
- Coordinates: 42°48′36″N 0°31′01″E
- Country: France
- Region: Occitania
- Department: Haute-Garonne
- Arrondissement: Saint-Gaudens
- Canton: Bagnères-de-Luchon

Government
  - Mayor (2020–2026): Patrick Duplan
- Area^{1}: 5.62 km^{2} (2.17 sq mi)
- Elevation: 1,100 m (3,600 ft)
- Highest elevation: 2,003 m (6,572 ft)
- Lowest elevation: 1,027 m (3,369 ft)
- Population (2023): 146
  - Density: 26.0/km^{2} (67.3/sq mi)
- Time zone: UTC+01:00 (CET)
  - Summer (DST): UTC+02:00 (CEST)
- INSEE/Postal code: 31213 /31110
- ^{1} French Land Register data, which excludes lakes, ponds, glaciers > 1 km^{2} (0.386 sq mi or 247 acres) and river estuaries.

Garin (French pronunciation: [ɡaʁɛ̃]) is a commune in the Haute-Garonne department in southwestern France.

== Population ==
Historical population
Year	Pop.	±% p.a.
1968	108	—
1975	108	+0.00%
1982	108	+0.00%
1990	108	+0.00%
1999	102	−0.63%
2007	137	+3.76%
2012	134	−0.44%
2017	145	+1.59%
2023	146	+0.11%
Source: INSEE

== See also ==
- Communes of the Haute-Garonne department
