= Mark Squier =

Media consultant

- Occupation: Media consultant
- Employer(s): Purple Strategies; McMahon Squier and Associates
- Known for: Principal partner at Purple Strategies

Mark Squier is an American strategic advisor and media consultant who has worked for Democratic candidates including Howard Dean, Ann Richards, and Robert Weygand. He is a founding partner of the media consulting firm McMahon Squier and Associates and is also a founding partner of Purple Strategies, a bipartisan communications firm.

== Early life ==
Mark Squier is the son of media consultant Bob Squier. As a teenager, Squier was introduced to his father's profession when he was hired by his father to carry and transport camera equipment for various political campaigns.

== Career ==
=== Early political work ===
In 1978, Squier worked with his father on Bob Graham's campaign for governor of Florida and was later hired as lead producer at Squier/Eskew Communications, a firm his father helped found. During his time with his father's firm, Squier produced advertisements for local and national candidates including former Texas Governor Ann Richards, then-Tennessee Senator Al Gore, Iowa Senator Tom Harkin and Connecticut Senator Joe Lieberman.

=== McMahon Squier and Associates ===
In 1991, Squier left Squier/Eskew Communications and co-founded Trippi McMahon and Squier, a media consulting firm, with Steve McMahon and Joe Trippi. The firm worked on local, national, and international political campaigns including that of Greek Prime Minister Andreas Papandreou in 1993. Three years later, the firm produced advertisements for the senatorial campaigns of Ron Wyden of Oregon, Mark Warner of Virginia, and John Kitzhaber's campaign for governor of Oregon. Also in 1996, Squier worked with Robert Weygand on his successful congressional primary campaign against fellow Democrat Joe Paolino, who had hired Squier's father Bob Squier as a media consultant.

Squier's firm also worked with John Baldacci, including producing advertisements for his 2002 campaign for governor of Maine. In 2004, Squier, along with his partner McMahon, were hired as senior political strategists for former Vermont Governor Howard Dean's presidential campaign. The same year, the Media Fund hired Squier's firm to be its lead advertising agency. Two years later, the firm developed advertisements for John Sarbanes' congressional campaign in Maryland.

During the mid-2000s, Squier's firm changed names several times. In 2004, Joe Trippi left the firm, which was then renamed McMahon Squier and Associates. From 2007 to 2008, John Lapp joined the firm as a partner and the firm's name was changed to McMahon Squier Lapp and Associates. Following Lapp's departure, the firm returned to the name McMahon Squier and Associates.

Other clients of Squier's firm include the Democratic Congressional Campaign Committee in both 2006 and 2008, and the House Majority Super PAC in 2012.

=== Purple Strategies ===
In 2008, Squier became a founding partner at Purple Strategies, a bipartisan communications firm located in Alexandria, Virginia. Other founding partners include Alex Castellanos, Bruce Haynes, and Steve McMahon. Current and former Purple Strategies clients include BP, Time Warner Cable, the Pharmaceutical Research and Manufacturers of America, and the United States Chamber of Commerce.

== Other activities ==
Squier received his master's degree in film from the American Film Institute in Los Angeles. His thesis film, "The Blue Men", was the recipient of an Emmy and a Student Academy Award in 1990.

Squier was a co-executive producer of the 2008 Democratic National Convention.
