= Steve McMahon (consultant) =

American lawyer and media consultant

- Education: University of Nebraska–Lincoln; University of Iowa College of Law
- Occupation: Media consultant
- Employer(s): Purple Strategies; McMahon Squier and Associates
- Known for: Media consultant for Howard Dean's presidential campaign

Steve McMahon is an American lawyer and media consultant who has worked on political campaigns for Democratic candidates including Ted Kennedy, Howard Dean, and Dick Gephardt, in addition to his work with elected officials. He is a founding partner of Purple Strategies, a bipartisan communications firm located in Alexandria, Virginia, and McMahon Squier and Associates, a media consulting firm.

== Career ==
=== Early career ===
Steve McMahon trained as an attorney, graduating from the University of Nebraska–Lincoln and the University of Iowa College of Law. He helped with Senator Ted Kennedy's 1980 presidential campaign before starting his professional career as an assistant press secretary in Kennedy's Senate office. He later became a deputy director of Kennedy's political action committee, the Fund for a Democratic Majority. In 1987, he transitioned into media consulting when he was hired as a vice president at Doak, Shrum and Associates, an Arlington, Virginia-based media consulting firm. While at the firm his notable work included consulting for Dick Gephardt's 1988 presidential campaign and other political campaigns.

=== McMahon Squier and Associates ===
In 1991, McMahon co-founded the media consulting firm Trippi McMahon and Squier with Mark Squier and Joe Trippi. McMahon's early work for the firm included a role as media strategist for California governor Jerry Brown's 1992 presidential campaign. Throughout the 1990s and 2000s, McMahon and his partners worked on all five of Howard Dean's gubernatorial campaigns. McMahon was also a strategist and consultant for Dean's 2004 campaign for the US presidency. Following Dean's departure from the race, McMahon's firm served as the lead advertising partner for the Media Fund, which produced ads in support of then-Senator John Kerry's presidential campaign. After the 2004 presidential election, McMahon worked on Dean's successful 2005 campaign for chairman of the Democratic National Committee.

In addition to leading Trippi McMahon and Squier, in 1999 McMahon and his partners also established a second company, Issue & Image, which focused on advocacy advertising.

During the 2008 election cycle, McMahon produced advertisements for the Democratic National Committee in support of Barack Obama's presidential campaign. He also worked as a senior media consultant for the 2008 Democratic National Convention, which was co-produced by his partner Mark Squier.

McMahon's firm went through several name changes in the mid to late 2000s, including following the departure of Joe Trippi in 2004. From 2009 onwards, the firm has been called McMahon Squier and Associates.

=== Purple Strategies ===
In 2008, McMahon merged Issue & Image, the advocacy advertising firm established in 1999, with Republican Alex Castellanos' firm National Media Public Affairs, to form the communications firm Purple Strategies. McMahon and Castellanos had often met each other while pitching to clients and decided to form Purple Strategies as a bipartisan consultancy, blending their "blue" and "red" political backgrounds. Other founding partners of the Alexandria, Virginia-based firm include Bruce Haynes and Mark Squier. At Purple Strategies, McMahon has worked with BP, PhRMA and the United States Chamber of Commerce. Other clients of the firm include Time Warner Cable, Coca-Cola and McDonald's.

== Other activities ==
In addition to his role as a consultant, McMahon is a regular guest commentator on television and has appeared on Today, Good Morning America, Meet the Press, MSNBC's Hardball with Chris Matthews and Andrea Mitchell Reports not to mention frequent appearances on C-SPAN's morning call-in show, Washington Journal.
