= Rats (advertisement) =

American political advertisement

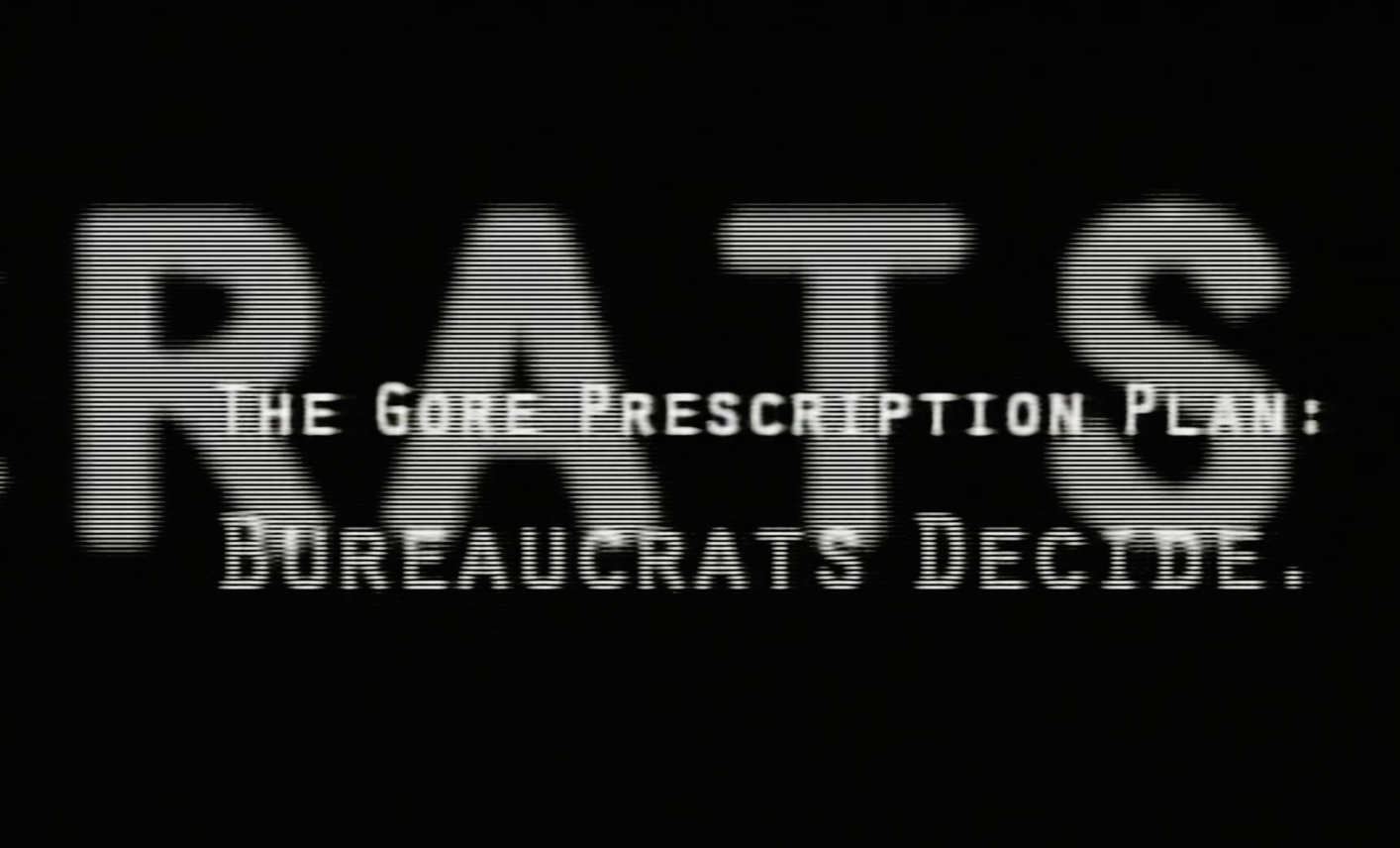
- Frame accused of using subliminal messaging
- Client: Republican National Committee; George W. Bush 2000 presidential campaign
- Running time: 30 seconds
- Release date: August 2000
- Produced by: Alex Castellanos
- Country: United States

"Priority", commonly known as "Rats", was a political advertisement commissioned by the Republican National Committee during the 2000 United States presidential election. The advertisement criticized Democratic nominee Al Gore's proposal to add a prescription drug benefit to Medicare, claiming that the plan would let "bureaucrats decide" the type of coverage Medicare participants receive. As the word "bureaucrats" was displayed on the screen, the word "rats" appeared in all caps for approximately one-thirtieth of a second.

The advertisement was pulled from live television after Democrats, including Gore's campaign, claimed that it used subliminal messaging to associate Gore with the word "rats". Both the Republican National Committee and Republican presidential nominee George W. Bush rejected assertions that subliminal messaging was used, with the latter calling the claims "bizarre and weird".

Prior to being pulled, the advertisement aired 4,400 times on 179 television stations in 33 U.S. cities for over two weeks, at a total cost of $2.5 million.

== Background ==
The 30-second advertisement, officially titled "Priority", was produced by Republican media consultant Alex Castellanos for the Republican National Committee (RNC) during the 2000 United States presidential election. It criticized Democratic nominee Al Gore's proposal to add a prescription drug benefit to Medicare, claiming that the plan would place healthcare decisions in the hands of bureaucrats. The commercial began airing in late August 2000, as part of a $2.5 million RNC advertising campaign in 33 U.S. states.

During the ad, while a narrator criticized Gore's plan, the word "bureaucrats" appeared on screen in large white capital letters. Before the full word became visible, the word "rats", written in all caps, occupied most of the screen for a single video frame (approximately one-thirtieth of a second). The "rats" frame was first identified by a Seattle-based man who notified his local Democratic Party, which in turn alerted Gore's campaign.

The advertisement was subsequently pulled from live television after running for more than two weeks. Castellanos initially denied that the word "rats" had been intentionally inserted, describing it as a byproduct of the advertisement's graphic design, but later admitted that the word was "a visual drumbeat designed to make you look at the word bureaucrats."

== Reception ==
On September 12, 2000, Gore's campaign publicly accused the RNC of using subliminal advertising techniques. Gore referred to the advertisement as a "subliminal message" throughout the remainder of the campaign, while Democratic vice presidential nominee Joe Lieberman called the ad "very disappointing and strange". Republican presidential nominee George W. Bush dismissed the Gore campaign's allegations as "bizarre and weird". The RNC denied the advertisement contained a subliminal message.

Darrell West, a political science professor at Brown University, stated that the word "rats" was "so carefully superimposed" that the word's inclusion had to be intentional. Political scientist Lynn Vavreck agreed, telling BBC News that "[s]omeone made this frame specifically". After learning of the ad, The New York Times interviewed multiple advertising professionals, nearly all of whom concluded that it would be "virtually impossible" to have not seen the word "rats" during production. Advertising executive Jennifer Solow described the ad as "effective ... yet evil".

== FCC investigation ==
On September 13, 2000, Federal Communications Commission (FCC) chairman William Kennard announced that the agency would seek information from television stations that had aired the advertisement, after Democratic senators Ron Wyden of Oregon and John Breaux of Louisiana requested the commission investigate the possible usage of subliminal messaging.

The FCC revealed that of the 179 television stations that broadcast the advertisement, 17 stated that they noticed the word "rats" being flashed across the screen before airing it. The FCC declined to penalize any of the stations or continue the investigation, instead stating that they had "made no determination in th[e] matter".

== Research ==
In 2008, researchers Joel Weinberger and Drew Westen conducted a study in which participants were asked to rate a candidate. Weinberger and Westen showed participants an image of the candidate, with one of four short phrases (RATS, STAR, ARAB, or XXXX) appearing on the screen for six-thousandths of a second immediately beforehand. The participants were then made to read 10 statements, such as "This candidate looks competent", and choose whether they agreed or disagreed.

For survey responses phrased in a negative manner, such as "I dislike this candidate", participants exposed to the word "rats" viewed the candidate in a significantly worse light than those who viewed the other three subliminal messages. The negative effect after seeing the word "rats" was equal among both genders and political affiliations.
