= Stolow =

Stolow is a surname. Notable people with the surname include:

- Albert Stolow (born 1959), Canadian physical and theoretical chemist
- Henry Stolow (1901–1971), Latvian stamp dealer who did business in the United States and Germany

== See also ==
- Solow
