= Opinion polling for the 2016 Republican Party presidential primary in New Hampshire =

This article contains opinion polling in New Hampshire for the 2016 Republican Party presidential primaries. The shading for each poll indicates the candidate(s) which are within one margin of error of the poll's leader.

== Polling ==
Winner: Donald Trump

Primary date: February 9, 2016

Poll source	Date	1st	2nd	3rd	Other
Primary results	February 9, 2016	Donald Trump; 35.23%	John Kasich; 15.72%	Ted Cruz; 11.63%	Jeb Bush 10.96%, Marco Rubio 10.52%, Chris Christie 7.38%, Carly Fiorina 4.12%, Ben Carson 2.28%, Rand Paul 0.68%, Mike Huckabee 0.08%, Rick Santorum 0.06%, Jim Gilmore 0.05%
ARG Margin of error: ± 5.0% Sample size: 418	February 7–8, 2016	Donald Trump; 33%	John Kasich; 17%	Marco Rubio; 14%	Ted Cruz 10%, Jeb Bush 9%, Chris Christie 8%, Carly Fiorina 3%, Ben Carson 1%, Undecided 6%
CNN/UNH/WMUR Margin of error: ± 5.2% Sample size: 362	February 4–8, 2016	Donald Trump; 31%	Marco Rubio; 17%	Ted Cruz; 14%	John Kasich 10%, Jeb Bush 7%, Carly Fiorina 5%, Chris Christie 4%, Ben Carson 3%, Undecided 7%
Gravis Marketing/ One America News Margin of error: ± 3.7% Sample size: 705	February 7, 2016	Donald Trump; 28%	John Kasich; 17%	Marco Rubio; 15%	Jeb Bush 14%, Ted Cruz 11%, Chris Christie 6%, Carly Fiorina 5%, Ben Carson 3%, Rand Paul 1%, Rick Santorum 0.5%
ARG Margin of error: ± 5.0% Sample size: 427	February 6–7, 2016	Donald Trump; 30%	John Kasich; 16%	Marco Rubio; 16%	Ted Cruz 10%, Jeb Bush 9%, Chris Christie 6%, Carly Fiorina 3%, Ben Carson 1%, Undecided 9%
UMass Lowell/7 News Margin of error: ± 5.13% Sample size: 464	February 5–7, 2016	Donald Trump; 34%	Marco Rubio; 13%	Ted Cruz; 13%	Jeb Bush 10%, John Kasich 10%, Chris Christie 5%, Carly Fiorina 4%, Ben Carson 3%, Undecided 9%
Emerson College Margin of error: ± 3.7% Sample size: 686	February 4–7, 2016	Donald Trump; 31%	Jeb Bush; 16%	John Kasich; 13%	Marco Rubio 12%, Ted Cruz 11%, Carly Fiorina 7%, Chris Christie 6%, Ben Carson 3%,
ARG Margin of error: ± 5.0% Sample size: 422	February 5–6, 2016	Donald Trump; 31%	John Kasich; 17%	Marco Rubio; 17%	Ted Cruz 9%, Jeb Bush 9%, Chris Christie 5%, Carly Fiorina 2%, Ben Carson 1%, Undecided 8%
Monmouth University Margin of error: ± 4.4% Sample size: 508	February 4–6, 2016	Donald Trump; 30%	John Kasich; 14%	Marco Rubio; 13%	Jeb Bush 13%, Ted Cruz 12%, Chris Christie 6%, Carly Fiorina 5%, Ben Carson 4%, Other 1%, Undecided 3%
UMass Lowell/7 News Margin of error: ± 4.82% Sample size: 516	February 4–6, 2016	Donald Trump; 36%	Marco Rubio; 14%	Ted Cruz; 13%	Jeb Bush 10%, John Kasich 9%, Chris Christie 4%, Carly Fiorina 4%, Ben Carson 3%, Undecided 7%
CNN/UNH/WMUR Margin of error: ± 5.2% Sample size: 362	February 3–6, 2016	Donald Trump; 33%	Marco Rubio; 16%	Ted Cruz; 14%	John Kasich 11%, Jeb Bush 7%, Carly Fiorina 6%, Chris Christie 4%, Ben Carson 2%, Someone Else 1%, Not Sure 6%
Franklin Pierce University/ RKM/Boston Herald Margin of error: ± 4.7% Sample size: 433	February 2–6, 2016	Donald Trump; 31%	Ted Cruz; 16%	Marco Rubio; 15%	John Kasich 11%, Jeb Bush 10%, Chris Christie 5%, Carly Fiorina 4%, Ben Carson 3%, Other 2%, Unsure 3%
ARG Margin of error: ± 5.0% Sample size: 415	February 4–5, 2016	Donald Trump; 34%	John Kasich; 17%	Marco Rubio; 16%	Ted Cruz 9%, Jeb Bush 8%, Chris Christie 5%, Carly Fiorina 2%, Ben Carson 2%, Undecided 6%
UMass Lowell/7 News Margin of error: ± 4.86% Sample size: 501	February 3–5, 2016	Donald Trump; 35%	Marco Rubio; 14%	Ted Cruz; 13%	John Kasich 10%, Jeb Bush 10%, Chris Christie 4%, Ben Carson 3%, Carly Fiorina 3%, Undecided 9%
Suffolk University/ Boston Globe Margin of error: ± 4.4% Sample size: 500	February 3–4, 2016	Donald Trump; 28.8%	Marco Rubio; 19.4%	John Kasich; 13%	Jeb Bush 9.8%, Ted Cruz 6.6%, Chris Christie 5.2%, Ben Carson 4.4%, Carly Fiorina 3.8%, Other 1%, Undecided 8%
ARG Margin of error: ± 5.0% Sample size: 420	February 3–4, 2016	Donald Trump; 36%	Marco Rubio; 15%	John Kasich; 14%	Ted Cruz 12%, Jeb Bush 8%, Chris Christie 6%, Carly Fiorina 2%, Ben Carson 2%, Undecided 6%
MassINC/WBUR Margin of error: ± 4.9% Sample size: 410	February 2–4, 2016	Donald Trump; 29%	Marco Rubio; 12%	Ted Cruz; 12%	Jeb Bush 9%, John Kasich 9%, Carly Fiorina 8%, Chris Christie 6%, Ben Carson 4%, Jim Gilmore <1% Other <1%, Won't Vote 1%, Don't Know 5%
UMass Lowell/7 News Margin of error: ± 4.8% Sample size: 500	February 2–4, 2016	Donald Trump; 34%	Marco Rubio; 15%	Ted Cruz; 14%	Jeb Bush 8%, John Kasich 8%, Chris Christie 5%, Ben Carson 4%, Carly Fiorina 3%, Other 2%, Undecided 6%
CNN/UNH/WMUR Margin of error: ± 6.8% Sample size: 209	February 2–4, 2016	Donald Trump; 29%	Marco Rubio; 18%	Ted Cruz; 13%	John Kasich 12%, Jeb Bush 10%, Chris Christie 4%, Carly Fiorina 4%, Ben Carson 2%, Jim Gilmore 0%, Someone Else 2%, Not Sure 8%
NBC News/WSJ/Marist Margin of error: ± 3.8% Sample size: 653	February 2–3, 2016	Donald Trump; 30%	Marco Rubio; 17%	Ted Cruz; 15%	John Kasich 10%, Jeb Bush 9%, Chris Christie 4%, Ben Carson 4%, Carly Fiorina 2%, Other 1%, Undecided 7%
ARG Margin of error: ± 5.0% Sample size: 600	February 2–3, 2016	Donald Trump; 34%	Marco Rubio; 14%	John Kasich; 13%	Ted Cruz 12%, Jeb Bush 8%, Chris Christie 4%, Carly Fiorina 4%, Ben Carson 2%, Undecided 8%
UMass Lowell/7 News Margin of error: ± 4.87% Sample size: 487	February 1–3, 2016	Donald Trump; 36%	Marco Rubio; 15%	Ted Cruz; 14%	Jeb Bush 8%, John Kasich 7%, Chris Christie 5%, Ben Carson 4%, Carly Fiorina 3%, Other 8%
Harper Polling Margin of error: ± 4.75% Sample size: 425	February 1–2, 2016	Donald Trump; 31%	Jeb Bush; 14%	John Kasich; 12%	Marco Rubio 10%, Ted Cruz 9%, Chris Christie 6%, Carly Fiorina 5%, Ben Carson 3%, Rand Paul 3%, Rick Santorum 0%, Mike Huckabee 0%, Jim Gilmore 0%, Undecided 8%
UMass Lowell/7 News Margin of error: ± 4.8% Sample size: 502	January 31– February 2, 2016	Donald Trump; 38%	Ted Cruz; 14%	Marco Rubio; 12%	Jeb Bush 9%, John Kasich 7%, Chris Christie 6%, Ben Carson 3%, Carly Fiorina 3%, Rand Paul 2%, Rick Santorum 0%, Other 2%, Unsure 4%
UMass Amherst/ WBZ-TV/YouGov Margin of error: ± 7.1% Sample size: 390	January 29– February 2, 2016	Donald Trump; 35%	Marco Rubio; 15%	John Kasich; 11%	Ted Cruz 9%, Jeb Bush 8%, Chris Christie 5%, Ben Carson 4%, Carly Fiorina 3%, Other 8%, Unsure 3%
ARG Margin of error: ± 4.0% Sample size: 600	January 29–31, 2016	Donald Trump; 34%	John Kasich; 16%	Marco Rubio; 11%	Ted Cruz 10%, Jeb Bush 9%, Chris Christie 6%, Rand Paul 2%, Carly Fiorina 2%, Ben Carson 2%, Rick Santorum 1%, Mike Huckabee 0%, Undecided 6%
UMass Lowell/7 News Margin of error: ± 5.1% Sample size: 461	January 29–31, 2016	Donald Trump; 38%	Ted Cruz; 12%	John Kasich; 9%	Jeb Bush 9%, Marco Rubio 8%, Chris Christie 7%, Rand Paul 3%, Ben Carson 3%, Carly Fiorina 2%, Rick Santorum 1%, Mike Huckabee 0%, Other 2%, Not Sure 5%
CNN/UNH/WMUR Margin of error: ± 4.8% Sample size: 409	January 27–30, 2016	Donald Trump; 30%	Ted Cruz; 12%	Marco Rubio; 11%	John Kasich 9%, Chris Christie 8%, Jeb Bush 6%, Carly Fiorina 4%, Rand Paul 3%, Ben Carson 3%, Mike Huckabee 1%, Jim Gilmore 0%, Rick Santorum 0%, Other 3%, Not Sure 10%
Franklin Pierce/RKM/ Boston Herald Margin of error: ± 4.7% Sample size: 439	January 26–30, 2016	Donald Trump; 38%	Ted Cruz; 13%	Jeb Bush; 10%	Marco Rubio 10%, John Kasich 8%, Chris Christie 5%, Carly Fiorina 5%, Rand Paul 5%, Ben Carson 3%, Mike Huckabee 1%, Rick Santorum 0%, Other 2%, Unsure 2%
Suffolk University Margin of error: ± 4.4% Sample size: 500	January 25–27, 2016	Donald Trump; 26.6%	John Kasich; 12%	Ted Cruz; 11.8%	Jeb Bush 11.2%, Marco Rubio 9.6%, Chris Christie 5.6%, Ben Carson 4.8%, Carly Fiorina 4%, Rand Paul 1.6%, Mike Huckabee 0.4%, Jim Gilmore 0.2%, Rick Santorum 0%, Other 0.4%, Undecided 11.8%
Adrian Gray; Consulting Margin of error: ± 4% Sample size: 583	January 25–27, 2016	Donald Trump; 27%	Marco Rubio; 15%	Ted Cruz; 13%	John Kasich 12%, Jeb Bush 11%, Chris Christie 6%, Rand Paul 4%, Ben Carson 3%, Carly Fiorina 2%, Mike Huckabee 1%, Rick Santorum 0%, Don't know 5%
Emerson College Margin of error: ± 5.0% Sample size: 373	January 25–26, 2016	Donald Trump; 35%	Jeb Bush; 18%	John Kasich; 14%	Marco Rubio 9%, Ted Cruz 8%, Chris Christie 5%, Carly Fiorina 3%, Ben Carson 3%, Rand Paul 3%, Mike Huckabee 1%, Rick Santorum 0%, Jim Gilmore 0%, Other 0%, Undecided 1%
ARG Margin of error: ± 4.0% Sample size: 600	January 23–25, 2016	Donald Trump; 31%	John Kasich; 17%	Ted Cruz; 12%	Marco Rubio 9%, Chris Christie 8%, Jeb Bush 8%, Carly Fiorina 3%, Rand Paul 2%, Ben Carson 2%, Mike Huckabee 1%, Rick Santorum 1%, Jim Gilmore 0%, Other 1%, Undecided 6%
Franklin Pierce/RKM/Boston Herald Margin of error: ± 4.7% Sample size: 444	January 20–24, 2016	Donald Trump; 33%	Ted Cruz; 14%	John Kasich; 12%	Jeb Bush 9%, Marco Rubio 8%, Chris Christie 7%, Carly Fiorina 5%, Ben Carson 4%, Rand Paul 3%, Mike Huckabee 1%, Rick Santorum 0%, Other 1%, Unsure 3%
NBC/WSJ/Marist Margin of error: ± 4.0% Sample size: 612	January 17–23, 2016	Donald Trump; 31%	Ted Cruz; 12%	Marco Rubio/ John Kasich; 11%	Jeb Bush 8%, Chris Christie 7%, Ben Carson 5%, Carly Fiorina 4%, Rand Paul 4%, Mike Huckabee 1%, Other 1%, Undecided 5%
Fox News Margin of error: ± 5.0% Sample size: 401	January 19–21, 2016	Donald Trump; 31%	Ted Cruz; 14%	Marco Rubio; 13%	John Kasich 9%, Chris Christie 7%, Jeb Bush 7%, Rand Paul 5%, Ben Carson 5%, Carly Fiorina 3%, Mike Huckabee 1%, None of the above 1%, Don't know 5%
CBS/YouGov Margin of error: ± 6.2% Sample size: 476	January 19–21, 2016	Donald Trump; 34%	Ted Cruz; 16%	Marco Rubio; 14%	John Kasich 10%, Chris Christie 7%, Jeb Bush 7%, Ben Carson 5%, Carly Fiorina 4%, Rand Paul 3%, Mike Huckabee 0%, Rick Santorum 0%, Jim Gilmore 0%, No Preference 0%
ARG Margin of error: ± 4.0% Sample size: 600	January 15–18, 2016	Donald Trump; 27%	John Kasich; 20%	Marco Rubio; 10%	Ted Cruz 9%, Chris Christie 9%, Jeb Bush 8%, Rand Paul 5%, Carly Fiorina 2%, Ben Carson 2%, Mike Huckabee 1%, Rick Santorum 1%, Jim Gilmore 0%, Other 1%, Undecided 7%
CNN/UNH/WMUR Margin of error: ± 4.8% Sample size: 414	January 13–18, 2016	Donald Trump; 34%	Ted Cruz; 14%	Marco Rubio; 10%	Jeb Bush 10%, Rand Paul 6%, Chris Christie 6%, John Kasich 6%, Carly Fiorina 4%, Ben Carson 3%, Mike Huckabee 1%, Rick Santorum 0%, Don't know 6%
Mason-Dixon/AARP Margin of error: ± 4.5% Sample size: 503	January 12–16, 2016	Donald Trump; 32%	Marco Rubio; 14%	John Kasich; 13%	Chris Christie 10%, Jeb Bush 9%, Ted Cruz 8%, Carly Fiorina 6%, Ben Carson 2%, Rand Paul 2%, Mike Huckabee 1%, Rick Santorum 0%, Undecided 4%
ARG Margin of error: ± 4.0% Sample size: 600	January 7–10, 2016	Donald Trump; 25%	Marco Rubio/ John Kasich; 14%	Chris Christie; 10%	Ted Cruz 9%, Jeb Bush 8%, Rand Paul 4%, Carly Fiorina 3%, Ben Carson 2%, Mike Huckabee 1%, Rick Santorum 1%, Jim Gilmore 0%, Other 0%, Undecided 8%
Monmouth University Margin of error: ± 4.8% Sample size: 414	January 7–10, 2016	Donald Trump; 32%	John Kasich/ Ted Cruz; 14%	Marco Rubio; 12%	Chris Christie 8%, Carly Fiorina 5%, Jeb Bush 4%, Rand Paul 4%, Ben Carson 3%, Mike Huckabee 1%, Rick Santorum 0%, Other 0%, Undecided 3%
NBC/WSJ/Marist Margin of error: ± 4.1% Sample size: 569	January 2–7, 2016	Donald Trump; 30%	Marco Rubio; 14%	Chris Christie; 12%	Ted Cruz 10%, John Kasich 9%, Jeb Bush 9%, Rand Paul 5%, Ben Carson 4%, Carly Fiorina 3%, Mike Huckabee <1%, Other <1%, Undecided 5%
NH1/Reach Margin of error: ± 3.1% Sample size: 1000	January 7, 2016	Donald Trump; 31.7%	Jeb Bush; 11.9%	John Kasich 11.8%	Chris Christie 11.0%, Ted Cruz 9.7%, Marco Rubio 8.9%, Carly Fiorina 4.6%, Ben Carson 3.8%, Rand Paul 3.0%, Rick Santorum 2.6%, Mike Huckabee 1.0%
Fox News Margin of error: ± 3.5% Sample size: 414	January 4–7, 2016	Donald Trump; 33%	Marco Rubio; 15%	Ted Cruz 12%	Jeb Bush 9%, John Kasich 7%, Rand Paul 5%, Chris Christie 5%, Ben Carson 4%, Carly Fiorina 3%, Mike Huckabee 0%, Rick Santorum 0%, Jim Gilmore 0%, Undecided 4%
Public Policy Polling Margin of error: ± 4.3% Sample size: 515	January 4–6, 2016	Donald Trump; 29%	Marco Rubio; 15%	Chris Christie/ John Kasich; 11%	Ted Cruz 10%, Jeb Bush 10%, Carly Fiorina 4%, Ben Carson 4%, Rand Paul 3%, Mike Huckabee 1%, Rick Santorum 1%, Undecided 2%

Polls in 2015

Poll source	Date	1st	2nd	3rd	Other
American Research Group Margin of error: ± 4% Sample size: 600	December 20–22, 2015	Donald Trump; 21%	Marco Rubio; 15%	John Kasich; 13%	Chris Christie 12%, Ted Cruz 10%, Jeb Bush 7%, Ben Carson 6%, Carly Fiorina 5%, Rand Paul 4%, Jim Gilmore 0%, Mike Huckabee 0%, George Pataki 0%, Rick Santorum 0%, Undecided 5%
Date AL Margin of error: ± 4.4% Sample size: 500	December 19–22, 2015	Donald Trump; 29%	Ted Cruz; 13%	Chris Christie/ Marco Rubio; 12%	John Kasich 7%, Jeb Bush 6%, Rand Paul 5%, Carly Fiorina 4%, Ben Carson 3%, Undecided 6%
Associated Industries of Florida Margin of error: ± 4.4% Sample size: 500	December 17–18, 2015	Donald Trump; 24%	Ted Cruz; 16%	Marco Rubio; 14%	Chris Christie 13%, Jeb Bush 9%, Others 13%, Undecided 11%
CBS News/YouGov Margin of error: ± 5.7% Sample size: 1091	December 14–17, 2015	Donald Trump; 32%	Ted Cruz; 14%	Marco Rubio; 13%	Chris Christie 11%, John Kasich 8%, Jeb Bush 6%, Ben Carson 5%, Rand Paul 5%, Carly Fiorina 4%, Lindsey Graham 0%, George Pataki 0%, Rick Santorum 0%, Mike Huckabee 0%, Jim Gilmore 0%, No preference 1%
Franklin Pierce/RKM/Boston Herald Margin of error: ± 4.7% Sample size: 403	December 13–17, 2015	Donald Trump; 26.0%	Ted Cruz; 12.4%	Marco Rubio; 12.4%	Chris Christie 10.8%, Jeb Bush 9.8%, John Kasich 7.5%, Carly Fiorina 6.1%, Ben Carson 4.8%, Rand Paul 2.9%, Lindsey Graham 0.4%, George Pataki 0.3%, Rick Santorum 0.3%, Mike Huckabee 0.2%, Other 1.4%, Undecided 4.6%
MassINC/WBUR Margin of error: ± 4.9% Sample size: 402	December 6–8, 2015	Donald Trump; 27%	Chris Christie; 12%	Marco Rubio; 11%	Ted Cruz 10%, Jeb Bush 8%, John Kasich 7%, Ben Carson 6%, Carly Fiorina 3%, Rand Paul 2%, Mike Huckabee 1%, Lindsey Graham 0%, George Pataki 0%, Rick Santorum 0%, Jim Gilmore 0%, Undecided 9%, Wouldn't vote 2%
Adrian Gray Consulting Margin of error: ± 4% Sample size: 525	December 6–8, 2015	Donald Trump; 19%	Marco Rubio; 18%	Ted Cruz; 11%	Ben Carson 9%, Jeb Bush 8%, Chris Christie 8%, John Kasich 6%, Rand Paul 5%, Carly Fiorina 2%, Mike Huckabee 2%, Lindsey Graham 1%, George Pataki 1%, Rick Santorum 1%, Undecided 9%
CNN/UNH/WMUR Margin of error: ± 4.9% Sample size: 402	November 30 – December 7, 2015	Donald Trump; 32%	Marco Rubio 14%	Chris Christie 9%	Jeb Bush 8%, John Kasich 7%, Ted Cruz 6%, Ben Carson 5%, Carly Fiorina 5%, Rand Paul 2%, Lindsey Graham 1%, Mike Huckabee 1%, Rick Santorum 0%, George Pataki 0%, Jim Gilmore 0%, Undecided 9%
Public Policy Polling Margin of error: ± 4.6% Sample size: 454	November 30 – December 2, 2015	Donald Trump; 27%	Ted Cruz; 13%	Marco Rubio; 11%	Chris Christie 10%, Ben Carson 9%, John Kasich 8%, Carly Fiorina 6%, Jeb Bush 5%, Rand Paul 4%, Rick Santorum 1%, Mike Huckabee 1%, George Pataki 1%, Lindsey Graham 0%, Jim Gilmore 0%, Undecided 2%
CBS News/YouGov Margin of error: ± 6.3% Sample size: ?	November 15–19, 2015	Donald Trump; 32%	Marco Rubio; 13%	Ted Cruz/Ben Carson; 10%	John Kasich 8%, Jeb Bush 6%, Carly Fiorina 6%, Chris Christie 6%, Rand Paul 6%, Rick Santorum 1%, Mike Huckabee 1%, Lindsey Graham 1%, George Pataki 0%, Bobby Jindal 0%, Jim Gilmore 0%
Boston Globe/Suffolk University Margin of error: ± 4.4% Sample size: 500	November 17–19, 2015	Mitt Romney; 31%	Donald Trump; 15%	Ben Carson/Ted Cruz; 7%	Marco Rubio 6%, John Kasich 6%, Jeb Bush 3%, Carly Fiorina 3%, Chris Cristie 2%, Rand Paul 2%, Undecided 17%
Boston Globe/Suffolk University Margin of error: ± 4.4% Sample size: 500	November 17–19, 2015	Donald Trump; 22%	Marco Rubio; 11%	Ben Carson; 10%	John Kasich 9%, Ted Cruz 9%, Jeb Bush 8%, Chris Cristie 4%, Carly Fiorina 4%, Rand Paul 3%, Mike Huckabee 1%, Rick Santorum 0%, Lindsey Graham 0%, George Pataki 0%, Undecided 18%
Fox News Margin of error: ± 3.5; Sample size: 804	November 15–17, 2015	Donald Trump; 27%	Marco Rubio 13%	Ted Cruz 11%	Ben Carson 9%, Jeb Bush 9%, John Kasich 7%, Chris Christie 6%, Rand Paul 5%, Carly Fiorina 3%, Mike Huckabee 1%, Lindsey Graham 1%, Rick Santorum 1%
WBUR Margin of error: ± 4.9% Sample size: 405	November 14–15, 2015	Donald Trump; 22%	Ben Carson; 11%	Marco Rubio; 11%	Ted Cruz 8%, Jeb Bush 7%, John Kasich 7%, Chris Christie 5%, Rand Paul 5%, Carly Fiorina 3%, Lindsey Graham 2%, Mike Huckabee 1%, Bobby Jindal 1%, George Pataki 1%, Rick Santorum 1%, Jim Gilmore 0%, Other 1%, Wouldn't vote 1%, DK 13%
Gravis Margin of error: ± 5.4% Sample size: 330	November 11, 2015	Donald Trump; 29%	Ted Cruz; 12%	Marco Rubio; 10%	Chris Christie 8%, Jeb Bush 8%, Ben Carson 7%, John Kasich 5%, Rand Paul 5%, Carly Fiorina 4%, Mike Huckabee 1%, Bobby Jindal 1%, George Pataki <1%, Lindsey Graham <1%, Rick Santorum <1%, Jim Gilmore 0%, Unsure 9%
WBUR Margin of error: ± 4.9% Sample size: 400	October 29 – November 1, 2015	Donald Trump; 18%	Ben Carson; 15%	Marco Rubio; 9%	John Kasich 8%, Jeb Bush 7%, Chris Christie 7%, Ted Cruz 6%, Carly Fiorina 5%, Rand Paul 3%, George Pataki 1%, Bobby Jindal 1%, Mike Huckabee <1%, Rick Santorum 0%, Lindsey Graham 0%, Jim Gilmore 0%, Other <1%, Wouldn't vote 1%, DK/Refused 18%
Monmouth University Margin of error: ± 4.8% Sample size: 410	October 29 – November 1, 2015	Donald Trump; 26%	Ben Carson; 16%	Marco Rubio; 13%	John Kasich 11%, Ted Cruz 9%, Jeb Bush 7%, Carly Fiorina 5%, Chris Christie 5%, Rand Paul 3%, Mike Huckabee 1%, Rick Santorum 0%, George Pataki 0%, Lindsey Graham 0%, Bobby Jindal 0%, Jim Gilmore 0%, Undecided 3%
Public Policy Polling Margin of error: ± 4.8% Sample size: 417	October 16–18, 2015	Donald Trump; 28%	Marco Rubio; 12%	Ben Carson; 11%	John Kasich 10%, Jeb Bush 9%, Ted Cruz 8%, Carly Fiorina 7%, Rand Paul 4%, Chris Christie 3%, Rick Santorum 2%, Mike Huckabee 1%, George Pataki 1%, Lindsey Graham 1%, Bobby Jindal 1%, Jim Gilmore 0%, Undecided 3%
NBC/WSJ Margin of error: ± 4.8% Sample size: 413	October 2015	Donald Trump; 21%	Carly Fiorina; 16%	Jeb Bush; 11%	Ben Carson 10%, Marco Rubio 10%, Chris Christie 7%, John Kasich 6%, Ted Cruz 6%, Rand Paul 5%, Mike Huckabee 1%, George Pataki <1%, Lindsey Graham <1%, Jim Gilmore <1%, Bobby Jindal <1%, Rick Santorum <1%, Undecided 6%
CNN/WMUR Margin of error: ± 5.3% Sample size: 344	September 17–23, 2015	Donald Trump; 26%	Carly Fiorina; 16%	Marco Rubio; 9%	Ben Carson 8%, John Kasich 7%, Jeb Bush 7%, Ted Cruz 5%, Chris Christie 5%, Rand Paul 3%, Lindsey Graham 1%, Mike Huckabee 0%, Jim Gilmore 0%, Bobby Jindal 0%, Rick Santorum 0%, Scott Walker 0%, Someone else 0%, Don't know/ Not sure 11%
Voter Gravity Margin of error: ± ?% Sample size: 2839	September 17, 2015	Carly Fiorina; 22%	Donald Trump; 18%	Ben Carson; 10%	John Kasich 9%, Jeb Bush 9%, Marco Rubio 7%, Ted Cruz 6%, Chris Christie 6%, Rand Paul 3%, Scott Walker 2%, Mike Huckabee 2%, Other 6%
WBUR Margin of error: ± 4.9% Sample size: 404	September 12–14, 2015	Donald Trump; 22%	Ben Carson; 18%	Carly Fiorina; 11%	Jeb Bush 9%, John Kasich 9%, Ted Cruz 5%, Rand Paul 4%, Marco Rubio 2%, Chris Christie 2%, Scott Walker 1%, Mike Huckabee 1%, Lindsey Graham 0.9%, Bobby Jindal 0.4%, Rick Santorum 0.3%, George Pataki 0.2%, Jim Gilmore 0%, DK/Other/Undecided 14%
Monmouth University Margin of error: ± 4.8% Sample size: 415	September 10–13, 2015	Donald Trump; 28%	Ben Carson; 17%	John Kasich; 11%	Ted Cruz 8%, Carly Fiorina 7%, Jeb Bush 7%, Rand Paul 4%, Marco Rubio 4%, Scott Walker 2%, Chris Christie 2%, Mike Huckabee 1%, George Pataki 1%, Rick Santorum 1%, Lindsey Graham 1%, Bobby Jindal <1%, Jim Gilmore 0%, Other 1%, Undecided 7%
CBS News/YouGov Margin of error: ± 6.3% Sample size: 610	September 3–10, 2015	Donald Trump; 40%	Ben Carson; 12%	John Kasich; 11%	Carly Fiorina 6%, Jeb Bush 6%, Rand Paul 6%, Ted Cruz 5%, Scott Walker 3%, Marco Rubio 2%, Chris Christie 2%, Mike Huckabee 1%, Rick Perry 1%, George Pataki 0%, Rick Santorum 0%, Jim Gilmore 0%, Lindsey Graham 0%, Bobby Jindal 0% Undecided 6%
NBC News/Marist Margin of error: ± 4.8% Sample size: 413	August 26- September 2, 2015	Donald Trump; 28%	John Kasich; 12%	Ben Carson; 11%	Jeb Bush 8%, Carly Fiorina 6%, Rand Paul 5%, Chris Christie 5%, Ted Cruz 5%, Scott Walker 4%, Marco Rubio 3%, Mike Huckabee 2%, Lindsey Graham 1%, Bobby Jindal 1%, Rick Perry 0%, George Pataki 0%, Rick Santorum 0%, Jim Gilmore 0%, Unsure 8%
Public Policy Polling Margin of error: ± 4.7% Sample size: 436	August 21–24, 2015	Donald Trump; 35%	John Kasich; 11%	Carly Fiorina; 10%	Jeb Bush 7%, Scott Walker 7%, Ben Carson 6%, Chris Christie 4%, Marco Rubio 4%, Ted Cruz 4%, Rand Paul 3%, Rick Perry 2%, Lindsey Graham 1%, George Pataki 1%, Rick Santorum 1%, Jim Gilmore 0%, Bobby Jindal 0%, Mike Huckabee 0%, Unsure 4%
Boston Herald/FPU Margin of error: ± 4.8% Sample size: 414	August 7–10, 2015	Donald Trump; 18%	Jeb Bush; 13%	John Kasich; 12%	Ted Cruz 10%, Carly Fiorina 9%, Rand Paul 6%, Ben Carson 4%, Marco Rubio 4%, Scott Walker 4%, Mike Huckabee 3%, Chris Christie 3%, Lindsey Graham 1%, George Pataki 0%, Bobby Jindal 1%, Rick Perry 1%, Rick Santorum 1%, Other 3%, Unsure 9%
Gravis Marketing Margin of error: ± 4% Sample size: 599	July 31– August 3, 2015	Donald Trump; 32%	John Kasich; 15%	Chris Christie; 9%	Ben Carson 8%, Scott Walker 8%, Jeb Bush 7%, Rand Paul 6%, Ted Cruz 3%, Marco Rubio 3%, Carly Fiorina 2%, Lindsey Graham 2%, Rick Santorum 2%, Bobby Jindal 1%, Mike Huckabee 1%, Rick Perry 0%
Monmouth University Margin of error: ± 4.5% Sample size: 467	July 23–26, 2015	Donald Trump; 24%	Jeb Bush; 12%	Scott Walker; 7%	John Kasich 7%, Marco Rubio 6%, Rand Paul 5%, Ben Carson 5%, Chris Christie 4%, Ted Cruz 3%, Carly Fiorina 3%, Mike Huckabee 2%, George Pataki 2%, Bobby Jindal 2%, Rick Perry 1%, Rick Santorum 1%, Undecided 14%
Marist Margin of error: ± 5.0% Sample size: 401	July 14–21, 2015	Donald Trump; 21%	Jeb Bush; 14%	Scott Walker; 12%	John Kasich 7%, Chris Christie 6%, Ben Carson 6%, Marco Rubio 5%, Ted Cruz 5%, Rand Paul 4%, Mike Huckabee3%, Carly Fiorina 2%, George Pataki 2%, Rick Perry 2%, Bobby Jindal <1%, Rick Santorum <1%, Lindsey Graham <1%, Jim Gilmore <1%, Undecided 13%
CNN/WMUR Margin of error: ± 4.9% Sample size: 402	June 18–24, 2015	Jeb Bush; 16%	Donald Trump; 11%	Rand Paul; 9%	Scott Walker 8%, Carly Fiorina 6%, Marco Rubio 6%, Ben Carson 5%, Chris Christie 5%, Rick Perry 4%, Ted Cruz 3%, Mike Huckabee 2%, John Kasich 2%, Lindsey Graham 1%, George Pataki 1%, Bob Erhlich 0%, Jim Gilmore 0%, Bobby Jindal 0%, Peter King 0%, Rick Santorum 0%, Someone else 1%, DK/Not sure 21%
Sulfolk University Margin of error: ± 4.4% Sample size: 500	June 18–22, 2015	Jeb Bush; 14%	Donald Trump; 11%	Scott Walker; 8%	Marco Rubio 7%, Ben Carson 6%, Chris Christie 5%, Rand Paul 4%, Ted Cruz 4%, Carly Fiorina 4%, Mike Huckabee 2%, John Kasich 2%, George Pataki 1%, Rick Perry 1%, Rick Santorum 1%, Lindsey Graham 0%, Bobby Jindal 0%, Bob Ehrlich 0%, Mark Everson 0%, Jim Gilmore 0%, Other 1%, Undecided 29%
Morning Consult Margin of error: ± 5.2% Sample size: 349	May 31 – June 8, 2015	Jeb Bush; 14%	Scott Walker; 10%	Rand Paul; 9%	Marco Rubio 8%, Donald Trump 8%, Chris Christie 7%, Ben Carson 6%, Mike Huckabee 6%, Carly Fiorina 5%, Ted Cruz 4%, Someone else 4%, Don't know 19%
Gravis Marketing Margin of error: ± 4.0% Sample size: 487	June 3–4, 2015	Jeb Bush; 21%	Rand Paul; 13%	Scott Walker; 13%	Donald Trump 12%, Marco Rubio 9%, Ben Carson 5%, Carly Fiorina 5%, Mike Huckabee 5%, Chris Christie 4%, Ted Cruz 4%, Unsure 9%
Purple Strategies Margin of error: ± 4.9% Sample size: 400	May 2–6, 2015	Rand Paul; 12%	Scott Walker; 12%	Jeb Bush; 11%	Marco Rubio 11%, Donald Trump 8%, Chris Christie 7%, Ted Cruz 6%, Ben Carson 5%, Mike Huckabee 4%, Carly Fiorina 3%, Lindsey Graham 1%, Bobby Jindal 1%, John Kasich 1%, Rick Perry 1%, Rick Santorum 1%, Other 1%, None of the above 3%, Not sure 12%
WMUR/UNH Margin of error: ± 5.7% Sample size: 293	April 24 – May 3, 2015	Jeb Bush; 15%	Marco Rubio; 12%	Scott Walker; 11%	Rand Paul 10%, Ted Cruz 6%, Donald Trump 5%, Ben Carson 4%, Carly Fiorina 4%, Rick Perry 4%, Chris Christie 3%, Mike Huckabee 3%, Bobby Jindal 2%, George Pataki 2%, Rick Santorum 2%, Lindsey Graham 1%, John Kasich 1%, Bob Ehrlich <1%, Peter T. King <1%, John R. Bolton 0%, Jim Gilmore 0%, Other 1%, Undecided 14%
Gravis Marketing Margin of error: ± 4% Sample size: 666	April 21–22, 2015	Jeb Bush; 18%	Scott Walker; 16%	Rand Paul; 15%	Marco Rubio 11%, Ted Cruz 10%, Chris Christie 5%, Ben Carson 4%, Carly Fiorina 3%, Mike Huckabee 3%, Rick Santorum 1%, Undecided 15%
Public Policy Polling Margin of error: ± 5.2% Sample size: 358	April 9–13, 2015	Scott Walker; 24%	Ted Cruz; 14%	Rand Paul; 12%	Jeb Bush 10%, Chris Christie 8%, Marco Rubio 8%, Ben Carson 7%, Mike Huckabee 7%, Rick Perry 4%, Undecided 7%
Reach Communications Margin of error: ± 3% Sample size: 1,064	April 8–9, 2015	Scott Walker; 22.7%	Jeb Bush; 16.5%	Rand Paul; 14.9%	Ted Cruz 8.9%, Donald Trump 8%, Ben Carson 7%, Marco Rubio 7%, Chris Christie 5.8%, Mike Huckabee 5.5%, Carly Fiorina 1.9%, Rick Perry 1.6%
FPU/Boston Herald Margin of error: ± 4.7% Sample size: 429	March 22–25, 2015	Jeb Bush; 15%	Scott Walker; 15%	Rand Paul; 13%	Chris Christie 10%, Ted Cruz 9%, Mike Huckabee 7%, Ben Carson 4%, Marco Rubio 4%, Rick Perry 2%, Rick Santorum 2%, John R. Bolton 1%, Bobby Jindal 1%, John Kasich 1%, Carly Fiorina <1%, Lindsey Graham <1%, George Pataki <1%, Other 5%, Undecided 10%
Gravis Marketing Margin of error: ± 4% Sample size: 683	March 18–19, 2015	Scott Walker; 19%	Jeb Bush; 18%	Chris Christie; 10%	Rand Paul 10%, Marco Rubio 7%, Ben Carson 6%, Ted Cruz 6%, Carly Fiorina 4%, Mike Huckabee 4%, Rick Santorum 1%, Undecided 16%
NBC News/Marist Margin of error: ± 5% Sample size: 381	February 3–10, 2015	Jeb Bush; 18%	Scott Walker; 15%	Rand Paul; 14%	Chris Christie 13%, Ben Carson 7%, Mike Huckabee 7%, Ted Cruz 6%, Marco Rubio 6%, Lindsey Graham 1%, Rick Perry 1%, Rick Santorum 1%, Undecided 13%
Purple Strategies Margin of error: ± 4.9% Sample size: 400	January 31 – February 5, 2015	Jeb Bush; 16%	Rand Paul; 13%	Scott Walker; 12%	Chris Christie 10%, Ben Carson 6%, Mike Huckabee 6%, Marco Rubio 5%, Ted Cruz 3%, Bobby Jindal 3%, Donald Trump 3%, John Kasich 2%, Rick Santorum 2%, Carly Fiorina 1% Rick Perry 1%, Mike Pence 0%, Someone else 1%, None of the above 2%, Not sure 14%
Gravis Marketing Margin of error: ± 4% Sample size: 608	February 2–3, 2015	Scott Walker; 23%	Jeb Bush; 16%	Chris Christie; 12%	Rand Paul 11%, Marco Rubio 8%, Ted Cruz 6%, Mike Huckabee 6%, Rick Santorum 3%, Rick Perry 2%, Mike Pence 0%, Unsure 14%
Reach Communications Margin of error: ± 3.08% Sample size: 1,012	February 2–3, 2015	Scott Walker; 21.2%	Jeb Bush; 14.4%	Rand Paul; 8.3%	Ben Carson 8.2%, Chris Christie 7%, Mike Huckabee 6.8%, Marco Rubio 5.4%, Ted Cruz 3.3%, Rick Perry 2.7%, George Pataki 2.2%, Carly Fiorina 1.7%, Someone else 18.8%
UNH/WMUR Margin of error: ± 5.3% Sample size: 348	January 22 – February 3, 2015	Jeb Bush; 17%	Scott Walker; 12%	Chris Christie; 9%	Mike Huckabee 9%, Rand Paul 9%, Ben Carson 8%, Marco Rubio 5%, Ted Cruz 4%, Rick Perry 2%, Rick Santorum 2%, Donald Trump 2%, John Bolton 1%, Bobby Jindal 1%, John Kasich 1%, George Pataki 1%, Carly Fiorina 0%, Peter King 0%, Someone else 1%, Don't know yet 15%
Reach Communications Margin of error: ± 3.4% Sample size: 827	January 21, 2015	Mitt Romney; 29%	Jeb Bush; 11%	Chris Christie; 8%	Scott Walker 8%, Ben Carson 7%, Rand Paul 7%, Mike Huckabee 5%, Ted Cruz 4%, Marco Rubio 3%, Someone else 18%

Polls in 2014

Poll source	Date	1st	2nd	3rd	Other
Purple Insights Margin of error: ± 4.9% Sample size: 407	November 12–18, 2014	Mitt Romney; 30%	Rand Paul; 11%	Chris Christie; 9%	Jeb Bush 8%, Ben Carson 6%, Ted Cruz 5%, Mike Huckabee 5%, Paul Ryan 5%, Bobby Jindal 3%, Rick Perry 2%, Someone else 1%, None of the above 3%, Not sure 11%
Purple Insights Margin of error: ± 4.9% Sample size: 407	November 12–18, 2014	Chris Christie; 16%	Rand Paul; 16%	Jeb Bush; 14%	Ben Carson 9%, Mike Huckabee 8%, Paul Ryan 7%, Ted Cruz 5%, Bobby Jindal 4%, Rick Perry 3%, Someone else 1%, None of the above 4%, Not sure 13%
Public Policy Polling Margin of error: ± 3.66% Sample size: 673	November 1–3, 2014	Jeb Bush; 15%	Ben Carson; 15%	Chris Christie; 11%	Mike Huckabee 11%, Ted Cruz 10%, Rand Paul 10%, Marco Rubio 7%, Paul Ryan 7%, Rick Perry 3%, Someone else/Not sure 11%
New England College Margin of error: ± 3.66% Sample size: 717	October 31 – November 1, 2014	Jeb Bush; 17.3%	Chris Christie; 14.7%	Ted Cruz; 10.4%	Mike Huckabee 9.9%, Rand Paul 7.9%, Marco Rubio 7.4%, Rick Perry 4.7%, Rick Santorum 3.1%, Bobby Jindal 2.6%, Other 22%
UMass Amherst Margin of error: ± ? Sample size: 191	October 10–15, 2014	Mitt Romney; 29%	Jeb Bush; 11%	Rand Paul; 11%	Ted Cruz 10%, Mike Huckabee 7%, Chris Christie 6%, Marco Rubio 5%, Rick Perry 3%, Paul Ryan 3%, Jon Huntsman Jr. 2%, Bobby Jindal 2%, Rick Santorum 2%, Rob Portman <1%, Other 9%
WMUR/UNH Margin of error: ± 5.9% Sample size: 275	September 29 – October 5, 2014	Jeb Bush; 15%	Chris Christie; 12%	Mike Huckabee; 9%	Rand Paul 7%, Ted Cruz 6%, Paul Ryan 6%, Bobby Jindal 3%, Marco Rubio 3%, Scott Walker 3%, Rick Perry 2%, Rick Santorum 2%, John Kasich <1%, Rob Portman <1%, Other 1%, Undecided 28%
CNN/ORC Margin of error: ± 5% Sample size: 383	September 8–11, 2014	Rand Paul; 15%	Jeb Bush; 10%	Paul Ryan; 10%	Chris Christie 9%, Mike Huckabee 9%, Rick Perry 7%, Marco Rubio 7%, Scott Walker 7%, Ted Cruz 6%, Bobby Jindal 3%, Rick Santorum 3%, Mike Pence 0%, Other 3%, None/No one 4%, No opinion 7%
NBC News/Marist Margin of error: ± 4.2% Sample size: 544	July 7–13, 2014	Rand Paul; 14%	Chris Christie; 13%	Jeb Bush; 10%	Ted Cruz 9%, Marco Rubio 7%, Paul Ryan 7%, Scott Walker 6%, Rick Perry 5%, Bobby Jindal 4%, Rick Santorum 3%, Undecided 22%
WMUR/UNH Margin of error: ± 6.2% Sample size: 251	June 19 – July 1, 2014	Chris Christie; 19%	Rand Paul; 14%	Jeb Bush; 11%	Mike Huckabee 8%, Marco Rubio 8%, Ted Cruz 5%, Bobby Jindal 5%, Paul Ryan 5%, Scott Walker 3%, Rick Perry 2%, Rick Santorum 1%, Rob Portman 1%, John Kasich <1%, Other 3%, Undecided 15%
Suffolk University/Boston Herald Margin of error: ± 4.8% Sample size: 419	June 14–18, 2014	Chris Christie; 11.22%	Rand Paul; 10.98%	Jeb Bush; 8.35%	Ted Cruz 7.88%, Jon Huntsman 7.16%, Marco Rubio 4.53%, Mike Huckabee 4.3%, Scott Walker 3.82%, Bobby Jindal 3.34%, Paul Ryan 2.86%, Rick Perry 1.67%, Rick Santorum 0.95%, Undecided 32.93%
Suffolk University/Boston Herald Margin of error: ± 4.8% Sample size: 419	June 14–18, 2014	Mitt Romney; 24.2%	Chris Christie; 9.25%	Rand Paul; 7.83%	Jeb Bush 6.76%, Jon Huntsman 5.34%, Marco Rubio 4.27%, Ted Cruz 3.56%, Bobby Jindal 3.2%, Scott Walker 3.2%, Mike Huckabee 2.49%, Rick Santorum 2.49%, Rick Perry 1.07%, Paul Ryan 1.07%, Undecided 25.27%
WMUR/UNH Margin of error: ± 7.2% Sample size: 187	April 1–9, 2014	Rand Paul; 15%	Kelly Ayotte; 13%	Paul Ryan; 13%	Chris Christie 12%, Jeb Bush 7%, Ted Cruz 7%, Donald Trump 5%, Bobby Jindal 3%, Scott Walker 3%, Marco Rubio 2%, Rick Perry 1%, Rick Santorum 1%, Rob Portman <1%, Other 3%, Undecided 15%
Suffolk University/Boston Herald Margin of error: ± ? Sample size: 426	February 27 – March 5, 2014	Rand Paul; 12.21%	Chris Christie; 11.5%	Jeb Bush; 9.39%	Paul Ryan 9.15%, Jon Huntsman Jr. 8.22%, Scott Walker 6.57%, Marco Rubio 5.63%, Mike Huckabee 5.4%, Ted Cruz 4.93%, Scott Brown 4.69%, Bobby Jindal 4.23%, Rick Santorum 2.35%, Undecided 15.73%
Gravis Marketing Margin of error: ± 4.3% Sample size: 498	January 29–30, 2014	Jeb Bush; 16%	Chris Christie; 15%	Ted Cruz; 12%	Rand Paul 12%, Mike Huckabee 11%, Marco Rubio 8%, Scott Walker 7%, Rick Santorum 3%, Undecided 16%
WMUR/UNH Margin of error: ± 6.2% Sample size: 246	January 21–26, 2014	Rand Paul; 16%	Kelly Ayotte; 13%	Scott Brown; 11%	Chris Christie 9%, Marco Rubio 6%, Paul Ryan 6%, Donald Trump 4%, Jeb Bush 3%, Ted Cruz 3%, Rick Perry 2%, Scott Walker 2%, Peter King <1%, Rob Portman <1%, Other 6%, Undecided 18%
Purple Strategies Margin of error: ± 4.2% Sample size: 535	January 21–23, 2014	Mitt Romney; 25%	Rand Paul; 18%	Chris Christie; 17%	Jeb Bush 13%, Ted Cruz 7%, Bobby Jindal 5%, Other 4%, None of the above 2%, Undecided 9%
Public Policy Polling Margin of error: ± 4.3% Sample size: 528	January 9–12, 2014	Chris Christie; 24%	Jeb Bush; 12%	Rand Paul; 12%	Mike Huckabee 11%, Ted Cruz 9%, Marco Rubio 8%, Paul Ryan 4%, Bobby Jindal 3%, Scott Walker 3%, Someone else/Not sure 13%
Public Policy Polling Margin of error: ± 4.3% Sample size: 528	January 9–12, 2014	Chris Christie; 28%	Jeb Bush; 14%	Rand Paul; 14%	Ted Cruz 10%, Paul Ryan 9%, Marco Rubio 8%, Bobby Jindal 3%, Scott Walker 3%, Someone else/Not sure 10%

Polls in 2013

Poll source	Date	1st	2nd	3rd	Other
WMUR/UNH Margin of error: ± 6.4% Sample size: 236	October 7–16, 2013	Rand Paul; 17%	Chris Christie; 16%	Paul Ryan; 9%	Jeb Bush 8%, Scott Brown 7%, Ted Cruz 6%, Marco Rubio 4%, Rick Santorum 4%, Scott Walker 2%, Rick Perry 1%, John Kasich <1%, Peter King <1%, Rob Portman <1%, Other 3%, Unsure 21%
Public Policy Polling Margin of error: ± 4.4% Sample size: 491	September 13–16, 2013	Rand Paul; 20%	Chris Christie; 19%	Jeb Bush; 14%	Kelly Ayotte 12%, Ted Cruz 10%, Marco Rubio 7%, Paul Ryan 7%, Bobby Jindal 3%, Rick Santorum 2%, Someone else/Not sure 6%
WMUR/UNH Margin of error: ± 6.9% Sample size: 200	July 18–29, 2013	Chris Christie; 21%	Rand Paul; 16%	Jeb Bush; 10%	Paul Ryan 8%, Marco Rubio 6%, Ted Cruz 4%, Rick Perry 4%, Rick Santorum 4%, Scott Walker 2%, Bobby Jindal <1%, John Kasich <1%, Rob Portman <1%, Other 3%, Unsure 20%
New England College Margin of error: ± 5.42% Sample size: 326	July, 2013	Rand Paul; 19%	Chris Christie; 17.5%	Marco Rubio; 13%	Paul Ryan 9.5%, Kelly Ayotte 8.6%, Rick Santorum 5.5%, Bobby Jindal 2.5%, Rick Perry 2.1%, Scott Walker 1.8%, Unsure 20%
New England College Margin of error: ± 5.3% Sample size: 340	May 2–5, 2013	Marco Rubio; 17%	Jeb Bush; 16%	Rand Paul; 15%	Chris Christie 12%, Paul Ryan 12%, Jon Huntsman 6%, Rick Santorum 4%, Bobby Jindal 2%, Unsure 16%
Public Policy Polling Margin of error: ± 4.9% Sample size: 409	April 19–21, 2013	Rand Paul; 28%	Marco Rubio; 25%	Chris Christie; 14%	Jeb Bush 7%, Paul Ryan 7%, Rick Santorum 4%, Susana Martinez 3%, Bobby Jindal 1%, Rick Perry 1%, Someone Else/Undecided 11%
WMUR/UNH Margin of error: ± 7.5% Sample size: 171	April 4–9, 2013	Rand Paul; 15%	Marco Rubio; 15%	Chris Christie; 11%	Paul Ryan 11%, Kelly Ayotte 5%, Jeb Bush 5%, Jon Huntsman Jr. 5%, Rick Santorum 4%, Bobby Jindal 2%, Ted Cruz 2%, Rob Portman 1%, Scott Walker 1%, John Thune 0%, Someone Else 0%, Undecided 23%
WMUR/UNH Margin of error: ± 7% Sample size: 212	January 30 – February 5, 2013	Chris Christie; 14%	Marco Rubio; 12%	Paul Ryan; 11%	Kelly Ayotte 10%, Rand Paul 8%, Jon Huntsman Jr. 8%, Jeb Bush 5%, Rick Santorum 3%, Scott Walker 3%, Bobby Jindal 2%, Ted Cruz 1%, John Thune 1%, Rob Portman 0%, Someone Else 2%, Undecided 20%

== See also ==
General election polling

- Nationwide opinion polling for the United States presidential election, 2016
- Nationwide opinion polling for the United States presidential election by demographics, 2016
- Statewide opinion polling for the United States presidential election, 2016

Democratic primary polling

- Nationwide opinion polling for the Democratic Party 2016 presidential primaries
- Statewide opinion polling for the Democratic Party presidential primaries, 2016

Republican primary polling

- Nationwide opinion polling for the Republican Party 2016 presidential primaries
