= So Low =

So Low may refer to:

- "So Low" (Ocean Colour Scene song)
- "So Low" (Self song)
- So Low, an album by Outlaws
- "So Low", a song by Nebula from the 1999 album To the Center

== See also ==
- Solow (disambiguation)
