= Alex Castellanos =

Cuban American political consultant

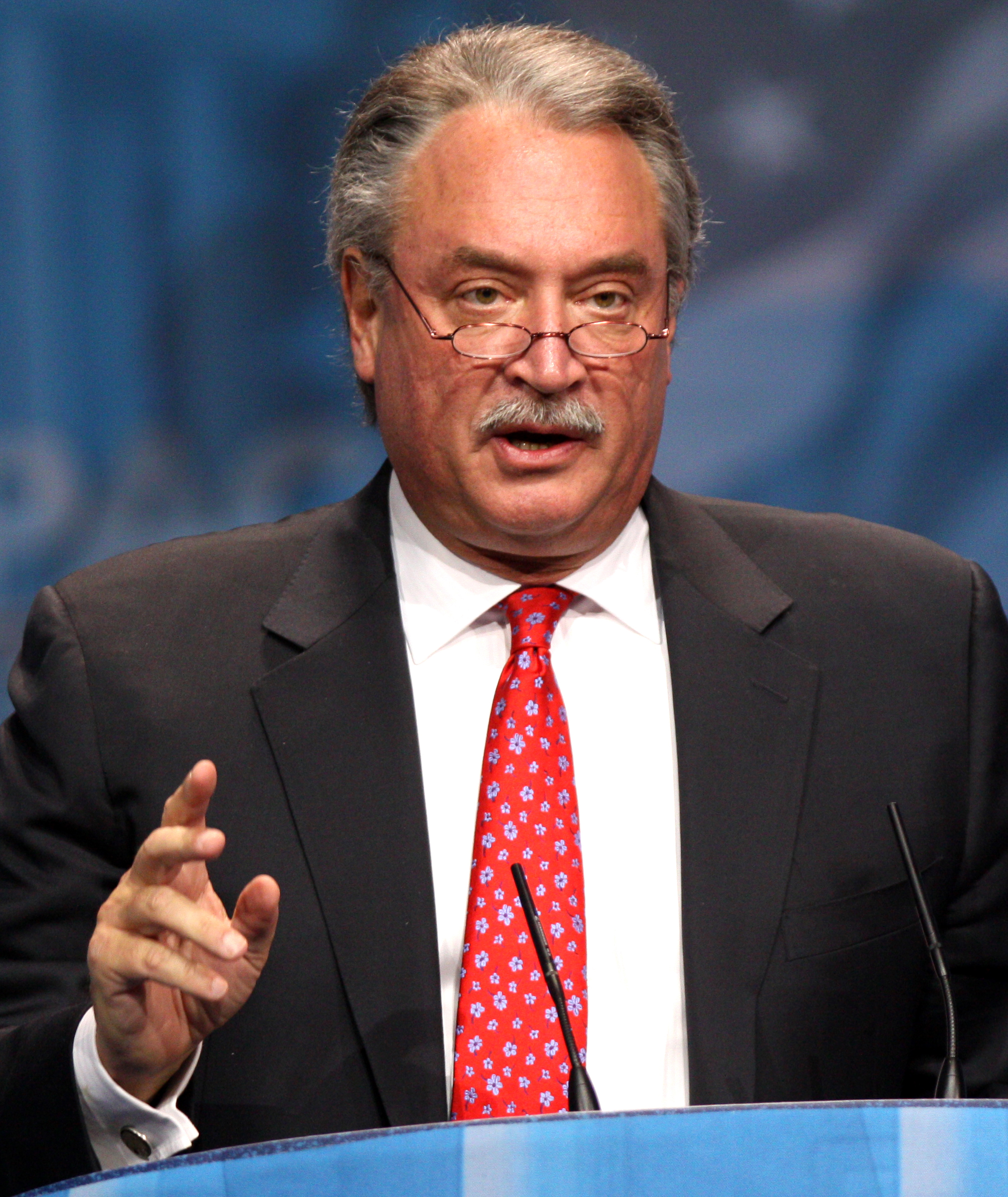
- Castellanos in 2013
- Born: Alejandro Castellanos; 1954 (age 71–72); Havana, Cuba
- Education: University of North Carolina, Chapel Hill
- Political party: Republican

Alejandro Castellanos (born 1954) is a Cuban-American political consultant. He has worked on electoral campaigns for Republican candidates including Bob Dole, George W. Bush, Jeb Bush, and Mitt Romney. In 2008, Castellanos, a partner at National Media Inc., co-founded Purple Strategies, a bipartisan communications firm. Castellanos is also a regular guest commentator on Meet the Press and a contributor for CNN.

== Early life and education ==
Alex Castellanos was born in Havana, Cuba in 1954 and immigrated to the United States in 1960 or 1961 with his family. He lived in North Carolina and attended the University of North Carolina, where he was a National Merit Scholar and a philosophy major. Castellanos is married and has two children.

== Career ==
Castellanos has worked as a political consultant for Republican candidates for state and federal elections since the 1980s, including six presidential elections. In particular, he has received media attention for his work developing ads for political campaigns and is sometimes referred to as "the father of the attack ad".

=== 1980s and 1990s: Early political work ===
Castellanos began his career working on the successful 1984 re-election campaigns for United States Senators Jesse Helms and Strom Thurmond. While working on these campaigns Castellanos met Mike Murphy, with whom he later formed the firm Murphy & Castellanos. Their firm worked on Bob Dole's 1988 presidential campaign. In 1989, Castellanos became a partner at National Media, Inc.

In 1990, Castellanos again worked on the re-election campaign for Jesse Helms. During the campaign, Castellanos drew media attention for an ad he created that showed the hands of a white man holding a rejection letter because he had lost a job to a minority worker. The ad, known as "Hands", was criticized by supporters of Helms' opponent, Harvey Gantt, for appealing to racial biases of white voters. Castellanos later explained that the intended message behind the ad was that "you shouldn't get a job or be denied a job because of the color of your skin." Also in 1990, Castellanos created television commercials for Bob Martinez's re-election campaign for governor of Florida.

Throughout the 1990s, Castellanos worked on a variety of Republican campaigns as a media consultant and strategist. These included George H. W. Bush's 1992 presidential election campaign, Jeb Bush's 1994 campaign for governor of Florida, and Guy Millner's 1994 campaign for governor of Georgia.

Castellanos again worked for Bob Dole on his 1996 presidential election campaign. It was during this campaign that Castellanos discussed the importance of "soccer moms" as a political demographic with The Washington Post columnist E.J. Dionne. The phrase went on to become one of the key buzzwords of the election year. Castellanos worked on Jesse Helms' re-election campaign in 1996; Helms pulled controversial ads against Charlie Sanders and Harvey Gantt in April 1996, and Castellanos left the campaign at that time. He worked for Bob Taft's 1998 campaign for governor of Ohio.

=== 2000s: Bush-Cheney and Romney campaigns ===
Castellanos served as a media advisor to George W. Bush in both his 2000 and 2004 presidential election campaigns. During the campaigns, "he sealed his reputation as one of the keenest, most cutthroat strategists in the business." While working on the 2000 campaign, Castellanos created an ad, titled "Priority", about the Medicare prescription plan Al Gore proposed in which the word "RATS" flashed briefly on the screen as the word "bureaucrats" appeared. This was discussed in the media as potential "subliminal messaging".

In 2007 Castellanos was named to GQ Magazine's list of the "50 Most Influential People in D.C." The following year, Castellanos worked for Mitt Romney's 2008 presidential campaign as part of the firm Midnight Ride Media, which managed advertising, production and media buying for the campaign.

=== 2008 to present: Purple Strategies ===
In 2008, the communications firm Purple Strategies was founded by Castellanos and Democrat Steve McMahon. According to Purple Strategies' managing partner Bruce Haynes, Castellanos and McMahon would routinely see each other while pitching to clients. The two ultimately decided to merge their "blue" and "red" consultancies to create a "purple" company.

Castellanos is currently a principal partner at Purple Strategies, major clients of the bipartisan firm have included the United States Chamber of Commerce, BP and PhRMA.

== Other activities ==
Castellanos is a guest commentator and contributor for CNN and has appeared on Meet the Press where he argued with Rachel Maddow in April 2012 about the existence of a gender gap in pay. Additionally, Castellanos writes online commentary for The Huffington Post and National Review, and is also a public speaker and member of the Washington Speakers Bureau.

In 2008, Castellanos was a resident fellow at Harvard University's Institute of Politics. The following year, Castellanos became a senior communications advisor to Republican National Committee chairman Michael Steele.

In 2013, Castellanos shaved his mustache on The Situation Room with Wolf Blitzer after promising to do so if 500 new donors would give to Citizens United for Research in Epilepsy. Also in 2013, Castellanos led a Super PAC project called NewRepublican.org, which is focused on broadening the Republican Party's demographic base. Along with other Republican political consultants, Castellanos signed a "friend of the court" brief in support of gay marriage in February 2013.
