= Solow =

Solow is a surname. Notable people with the surname include:

- Alan Solow, American lawyer and Jewish leader
- Herbert Solow (journalist) (1903–1964), American journalist
- Herbert Franklin Solow (1931–2020), American producer, director, studio executive, talent agent, and writer
- Jeffrey Solow (born 1949), American cello virtuoso
- Jennifer Solow, American novelist
- Robert Solow (1924–2023), American economist, Nobel Prize winner
- Sheldon Solow (1928–2020), American real estate billionaire

== In fiction ==
- Doctor Solow, a character in the 1984 Doctor Who story, Warriors of the Deep, played by Ingrid Pitt.

== See also ==
- Solow (horse), a Thoroughbred racehorse
- The Solow Building, a Manhattan skyscraper
- SoLow, Dutch retailer
