= 2025 Arnhem city fire =

March 2025 urban fire in Arnhem, Netherlands

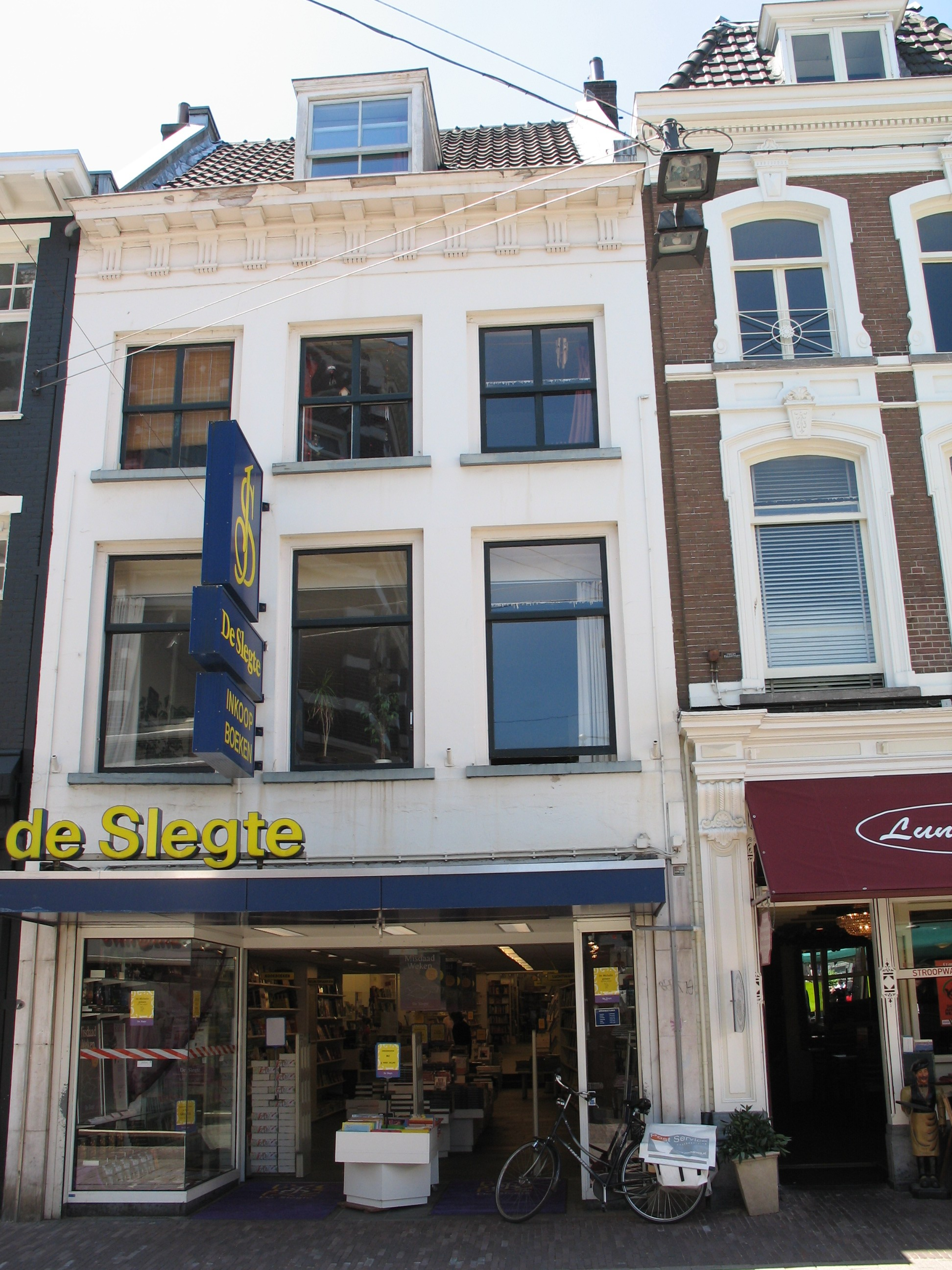
- Jansstraat 28, the building where the fire started, in 2010.
- Date: March 6, 2025
- Time: 3:45 a.m. (CET)
- Duration: 10 hours, 5 minutes
- Location: City center of Arnhem, Netherlands, between Jansstraat, Rozemarijnsteeg, Varkensstraat and Munterstraat.; 51°58′55″N 5°54′22″E
- Cause: Arson
- Motive: Under investigation
- Perpetrator: Under investigation
- Deaths: 0
- Property damage: 25 buildings damaged or destroyed
- Arrests: Three arson suspects

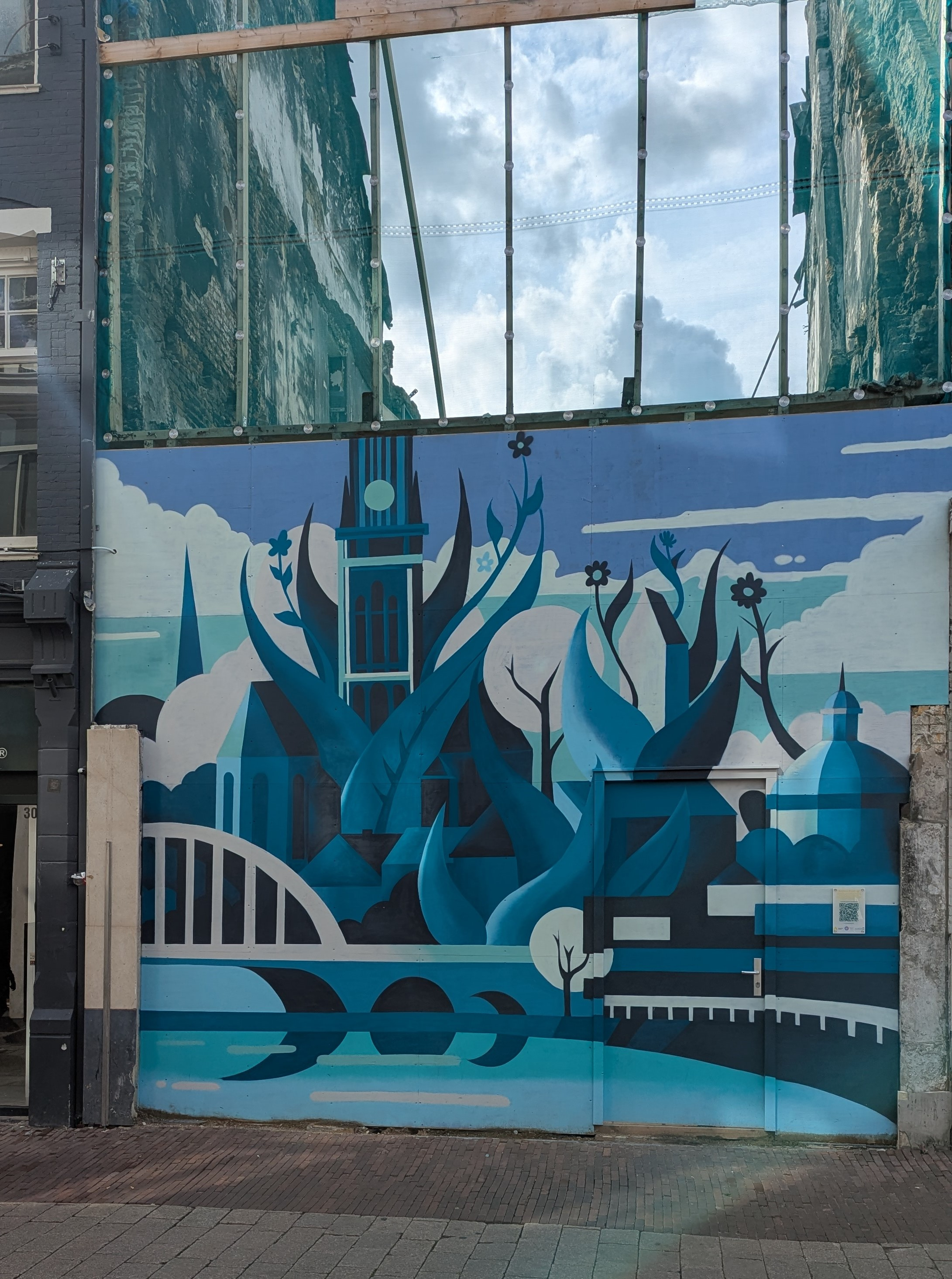
Wall painting 'Arnhem is blooming', an ode to the resilience of the city

On 6 March 2025, a major city fire broke out in Arnhem, Netherlands. The fire destroyed a block of shops and upstairs apartments in the historic city center.

Buildings damaged and gutted by the fire included national monuments and municipal monuments.

== Course ==
At around 03:45 on the night of 6 March 2025, a fire started at a SoLow store in the Jansstraat, and spread to several other historic stores. The fire brigade arrived to the scene with 150-200 men, completely closing off the city center. The fire brigade allowed the entire block between the Jansstraat, Rozemarijnsteeg, Varkensstraat and Munterstraat to burn down in a controlled manner. The block up to the Pauwstraat also suffered damage. About ten historic buildings were affected. Affected stores include Etos, travel agency TUI, and The Body Shop. The homes above the stores in the block also burned down.

The fire was under control at around 1:50 p.m., with no known casualties reported. The Mayor of Arnhem Ahmed Marcouch prematurely ended his vacation to return to Arnhem, following the fire. Several fundraising events were held for the residents affected by the fire, raising over €33,000 together.

On 7 March, asbestos was discovered in buildings damaged by the fire.

== Cause ==
Three suspects were arrested. After initially speculating that the attack was targeted, the police later ruled out the possibility. One of the suspects, a 57-year-old man, had been known to police as a troublemaker prior to the fire, and had previously been evicted from his residence.

== Buildings affected ==
About 25 buildings were destroyed by the fire. Among the burned-out buildings was a Rijksmonument and several municipal monuments.

The fire destroyed several architecturally historical buildings from the 19th and 20th centuries. Jansstraat 24, where the Etos store was located, dates from the 15th century. The buildings were notable for surviving the Battle of Arnhem.

On 19 March, the demolition of the historic buildings' facades began. Several more buildings damaged by the fire were planned to be demolished, with very few of the structures impacted being deemed salvageable.
