= Purple Strategies =

American communications firm

- Industry: Public relations, Advertising, Reputation management
- Founded: 2008
- Founder: Alex Castellanos; Steve McMahon
- Headquarters: Alexandria, Virginia; Chicago; Harrisburg, Pennsylvania; Houston
- Subsidiaries: Citizen2
- Website: purplestrategies.com

Purple Strategies is an American communications firm headquartered in Alexandria, Virginia and founded in 2008. The name Purple Strategies reflects the company's bipartisan blend of strategists from both "blue" and "red" political backgrounds. Purple Strategies also operates a subsidiary, a reputation management firm Citizen2.

== Company overview ==
Purple Strategies is a bipartisan communications firm that offers services in strategic communication, public affairs, issue advocacy, public opinion research, advertising, media relations and new media for corporations, trade associations and non-profit organizations. Past and current clients include BP, United Airlines, NASCAR, the United States Chamber of Commerce and Pharmaceutical Research and Manufacturers of America (PhRMA).

Purple Strategies' principal partners include Republican political strategists Alex Castellanos, Bruce Haynes, and Robin Roberts, as well as Democratic strategists Steve McMahon, John Donovan, and Mark Squier. The company is headquartered in Alexandria, Virginia with additional locations in Chicago, Houston, and Harrisburg, Pennsylvania.

=== Subsidiaries ===
Purple Strategies operates Citizen2, a media company based in Chicago and the Washington, D.C. area specializing in reputation management and branding. Citizen2 developed the "National Hiring Day" campaign for McDonald's in 2012, in partnership with the public relations firm Golin Harris International. The print, radio and social media campaign sought to add 50,000 employees to McDonald's workforce and featured profiles of real McDonald's employees. In 2013, Citizen2 was hired by Coca-Cola to help the company join the national discussion about soft drinks' role in high rates of obesity in the United States. Citizen2 helped Coca-Cola create a television commercial highlighting the company's efforts to address obesity. The ad ran in the U.S. and Europe.

Purple Advocacy is also a subsidiary of Purple Strategies, and specializes in government affairs, including lobbying.

== History ==
Purple Strategies was founded in 2008 by Alex Castellanos and Steve McMahon. Republican consultant and strategist Castellanos merged his strategic communications company, National Media Public Affairs, with McMahon's Democratic firm Issue & Image, to create the bipartisan organization. Bruce Haynes became the managing partner at Purple Strategies. Haynes has explained that the merger was the result of the founding partners routinely meeting each other when pitching to clients. The partners decided they should combine efforts, blending the "blue" and "red" consultancies, to create a "purple" company.

=== Early clients and projects ===
The firm's first major client was the United States Chamber of Commerce; in partnership with the communications firm Powell Tate, Purple Strategies developed the Chamber of Commerce's "Campaign for Free Enterprise" in 2009. This was the largest campaign initiated by the Chamber of Commerce to date, and used advertising, digital outreach and grassroots campaigning to promote free enterprise in the United States.

In 2010, Purple Strategies was hired by BP following the Deepwater Horizon oil spill. Purple Strategies developed online, television, print and radio ads that favorably portrayed BP's cleanup efforts in the Gulf of Mexico.

Cable provider Time Warner Cable hired Purple Strategies in 2010 to develop a response to a rate increase planned by News Corporation, the parent company of Fox Network, for Time Warner Cable's rights to offer the Fox broadcast channel in media markets across the country, including New York City. The resulting interactive campaign, titled "Roll Over or Get Tough", asked Time Warner Cable customers to help decide how the company should respond to the proposed increase. The campaign generated over 800,000 responses and drew media attention for the way that Time Warner Cable handled the dispute.

=== Expansion ===
In 2011, Purple Strategies established Purple Advocacy to focus on government relations including lobbying and advocacy work.

The firm expanded to Chicago in 2012 after hiring Chris Mather, a former communications director for Chicago mayor Rahm Emanuel. Following the company's expansion in Chicago, Purple Strategies was hired by Northwestern University in 2012 to assist with public relations around a planned construction project that had met with opposition from preservation groups.

Purple also operated a research division, Purple Insights. During the 2012 United States presidential election, the division conducted polling in swing states. Following the election, Fordham University'ranked Purple Strategies fifth among 28 polling organizations in an analysis of polling accuracy.

In 2012, Purple Strategies expanded into Pennsylvania, hiring former Pennsylvania House of Representatives member Dante Santoni and opening an office in Harrisburg. In 2013, Purple Strategies acquired the polling firm Momentum Analysis, which is known for its research on "Walmart moms". Momentum Analysis' founder Margie Omero joined Purple Strategies as a managing director of the company's research division, Purple Insights.

In August 2022, Boston-based private equity firm WestView Capital Partners invested in Purple Strategies. Purple's existing leadership remained intact following the transaction.
