= Bruce Haynes (consultant) =

American communications consultant

- Education: Bachelor's degree (1990); Juris Doctor
- Alma mater: Furman University; Francis Marion University; University of South Carolina
- Occupation: Communications consultant
- Known for: Chairman of Public Affairs at Sard Verbinnen & Co.; Managing partner at Purple Strategies

Bruce Haynes is an American communications consultant. He is currently Chairman of Public Affairs, Managing Director and co-head of the Washington, D.C. office for Sard Verbinnen & Co., a global strategic communications and consulting firm.

== Early life ==
Bruce Haynes was born in Florence, South Carolina to Ann and Harold Haynes. He attended Furman University and earned a bachelor's degree from Francis Marion University in 1990. In 1992, while studying law at the University of South Carolina, Haynes was selected as an alternate delegate to the 1992 Republican National Convention.

== Career ==
After graduating law school, Haynes started his career as staff counsel for former governor of South Carolina Carroll A. Campbell Jr. He was next hired by South Carolina representative Bob Inglis to serve as his chief of staff, and later became Inglis' campaign manager during his 1998 U.S. Senate campaign against Ernest Hollings.

Throughout the 2000s, Haynes worked as managing partner and head of public affairs advertising for National Media Public Affairs, based in Alexandria, Virginia. While at National Media Public Affairs, Haynes helped to develop advertisements for Freddie Mac. Additionally, in 2003, Haynes and former Churchill Downs Incorporated vice president of public affairs, Frank Jemley, created the public relations and advertising company Jemley Public Affairs.

In 2008, National Media Public Affairs merged with Issue & Image, a company founded by Steve McMahon and Mark Squier, to form the bipartisan communications firm Purple Strategies. Haynes became the new firm's managing partner. Purple Strategies is a headquartered in Alexandria, Virginia and has worked with clients including BP, Time Warner Cable, the Pharmaceutical Research and Manufacturers of America, and the United States Chamber of Commerce.

In June 2018, Haynes joined Sard Verbinnen & Co., a global strategic communications and consulting firm as vice chairman of public affairs, managing director and co-head of the Washington, D.C. office. Haynes serves the firm's global roster of clients in public affairs, crisis communications, corporate reputation and positioning, mergers and acquisitions, litigation communications and other special situations.

In April 2020, Haynes became chairman of public affairs for Sard Verbinnen & Co. succeeding Ed Gillespie.

== Other activities ==
In 2008, Haynes served as a media consultant to the Republican National Committee's presidential independent expenditure campaign. Additionally, he is a member of the Arthur W. Page Society, the President's Advisory Council of Furman University and serves on the College of Charleston Department of Communications Advisory Council. He has served as a guest political analyst for CNN.com.
