= Citizens United for Research in Epilepsy =

American non-profit organization

CURE Epilepsy
- Founded: 8 September 1998 (27 years ago)
- Type: Nonprofit organization
- Legal status: 501(c)(3)
- Headquarters: Chicago, Illinois
- Services: Raising and granting funds for epilepsy research
- CEO: Beth Lewin Dean
- Website: www.cureepilepsy.org

Citizens United for Research in Epilepsy (CURE Epilepsy) is a parent-founded, research-focused nonprofit committed to finding a cure for epilepsy. It was founded in 1998. It is based in Chicago, Illinois.

CURE Epilepsy invests in foundational science research to expand the understanding of the underlying mechanisms of epilepsy, with the end goal being the discovery of a cure. CURE Epilepsy has raised more than $100 million and funded over 300 epilepsy research projects.

Research funded by the organization has led to breakthroughs in the genetic diagnosis of epilepsy, potential treatments for infantile spasms, and a greater understanding of how to prevent sudden death in epilepsy, among other advances.
