= SoLow =

Dutch retail chain

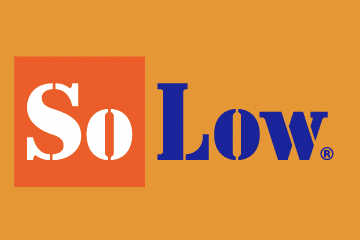
- Industry: Retail
- Genre: Arts and crafts
- Founded: 2003
- Headquarters: Culemborg, Netherlands
- Parent: D&F Commodity Trade BV
- Website: solow.nl

SoLow is a Dutch retail chain that specializes in party supplies, hobby and craft supplies, and other non-food items. The company was founded in 2003 by brothers Danny and François Dame, at that time from a stall at a local market. The parent company of SoLow is therefore also called D&F and is located in Culemborg. As of 2022, the company has 46 branches in the Netherlands and Flanders.

In 2021, private equity fund Vendis Capital acquired the majority stake for at least 15 million euros. With the investment, SoLow wanted to expand, both in the Netherlands and abroad. However, some branches were transferred to the similar retail chain Feela.

In 2025, a large fire started at a branch of SoLow in Arnhem.
