= Jennifer Solow =

American novelist

- Born: Pittsburgh, Pennsylvania, United States
- Education: Winchester Thurston School and the Rhode Island School of Design
- Occupations: Author and entrepreneur
- Writing career
- Notable work: The Booster (2006)

Jennifer Solow is an American novelist, publisher and entrepreneur, and the author of The Aristobrats and The Booster. In 2021 she became the publisher of Edible Hudson Valley, Edible Westchester, Edible Manhattan and Edible Brooklyn. She is the founder of Doorstep Market.

== Early life ==
Born in Pittsburgh, Pennsylvania, Solow is a daughter of architect Donald Solow and Fox Chapel Country Day School teacher Nan Solow. Raised in that city's Squirrel Hill neighborhood, Jennifer Solow graduated from Winchester Thurston School and the Rhode Island School of Design.

== Advertising career ==
Employed in the field of advertising, Solow rose through the ranks to become "the managing partner and creative director of Kirshenbaum Bond in San Francisco," and created advertising campaigns for the Target Corporation, according to the Pittsburgh Post-Gazette. Less than six months after the September 11 attacks in 2001, she resigned from her position to focus on her family and writing.

== Writing career ==
Her first novel was The Booster, which was released by Atria Books in 2007. According to the Pittsburgh Post-Gazette, her "finely crafted novel received a starred review from Publishers Weekly" in 2006.

=== Selected works ===
- Solow, Jennifer (2006). The Booster. New York: Atria. ISBN 0-7432-8183-7.
