= Media consultant =

A media consultant is a marketing agent or public relations executive that is hired by businesses, individuals, NGOs' or political candidates to maintain positive press coverage. Media consultants usually draft press releases to highlight positive achievements of a business, organization, or individual, and prepare subjects for interviews with the media. In politics, media consultants might also create advertisement campaigns to communicate key messages to voters.

A personal media coach is a type of media consultant that focuses more specifically on someone likely to be interviewed by the media, such as a book author, political candidate, corporate officer, or spokesperson. This might include recommendations on what to say, techniques for dealing with difficult questions, delivery of answers and personal presentation if being interviewed on camera.

A media consultant can also be a person or company that enables media organizations to develop their businesses. An example where a consultant would be needed is a company that is moving its print business online.

Consulting firms such as Bain, McKinsey & Company, and Boston Consulting Group have media, technology, and entertainment practices. Media consultants at management consulting firms seek to address issues facing the industry such as strengthening operational efficiency, brand strategy, digital media strategies, and business technology. Media consultants are often employed by businesses to help them manage their media agency relationships and audit their advertising spend.

== Social media ==
Many consultants have entered the area of social media. A social media consultant's work involves advising clients on developing online media campaigns. These campaigns typically include the use of video, blogs, forums and other features commonly seen on social networking sites.

These digital consultants may also assist companies with managing their online presence on blogs and popular social platforms such as Facebook, TikTok, Instagram and X. Engagement with social media can strengthen a brand if strategically managed.
