= Crystal Beach, Texas =

Unincorporated community in Texas, United States

Coordinates: 29°27′26″N 94°38′23″W

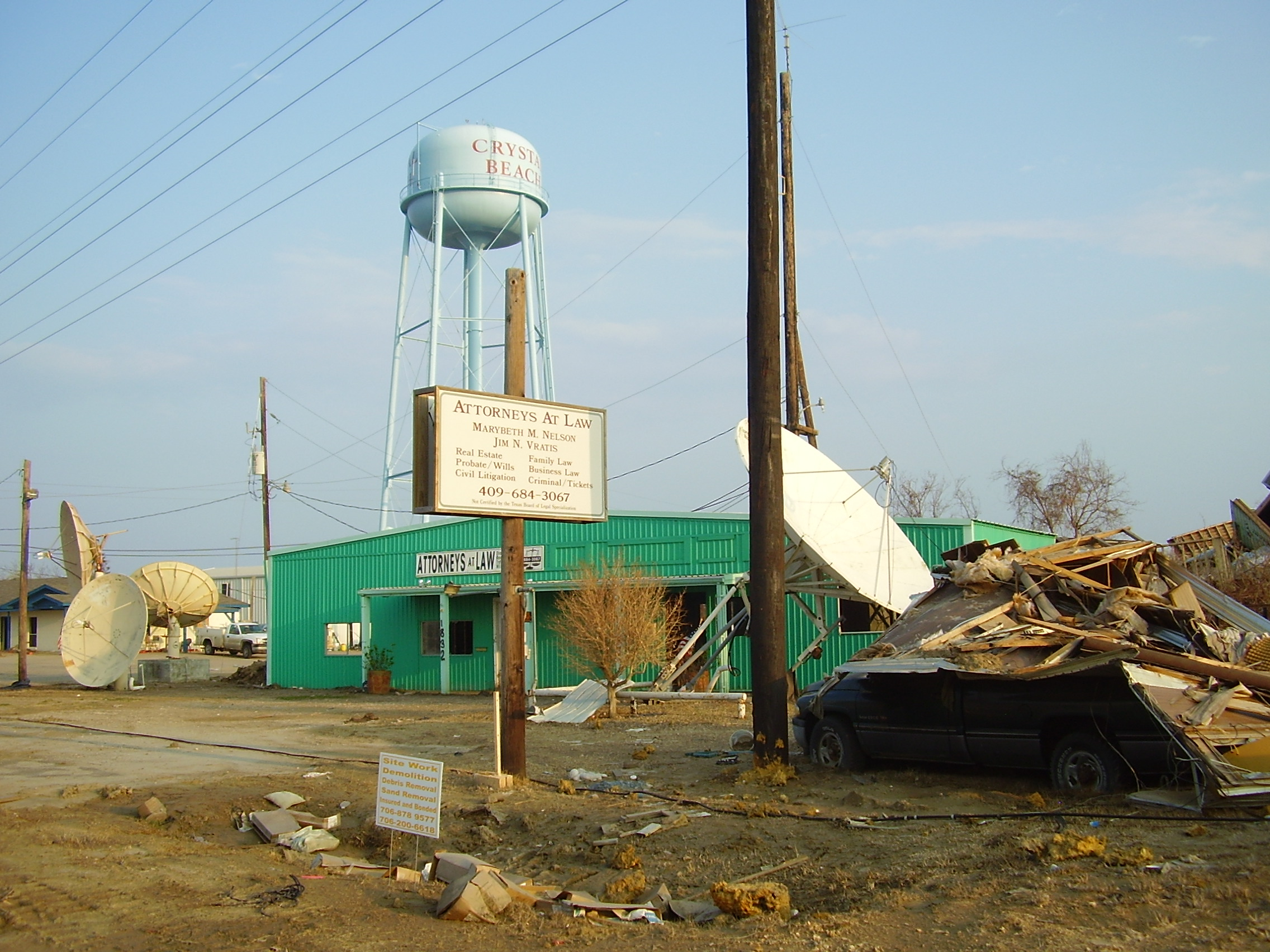
Crystal Beach after Hurricane Ike

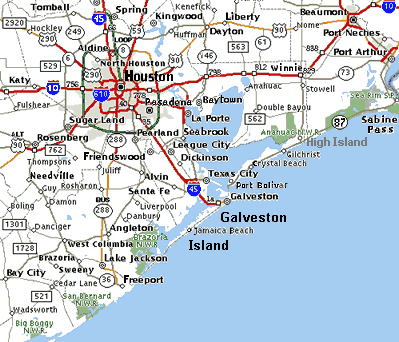
Crystal Beach (center right) on Bolivar Peninsula, southeast of Houston

Crystal Beach is an unincorporated community in the Bolivar Peninsula census-designated place, in Galveston County, Texas, United States. Also known as Patton, Crystal Beach stretches 7 miles (10 km) along Texas State Highway 87 in the middle of Bolivar Peninsula.

Crystal Beach is located along 27 miles of beach on the Bolivar Peninsula. It is a popular destination due to allowing camping and fires, as well as its fishing opportunities. Some fish in the surf, and others on the rocks of the North Jetty. The Rollover Fish Pass has been filled in and can no longer be fished, as of 2020. The pass is named for the practice of ship captains from the days of Spanish rule through Prohibition, who, to avoid the Galveston customs station, rolled barrels of import or export merchandise over that part of the peninsula.

Crystal Beach is served by the Bolivar Chamber of Commerce, which is the official source for business, tourism and government information for the Bolivar Peninsula.

Crystal Beach and the entire Bolivar Peninsula suffered catastrophic damage from Hurricane Ike on September 12–13, 2008. The majority of the area was damaged by a storm surge of over 20 feet, added to the morning high tide, plus higher waves on top.

== Demographics ==
Historical population
Census	Pop.	Note	%±
2000	753		—
2010	893		18.6%
2020	961		7.6%
U.S. Decennial Census; 1850–1900 1910; 1920 1930 1940; 1950 1960 1970; 1980 1990 2000; 2010 2020

== History ==
The sole initial recorded activity was in the Patton community. The Patton Beach post office operated from 1898 to 1900. The Crystal Beach site was settled in the early 20th century. Patton served as a railroad station. When the railroad ended in the early 1940s, the name of the community became "Crystal Beach." The community incorporated in 1971. Four subsequent attempts to disincorporate the municipality occurred in the mid-1980s. The municipality ended in 1987. Afterward, supporters of incorporation and supporters of disincorporation lost and gained control. During 1990 the community, which remained unincorporated, had a full-time population recorded as 787. Other estimates stated that the community had as many as 1,600 full-time residents. Around that time Crystal Beach was the largest Bolivar Peninsula community. Officials estimated that 80% of the property owners of Crystal Beach residents were people who vacationed during holidays, summers, and weekends. In 1990 Crystal Beach had one bank, one hotel, one supermarket, and the headquarters of most of the Bolivar Peninsula real estate agencies.

The community sustained severe damage after Hurricane Ike struck in September 2008; the hurricane obliterated many vacation houses.

=== Hurricane Ike ===
Crystal Beach and the entire Bolivar Peninsula suffered catastrophic damage from Hurricane Ike on the night of September 12–13, 2008. The majority of the area was damaged by a storm surge of over 20 ft, during the high tide of 4:14 a.m., adding 1.5-2.3 ft more height to the storm tide, plus higher waves on top.

Most of the houses were vacation homes, and it had appeared that most of them sustained significant damage. Nearly every house south of Ridgeway was completely destroyed. Carl Griffith, an owner of an exotic game ranch and a former Jefferson County sheriff and judge, said that he saw many newly manufactured cars in the debris. Griffith believed that this indicated that many people were killed in the storm; Griffith explained that people would not likely leave newer cars alone and flee without them.

For several days after the hurricane, a rumor swirled, stating that a tiger roamed the streets after Ike hit, as the storm opened an exotic animal compound. Police found the tiger inside the compound.

After Hurricane Ike the United States Postal Service temporarily relocated Crystal Beach post office box services to Winnie.

== Government and infrastructure ==
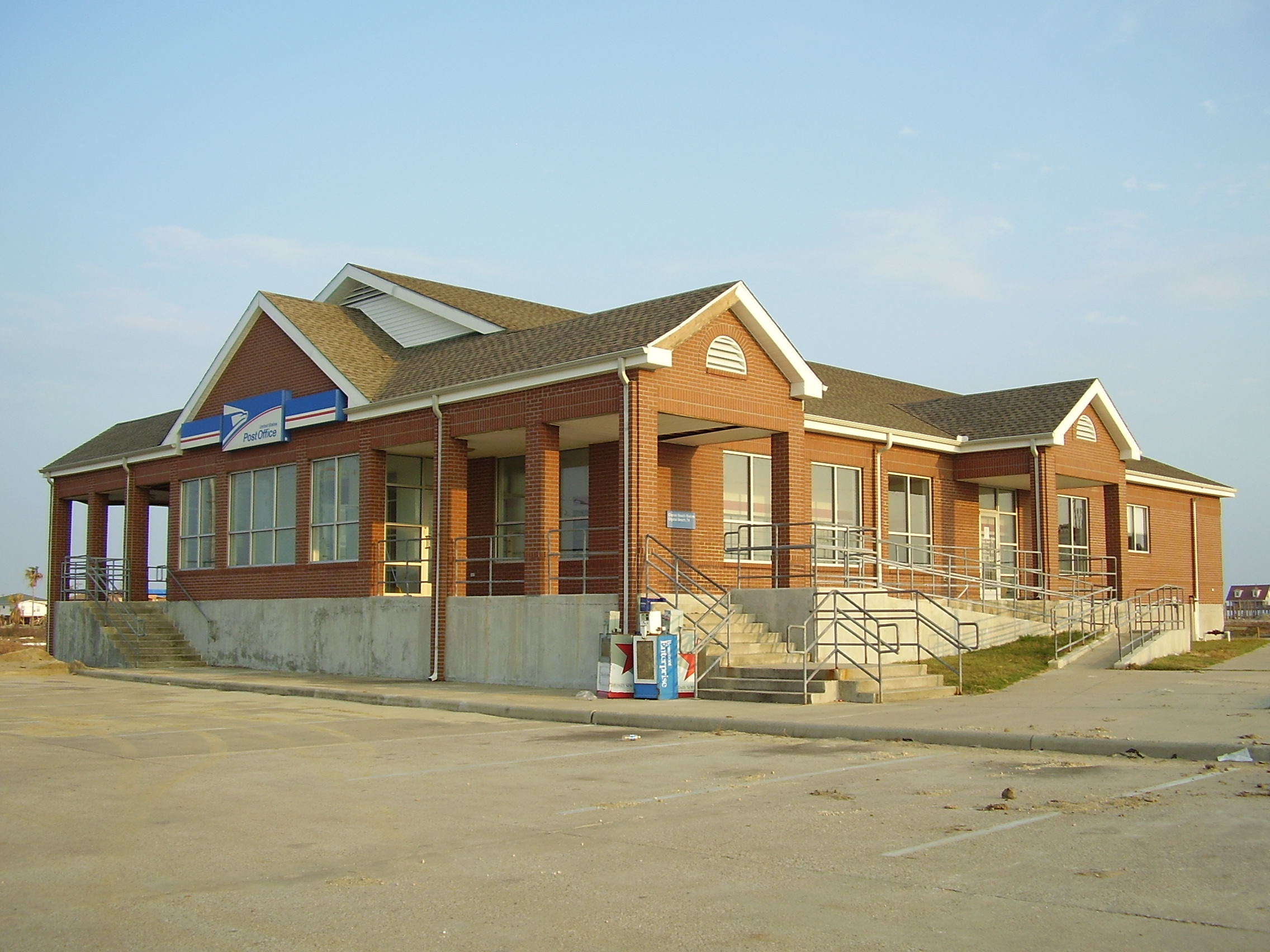
Crystal Beach Station Post Office

The United States Postal Service operates the Crystal Beach Station Post Office at 2000 Texas State Highway 87.

Unincorporated areas in Galveston County receive animal services from the Galveston County Animal Resource Center, an animal shelter operated by the Galveston County Health District in Texas City.

== Education ==
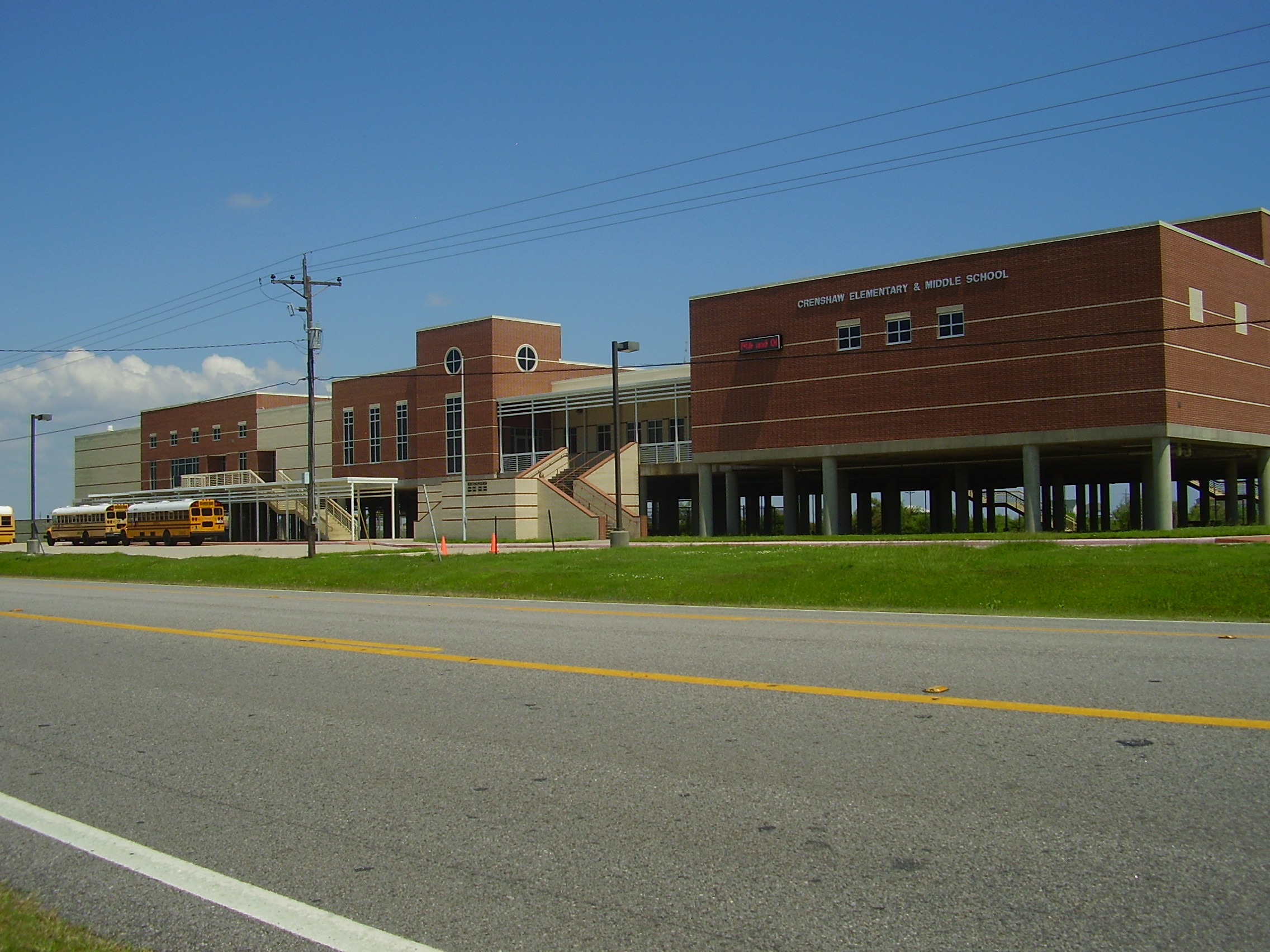
Crenshaw School

Crystal Beach residents are zoned to Galveston Independent School District schools.

Residents attend Crenshaw Elementary and Middle School for grades Kindergarten through 8. The current Crenshaw campus opened in 2005, on land donated by a third party. The 56,000 square feet (5,200 m^{2}) building, designed by Bay Architects, is located at Texas State Highway 87 and Helen Drive. The current Crenshaw school was built off of the ground and as a hurricane shelter. It includes a cafeteria that includes a stage and a gymnasium. Carter Thompson of the Galveston County Daily News wrote "A slight nautical theme shows up in a lobby that resembles a wheelhouse." Prior to the opening of the current campus, two separate campuses housed portions of the Crenshaw school. As of 2020 there are no particular attendance boundaries in GISD, so parents may apply to any school they wish, but only Bolivar Peninsula residents may have school bus service to Crenshaw K-8.

Residents attend Ball High School in Galveston.

As it is within Galveston ISD, Crystal Beach is within the Galveston College service area.

== Parks and recreation ==
The Galveston County Department of Parks and Senior Services operates the Joe Faggert Community Center at 1760 State Highway 87. The county also has Gregory Park along State Highway 87 and Noble Carl Park at 1760 State Highway 87.

== Religion ==
The Roman Catholic Archdiocese of Galveston-Houston maintains the Our Lady By The Sea Chapel and Catholic Center in Crystal Beach. Its service area is the entire peninsula. This site is a part of the Holy Family Parish, which has other sites on Galveston Island.

The site of Our Lady by the Sea formerly housed St. Theresa of Liseaux Mission, built in 1994. It sustained damage during Hurricane Ike in 2008, and due to the damage the archdiocese had it razed.

Between Hurricane Ike and the opening of Our Lady by the Sea, Bolivar residents attended church in Galveston or in Winnie. John Nova Lomax of the Houston Press wrote that the Our Lady church, dedicated in 2010 and on the site of the former St Therese of Lisieux, "effectively consolidates [St Therese of Lisieux] and Port Bolivar's Our Mother of Mercy". Residents opposed to the demolition of Our Mother of Mercy expressed a negative reception to the opening of Our Lady by the Sea.

== See also ==
- Gilchrist, Texas – nearby settlement on the peninsula.
