= Port Bolivar, Texas =

Unincorporated community in Texas, US

Coordinates: 29°22′51″N 94°45′52″W

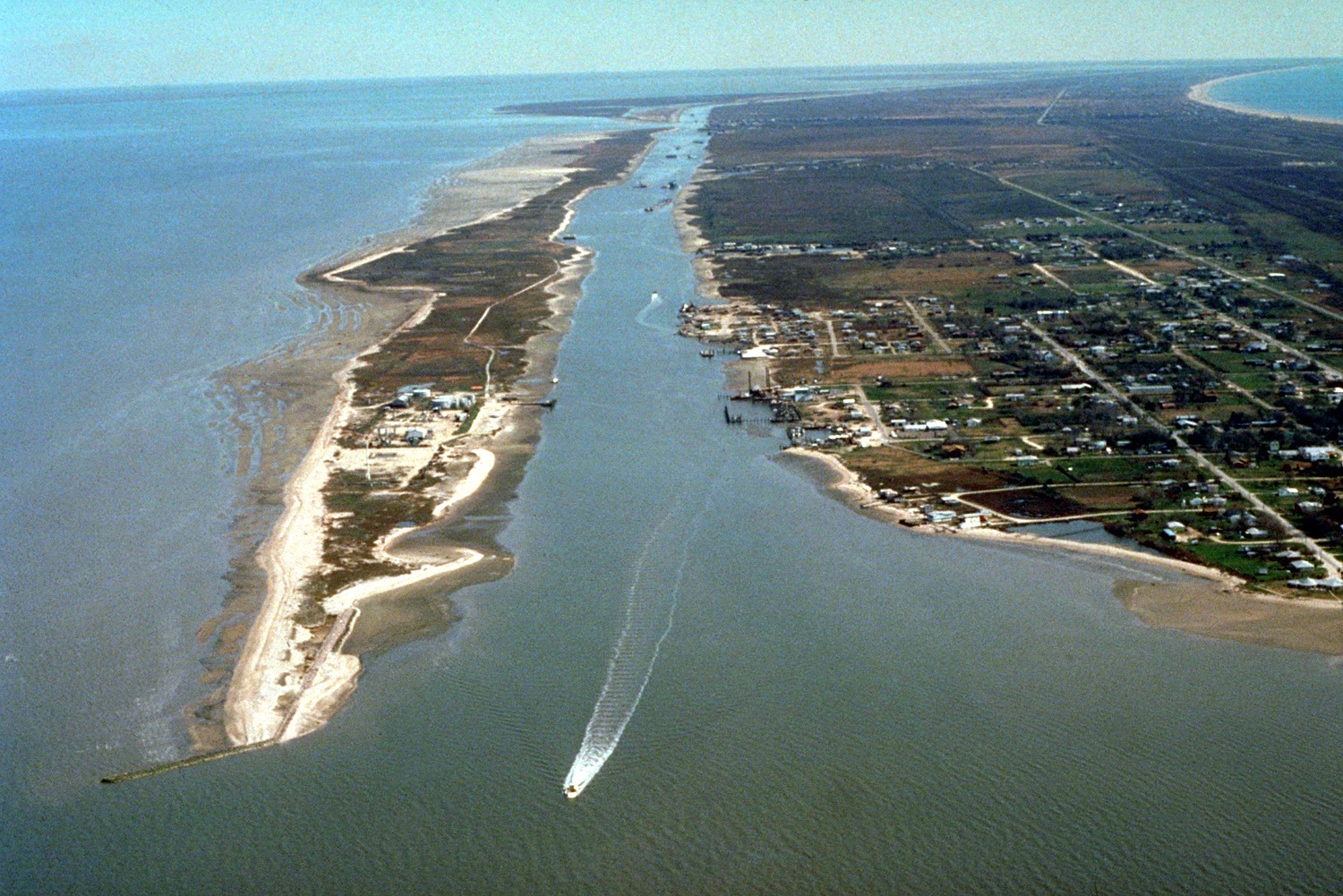
Aerial view of Port Bolivar at the end of the Bolivar Peninsula in 1999. The Gulf Intracoastal Waterway enters Galveston Bay here. Galveston Bay is at left in this photograph. View is to the northeast.

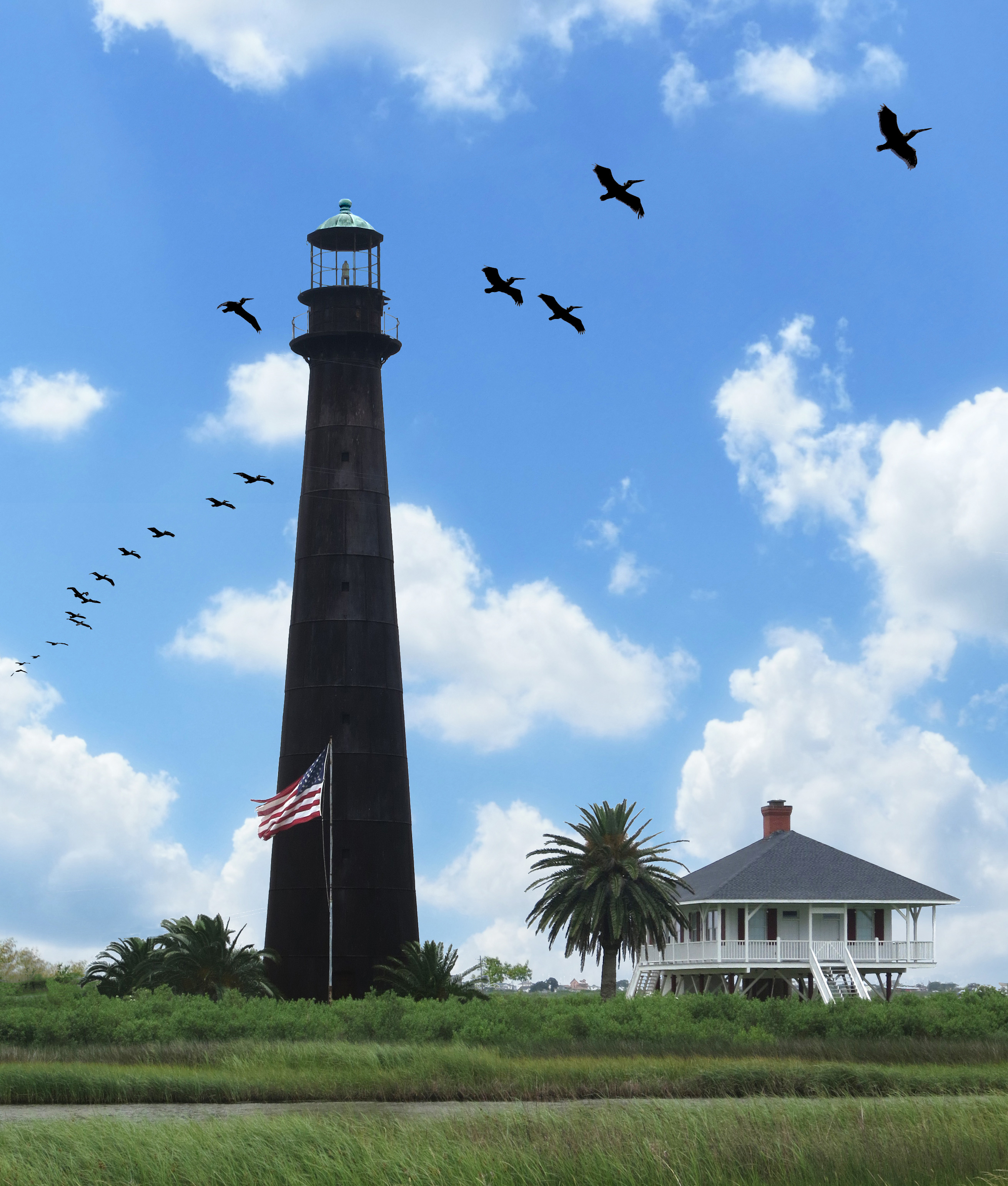
Bolivar Lighthouse -- Point Bolivar

Port Bolivar (/ˈbɒlɪvər/ BOL-i-vər) is an unincorporated community located on the northern shore of the western tip of the Bolivar Peninsula, separated from Galveston Island by the entrance to Galveston Bay. The Bolivar Peninsula itself is a census-designated place, in Galveston County, Texas, United States, and part of the Houston–Sugar Land–Baytown metropolitan area. The entire peninsula was severely damaged during Hurricane Ike on September 13, 2008; re-building efforts were still continuing as late as 2013.

The US Census does not consider Port Bolivar as a separate community, so any population numbers are estimates from unofficial sources. The estimate suggested by City-Data was 1,349 as of 2013. One real estate site suggested 1,477 as of 2014, while another indicated 1,907 as of July 1, 2015.

The community is home to the historic Bolivar Lighthouse, which once guided ships entering Galveston Bay.

== History ==
In 1819, James Long based his operations in the area where Port Bolivar would eventually be located. Undeterred by the Spanish presence, Long quickly began raising money to equip a second expedition to revitalize the failed republic of Texas. He joined refugees from the first expedition on the Bolivar Peninsula in April 1820, bringing his pregnant wife Jane and 300 troops. Though Long restored elements of the former government, the expedition stalled for more than a year as men began to desert. On October 4, 1821, Long and his troops seized Presidio La Bahía, but Spanish troops forced the expedition to surrender four days later

In 1838, Samuel D Parr surveyed the land, and it was granted to him by the Republic of Texas, to be called Parrsville. It changed hands as Archibald Wynns and William Lawrence bought the land and developed it. The land was later bought by a company and renamed to Port Bolivar in 1893.

Fort Travis is on the southern shore of the Bolivar Peninsula, adjacent to Port Bolivar. Originally the site of the Confederate Fort Green, with a different Fort Travis located on Galveston Island, this Fort Travis started construction in 1898 and adopted the name from the Galveston Island fort. The new fort had its own railroad spur.

The 1915 Galveston hurricane damaged Port Bolivar, and its port was mostly not rebuilt.

Until the Second World War, the Gulf, Colorado and Santa Fe Railway served the length of the peninsula, extending as far west as Port Bolivar, and provided a ferry service to Galveston for railcars. In 1942, the rail service was cut back to High Island, 28 miles (45 km) east, where the Bolivar Peninsula expands onto the full mainland. The rails on the Bolivar Peninsula were scrapped for the war effort.

After Hurricane Ike, the United States Postal Service temporarily relocated Port Bolivar post office box services to Winnie, 18 miles (29 km) north of High Island.

In 1968, filming began in Port Bolivar on the made-for-television movie, My Sweet Charlie. Starring Patty Duke and Al Freeman Jr., the film focused on the grudging friendship that develops between two fugitives; an outcast, pregnant young white woman, and a black lawyer accused of murder. The actors themselves were targeted for harassment by some local residents, and filming was plagued with problems until then-governor, John Connally, intervened and worked with local authorities to stop harassment of the production company and the actors.

== Transportation ==
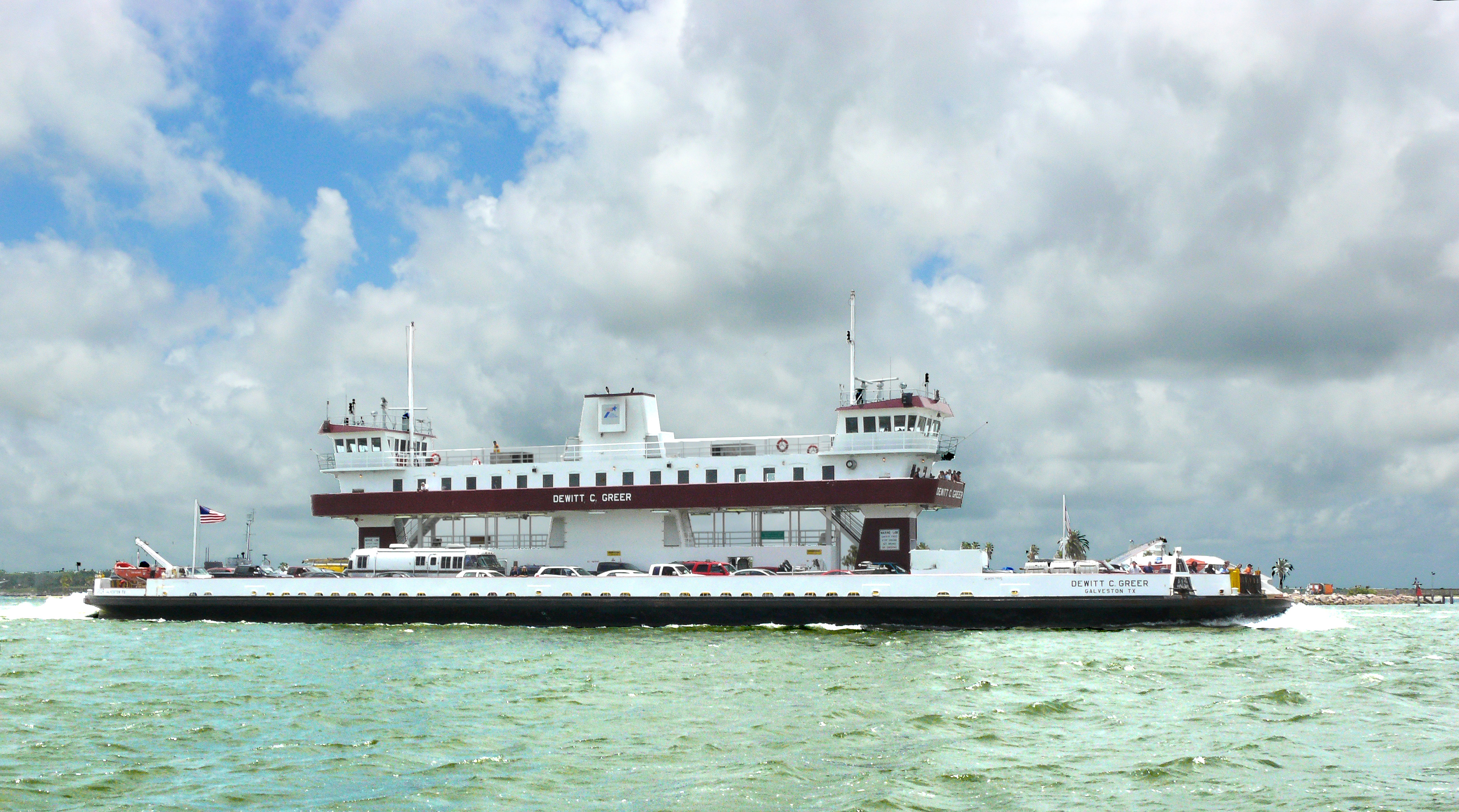
Bolivar Ferry

Ferry service is provided by the Texas Department of Transportation between Port Bolivar and Galveston. The Galveston-Port Bolivar ferry can accommodate vehicles as heavy as 80,000 pounds, and as long as 65 feet, as high as 13.5 feet and as wide as 8.5 feet. The ferry was closed because of Hurricane Ike but re-opened on November 11, 2008.

== Education ==
Port Bolivar residents are zoned to Galveston Independent School District schools.

Residents attend Crenshaw Elementary and Middle School for grades Pre-K3 through 8 on the peninsula. Residents attend Ball High School in Galveston. As of 2020 there are no particular attendance boundaries in GISD so parents may apply to any school they wish, but only Bolivar Peninsula residents may have school bus service to Crenshaw K-8.

The Crenshaw school was located in Port Bolivar until it was damaged by Hurricane Ike. A resident of Crystal Beach, 10 miles (16 km) east of Port Bolivar, donated land there for a new Crenshaw campus, which opened in 2005.

Galveston ISD (and therefore Port Bolivar) is assigned to Galveston College in Galveston.

== Parks and recreation ==
The Galveston County Department of Parks & Cultural Services, that includes Senior Services, operates the Bolivar Community Center, 1802 Madison Avenue, the Fort Travis Seashore Park at 900 State Highway 87, and the Pilsner Boat Ramp.

== Government and infrastructure ==
The United States Postal Service operates the Post Office at 2500 Broadway Avenue, Port Bolivar, TX 77650 - 0736. There is no home delivery on the Bolivar peninsula, only rural delivery.

Unincorporated areas in Galveston County receive animal services from the Galveston County Animal Resource Center, an animal shelter operated by the Galveston County Health District in Texas City.

Unincorporated areas in Galveston County receive emergency medical services from the Galveston Area Ambulance Authority (GAAA), also operated by the health district.

== Religion ==
The Roman Catholic Archdiocese of Galveston-Houston maintains the nearby Our Lady By The Sea Chapel and Catholic Center in Crystal Beach. Its service area is the entire peninsula. This site is a part of the Holy Family Parish, which has other sites on Galveston Island.

Our Mother of Mercy Church established circa 1950, was previously in Port Bolivar. John Nova Lomax of the Houston Press wrote that the church "was the site of many marriages and funerals for generations of Bolivarians." It closed after Hurricane Ike in 2008. At the end of its life, its congregation numbered 75, although in summer months vacationers also attended church there. Lomax described it as "a dowdy, declining parish". Archbishop Joseph Fiorenza had it razed, despite the lack of damage from the hurricane. The archdiocese argued that keeping the structure would cause further expenses, and that future weather issues could damage the building. Lomax wrote "the archdiocese viewed the church as old and in the way".

Between Hurricane Ike and the opening of Our Lady by the Sea, Bolivar residents attended church in Galveston or in Winnie. John Nova Lomax of the Houston Press wrote that the Our Lady church, dedicated in 2010 and on the site of the former St Therese of Lisieux, "effectively consolidates [St Therese of Lisieux in Crystal Beach] and [Our Mother of Mercy]". Residents opposed to the demolition of Our Mother of Mercy expressed a negative reception to the opening of Our Lady by the Sea.
