= Battery Davis =

Battery Davis may refer to:

- Battery Davis, a coastal artillery battery at Fort Funston, San Francisco, California, United States
- Battery Richmond P. Davis, a coastal artillery battery at Fort Travis, Galveston, Texas, United States
