= Fort Travis Seashore Park =

- Fort Travis
- U.S. National Register of Historic Places
- Texas State Antiquities Landmark
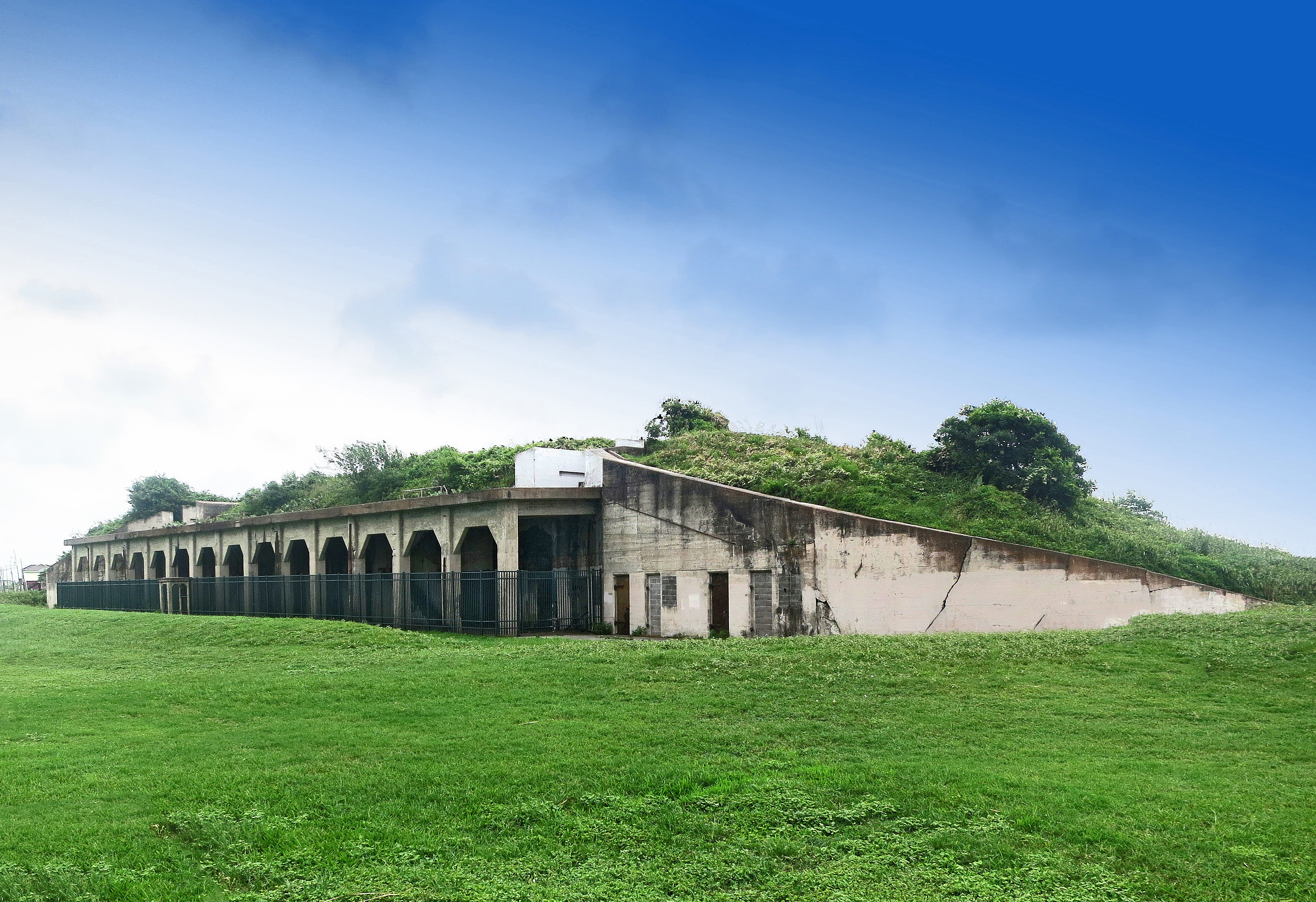
- Fort Travis on Bolivar Peninsula

- Location within Texas Location within the United States
- Location: SH 87 at Loop 108, Port Bolivar, Texas
- Coordinates: 29°21′53″N 94°45′29″W
- Area: 70 acres (28 ha)
- Built: 1898
- NRHP reference No.: 05000247
- TSAL No.: 8200001368

Significant dates
- Added to NRHP: March 30, 2005
- Designated TSAL: January 1, 1984

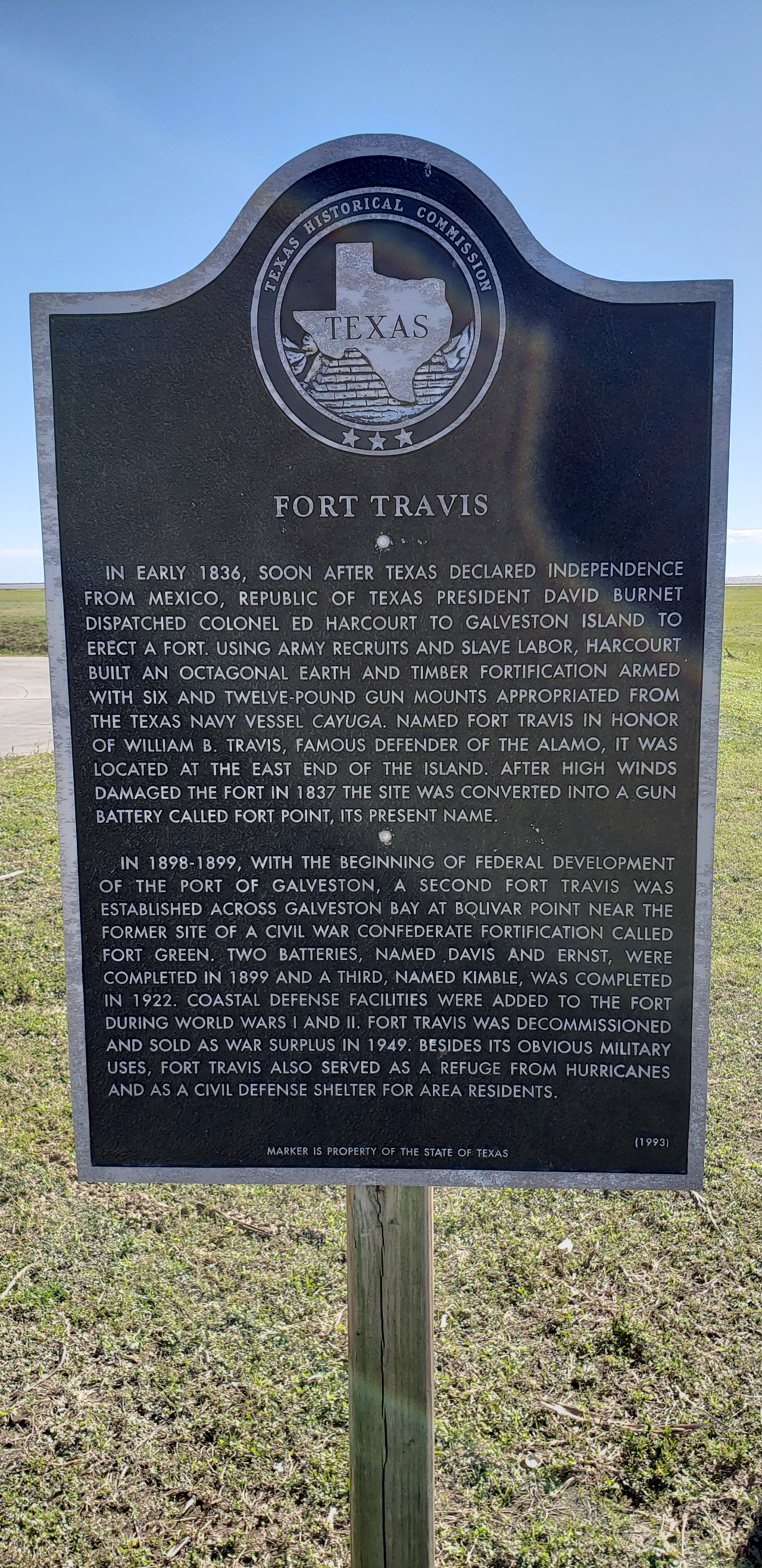
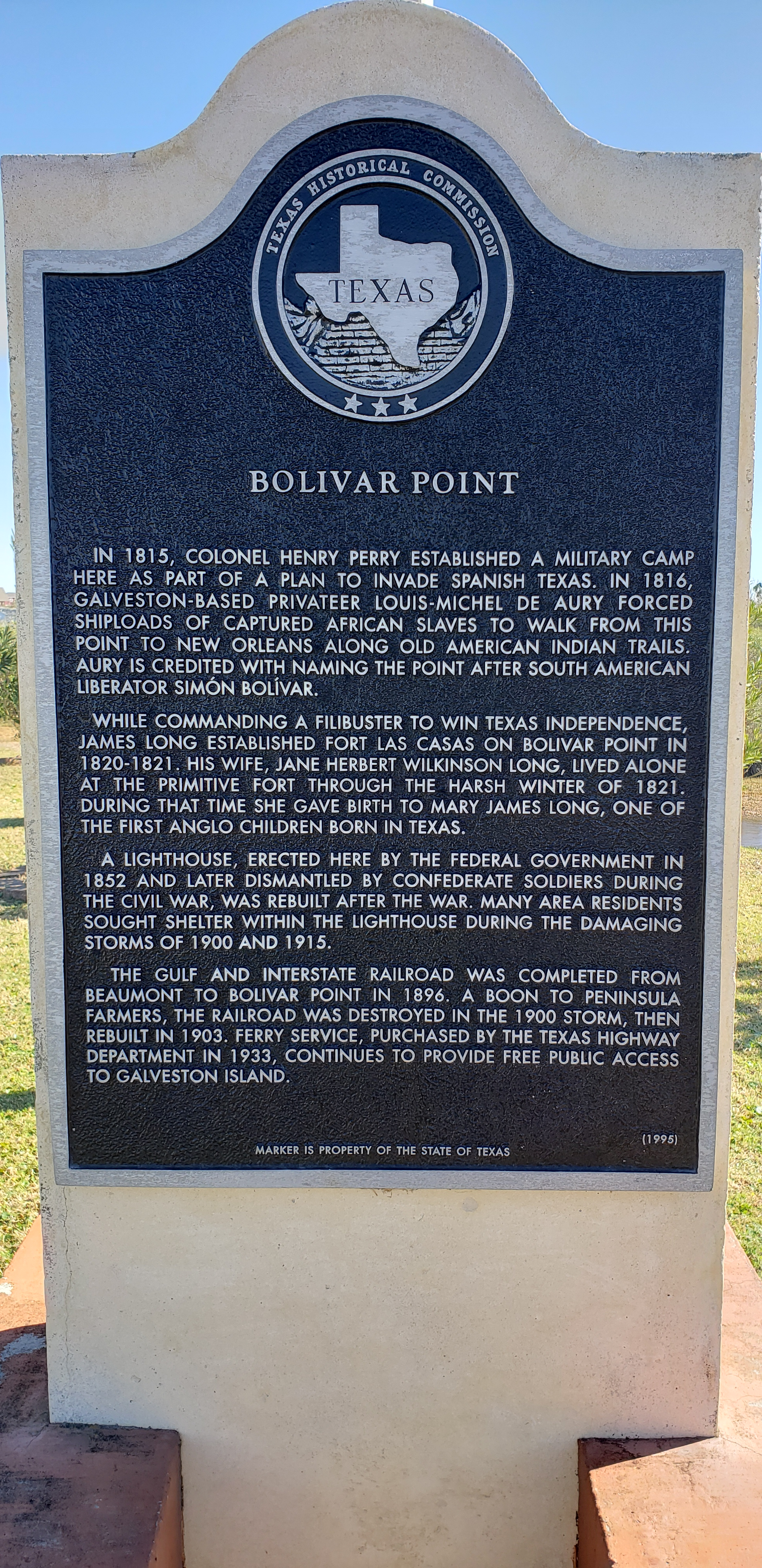
Historical markers for Fort Travis (left) and Bolivar Point (right)
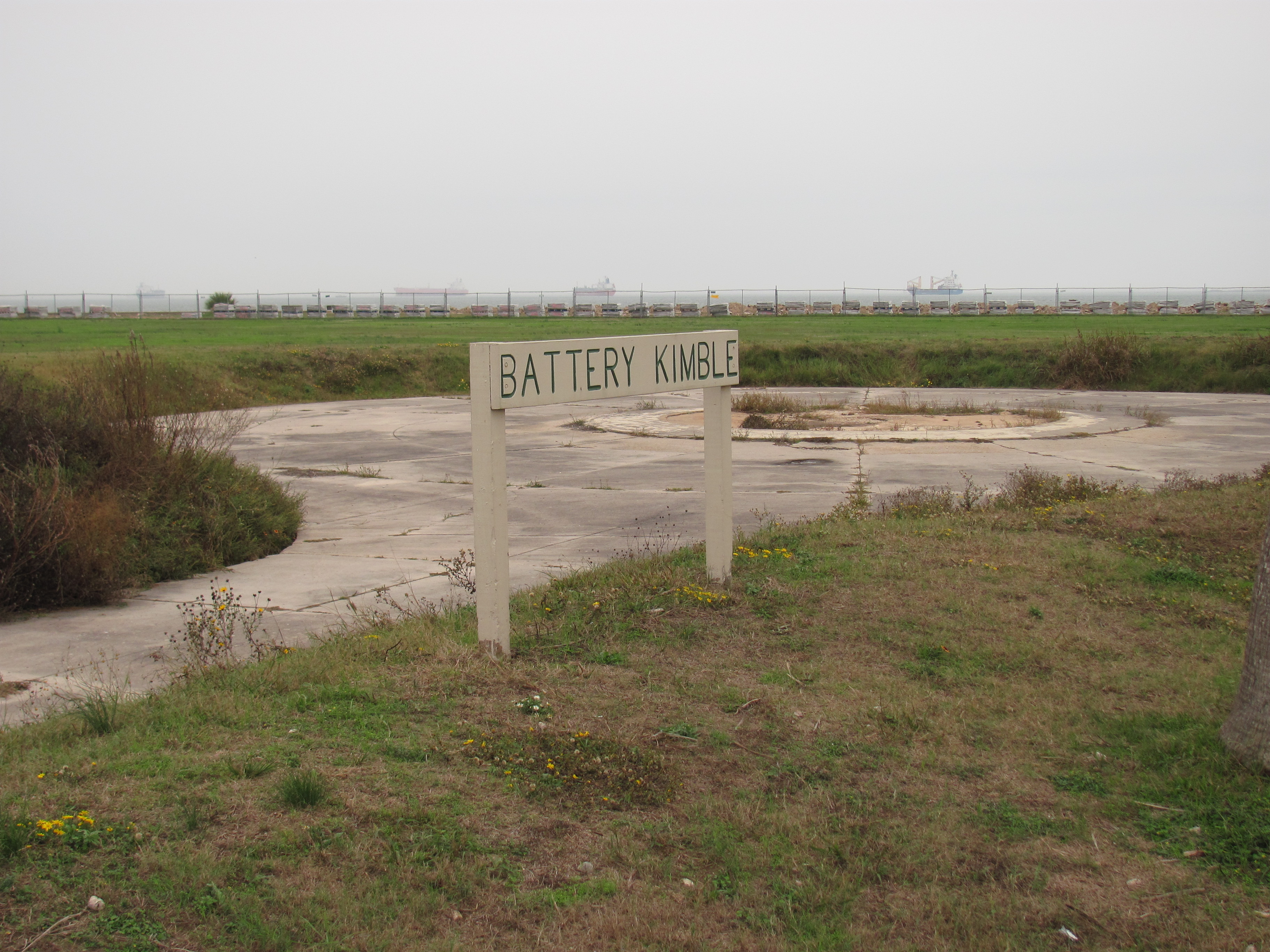
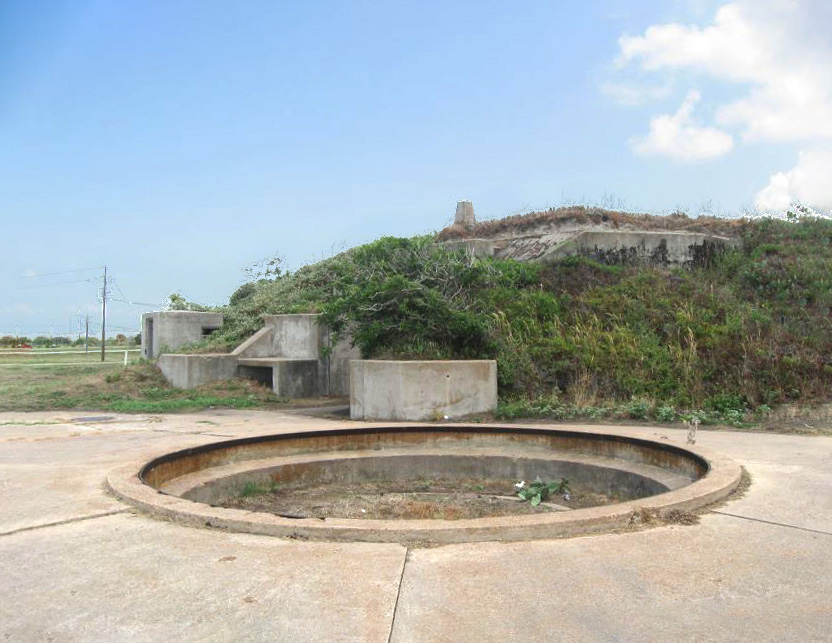
Battery Kimble (left) and 236 (right)

Fort Travis Seashore Park is also the historic Fort Travis, a 60 acres (24 ha) military site with bunkers. The park is located in an area known as Bolivar Point, on the extreme west side of the Bolivar Peninsula in Galveston County, Texas.

== Early history ==
Mexican manuscript maps from 1816 show the location of campomentos by Jean Joseph Amable Humbert and Henry Perry. Francisco Xavier Mina built earthworks at Point Bolivar in 1816. In 1818, Dr. James Long led 300 men in an attempt to liberate Spanish Texas. He established fortifications here in August 1819, known as Fort Las Casas, before proceeding inland. During the winter of 1820-1821, Long's wife, Jane Herbert Wilkinson Long, remained behind with one child and one servant. Giving birth to a daughter, Jane became known as "The Mother of Texas". Samuel D. Parr started a settlement in 1838 that would become Port Bolivar. The original Fort Travis was located on the east end of Galveston. The present location was the Confederate Fort Green

In 1872 Bolivar Point Lighthouse was constructed north of Fort Travis.

== History ==
Construction of Fort Travis began on April 8, 1898, and was completed in October 1899. The fort was named in honor of William B. Travis. The federal government purchased 97 acres (39 ha) in 1898 and completed Batteries Ernst and Davis. After the 1900 Galveston hurricane a 17 feet (5.2 m) seawall was built for storm protection. Battery Kimball was built in 1925 and Battery No. 236 was completed in 1943. Armament consisted of two twelve-inch guns on Barbette carriages and three-inch rapid-fire guns. In 1949 the installation was declared surplus and sold. In 1973 the Galveston County Commissioners Court purchased the site for use as a public park

== Batteries ==
Battery Davis was built in 1898, and named after Lieutenant Thomas Davis, killed in 1847 during the Mexican-American War. This battery contained two eight-inch disappearing guns. Battery Ernst was built in 1898 and named after Lieutenant Rudolph Ernst, killed in 1847 during the Mexican-American War. This battery contained three pedestal guns with searchlights. Battery Kimble was built between August 1917 and April 1922, and named after Major Edwin R. Kimble, killed during WWI. This battery contained twelve-inch guns with a range of 17 miles. Battery 236 was built at the start of WWII. This battery contained two six-inch guns within a casement that included a power plant, magazines, fire control, and crew quarters. During the war, 2500 troops were stationed at the fort.

== Park ==
The park and playground are located within the boundaries of the historic Fort Travis and are under the jurisdiction of the Galveston County Department of Parks & Cultural Services. There are several amenities such as cabanas (6), camping areas, three covered picnic areas, and three wetland overlooks.

== NRHP ==
The site was added to the National Register of Historic Places in Galveston County on March 30, 2006.

== See also ==
- Fort Crockett
- Seacoast defense in the United States
- Board of Fortifications
