= Rollover Pass =

Coordinates: 29°30′32″N 94°30′02″W

Rollover Pass (Gilchrist, Galveston County, Texas), also called Rollover Fish Pass, was a strait that linked Rollover Bay and East Bay with the Gulf of Mexico in extreme southeastern Galveston County. It has been closed by filling it in with dirt. Rollover Pass was opened in 1955 by the Texas Game and Fish Commission to improve local fishing conditions. Seawater was introduced into East Bay to promote vegetation growth, and to provide access for marine fish to spawn and feed. The name came from the days of Spanish rule, when barrels of merchandise would be rolled over that part of the peninsula to avoid excise tax. The Pass is about 1600 feet long and 200 feet wide.

The Rollover Pass area is a popular location for fishing, bird watching, and family recreation activities. Parking and camping was available on all four quadrants along the Pass, and handicapped or elderly persons were able to fish while sitting in their vehicles. Since 2013 it has been the subject of lawsuits over access and ownership.

== Technical details ==
Rollover Pass is part of a low-elevation area and was subject to overflow during high tides or storms. A man-made strait was cut through private property on the Bolivar Peninsula and linked the Gulf of Mexico with Rollover Bay and East Bay on the upper Texas coast in eastern Galveston County. Located on property which was owned by the Gulf Coast Rod, Reel and Gun Club and managed by the Gilchrist Community Association, the Pass was widened to allow more water flow in 1955 by the Texas Game and Fish Commission when it was granted an easement by the property owners. The intent was to increase bay water salinity, promote growth of submerged vegetation, and help marine fish to and from spawning and feeding areas in the bay.

The Pass was about 1600 feet long and 200 feet wide. Large cement walls framed the Gulf side (southeast of Texas Highway 87) and steel bulkheads contained the sides of the Rollover Bay side northwest of the highway.

Rollover Pass earned its name from the practice of smugglers who from the days of Spanish rule through prohibition, avoided the Galveston customs station by rolling barrels of import or export merchandise (i.e., whiskey and rum) over the narrowest part of the peninsula. A Texas Historical Marker, Number 7166, was erected in 1963 but was damaged by Hurricane Ike in 2008. Though FEMA paid for the restoration of the marker, Galveston County blocked it from happening. However, a portion of the marker is still visible and several lines of text refer to the action of the smugglers.

The Rollover Pass area is a popular location for fishing and birding. Visitors come from all over the U.S. to camp, fish, and enjoy family recreation activities. Parking and camping were available on all four quadrants of the property along the Pass, and handicapped or elderly persons were able to fish while sitting in their vehicle. Wading and boat fishing are still possible in the area now, and Bolivar beach regulations apply.

A unique feature of Rollover Pass was the constantly changing water flow which brought a great variety of marine life through the area. Incoming tides brought in salt water and organisms within, while outgoing tides not only carried them out again but also contained brackish or fresh water species.

Marine life seen at Rollover Pass, and the bay and gulf surrounding it, includes blacktip sharks, red drum, black drum, speckled sea trout, flounder, sheephead, ladyfish or skipjacks, gafftop sail catfish, hardhead catfish, ribbonfish, needlefish, tripletail, Spanish mackerel, jack crevalle, tarpon, pompano, croaker, sand trout, whiting, mullet, mud minnows, shad or menhaden, dogfish, brown shrimp, white shrimp, sea otters, blue crabs, stone crabs, and fiddler crabs. Endangered species have also been sighted there, specifically green turtles, loggerhead turtles, and the American eel, and sea horses.

Alligators and gar are also seen in the area, especially during heavy rains. Alligators travel from the back bayous and ponds into the salt water so that any parasites on their hide can be cleaned off.

Freshwater runoff from surrounding rivers, bayous and diversionary canals, especially the Needmore Diversion, drain into the Galveston Bay complex. Much of the water going into East Bay via the Intracoastal Waterway from the neighboring counties of Chambers and Jefferson drained to the Gulf through Rollover Pass. This allowed floodwaters to escape during storms.

The Rollover Pass and Rollover Bay area is a significant winter destination for many migrant bird species coming down from the northern states. It is named as a destination point by several birding organizations and in the Texas Park and Wildlife Department Bolivar Loop map. In addition, the Rollover Pass area is a federally protected critical habitat for the piping plover, an endangered species.

== Hurricane Ike ==
On the morning of September 13, 2008, Hurricane Ike came ashore near Galveston, Texas. The storm surge associated with Hurricane Ike devastated the adjoining coastal communities of Gilchrist (northeast from Rollover Pass) and Caplen (southwest from Rollover Pass) along with most of the Bolivar Peninsula.

As of 2014, homes and businesses have been rebuilt in the area, new residents are settling in, and visitors once again are able to travel through that section of Highway 87. The Rollover Pass bridge has two lanes open instead of the original three. But Texas Historical Marker Number 7166 has yet to be replaced at the Pass. FEMA paid for the Marker to be replaced and the County stopped the process.

In mid-September 2019 Tropical Storm Imelda dumped over 43 inches of water in the southeast Texas area within several days. The residents of the Gilchrist area voiced concerns to the Galveston County commissioners and judge on September 23 that closing Rollover Pass would divert significant quantities of flood waters, much from neighboring counties, onto or through previously dry areas. They also reminded the county that the property takeover and eminent domain issues were still being litigated in appeals court.

On September 30, 2019, chain link fencing was erected by a contractor at the direction of the Texas General Land Office and Galveston County on the properties surrounding Rollover Pass. This prohibited access to the land area by the public.

== Lawsuits and Legislation ==
In May 2009 the 81st Texas legislature in regular session passed Senate Bill 2043. A companion bill was House Bill 3986. This authorized the commissioner of the Texas General Land Office to close or modify certain man-made passes if funds were appropriated by the legislature.

Subsequent actions by the GLO and Galveston County prompted the following court filings:

UNITED STATES DISTRICT COURT, SOUTHERN DISTRICT OF TEXAS, GALVESTON DIVISION

CIVIL ACTION NO. 3:13-CV-00126

On April 19, 2013, the Gulf Coast Rod, Reel and Gun Club, Inc. and the Gilchrist Community Association filed a lawsuit in the U.S. District Court, Southern District of Texas, Galveston Division, against Jerry Patterson, Commissioner; the Texas General Land Office; the U.S. Army Corps of Engineers; Col. Christopher W. Sallese, District Engineer, Galveston District, U.S. Army Corps of Engineers; Lt. Gen. Thomas P. Bostick, Commander and Chief of Engineers, U.S. Army Corps of Engineers; and John M. McHugh, Secretary of the Army.

The lawsuit was amended on January 13, 2014 to include additional assertions not discovered until after the original had been filed.

The private property owners Gulf Coast Rod, Reel and Gun Club, and the GCA which manages the Pass property, filed this suit to protect the Pass from being filled in with dirt and closed completely, which would decimate an already storm-ravaged area and cause extreme hardship to restaurants, retail stores, bait shops, and other businesses relying on tourism, and homeowners trying to rebuild after the huge storm surge from Hurricane Ike. Ike was a Category 2 hurricane making landfall on the northeast end of Galveston Island, about 18 miles from Gilchrist, on September 13, 2008.

Some of the concerns of both sides are: private property rights; the best fishing location for handicapped persons on the Texas coast; government coercion; beach erosion; siltation of the Gulf Intracoastal Waterway; freshwater diversion; and economic effects.

Issues listed in the original lawsuit included: the GLO has no ownership rights to the property; false representation of data to obtain a federal U.S. Army Corps of Engineers permit to close the Pass; violations of the U.S. Constitution; violations of Environmental Policy, Clean Water and Rehabilitation Act requirements; failure by the USACE to analyze impacts of actions by those closing the Pass; failure to perform analyses of alternatives in the best interest of the public and socioeconomic impact; Rehabilitation Act discrimination against mobility impaired persons by not providing any alternate accessible place; discrimination against disabled persons in violation of the Americans with Disabilities Act; failure to consider and incorporate changes from Texas' recent judicial decision regarding public vs. private beaches; failure to address alternate structures such as jetties or groins to control sediment; and declaratory relief or injunction to prevent closure of Rollover Pass by the GLO

An additional study by Lawrence Dunbar, Professional Engineer, has highlighted severe discrepancies in the money calculations by the GLO and their consultant Taylor Engineering for dredging the Intracoastal Waterway.

GALVESTON COUNTY, TEXAS, CIVIL COURT #2

CIVIL CASE NUMBER CV76026

On March 28, 2016 a Petition in Condemnation (OCA) was filed in Galveston County Civil Court to start eminent domain proceedings which would take the private property on which Rollover Pass is located. The case number is CV76026, plaintiff County of Galveston, Texas, defendant Gulf Coast Rod, Reel and Gun Club, Inc. The Gilchrist Community Association was added on as a defendant also. As of June 2017 various hearings, motions and discovery proceedings have taken place and a jury trial was scheduled for June 12, 2017 but did not occur.

All documents filed in the court may be seen by going to the Galveston County Civil Court Records and searching by case number CV76026.

In August 2017 the County Court at Law No. 2, Galveston County, Texas issued a Writ of Possession to take the property. In the months thereafter, the county provided minimal maintenance services and the public was allowed continued access as per Bolivar beach regulations.

In March 2018 an appeal was filed in the Court of Appeals, 14th District of Texas, Houston by the Gilchrist Community Association against the County of Galveston, Texas; Case No. 14-17-00681-CV.

Issues presented included the following: 1. The County Court at Law erred in holding that the Gilchrist Community Association lacked standing; and 2. The County of Galveston lacked the statutory authority to obtain property by eminent domain when the purpose was to substitute the county's eminent domain authority for the non-existent power of the General Land Office of Texas.

== Video ==
In December 2013 a video was produced and released by The Electric Theater Radio Hour in Galveston, Texas. This video, entitled "Rollover Pass battles Patterson & Galveston County on eminent domain threat" (sic) is hosted by George Lee, who interviews Ted Vega, president of the Gilchrist Community Association. It outlines the conflict between the GCA and elected state and county officials, specifically Jerry Patterson, former commissioner of the Texas General Land Office; Mark Henry, county judge of Galveston County; and Ryan Dennard, former commissioner of Precinct 1 in Galveston County (term expired 2016) which includes Rollover Pass.

Photos by outdoor author and photographer Ed Snyder and others as well as artwork from young local area students are featured in the video and it can be viewed on You Tube.
