= High Island, Texas =

- Unincorporated community
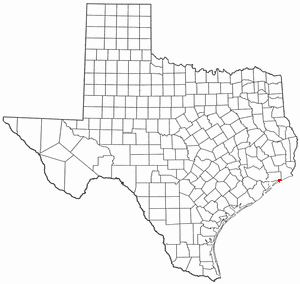
- Location of High Island, Texas
- Coordinates: 29°34′01″N 94°23′37″W
- Country: United States
- State: Texas
- County: Galveston
- Settled: 1845

Area
  - Total: 16.68 sq mi (43.2 km^{2})
  - Land: 16.19 sq mi (41.9 km^{2})
  - Water: 0.49 sq mi (1.3 km^{2})
- Elevation: 38 ft (11.6 m)

Population (2000)
  - Total: 500
  - Density: 29.3/sq mi (11.3/km^{2})
- Time zone: UTC-6 (Central (CST))
  - Summer (DST): UTC-5 (CDT)
- ZIP code: 77623
- Area code: 409
- FIPS code: 48-65564
- GNIS feature ID: 1346420

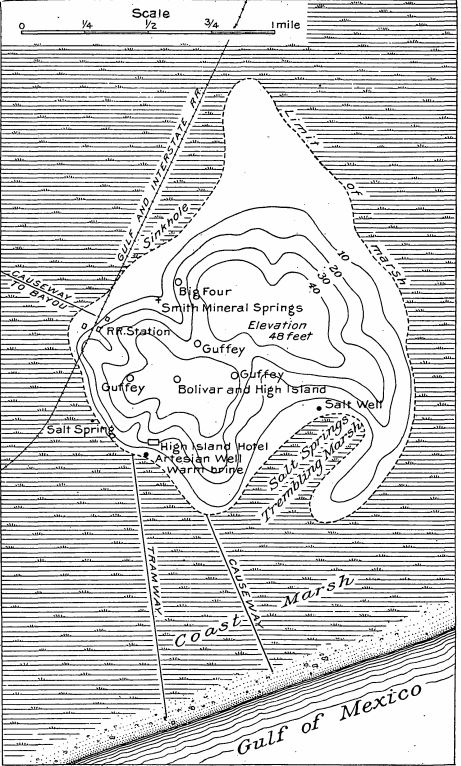
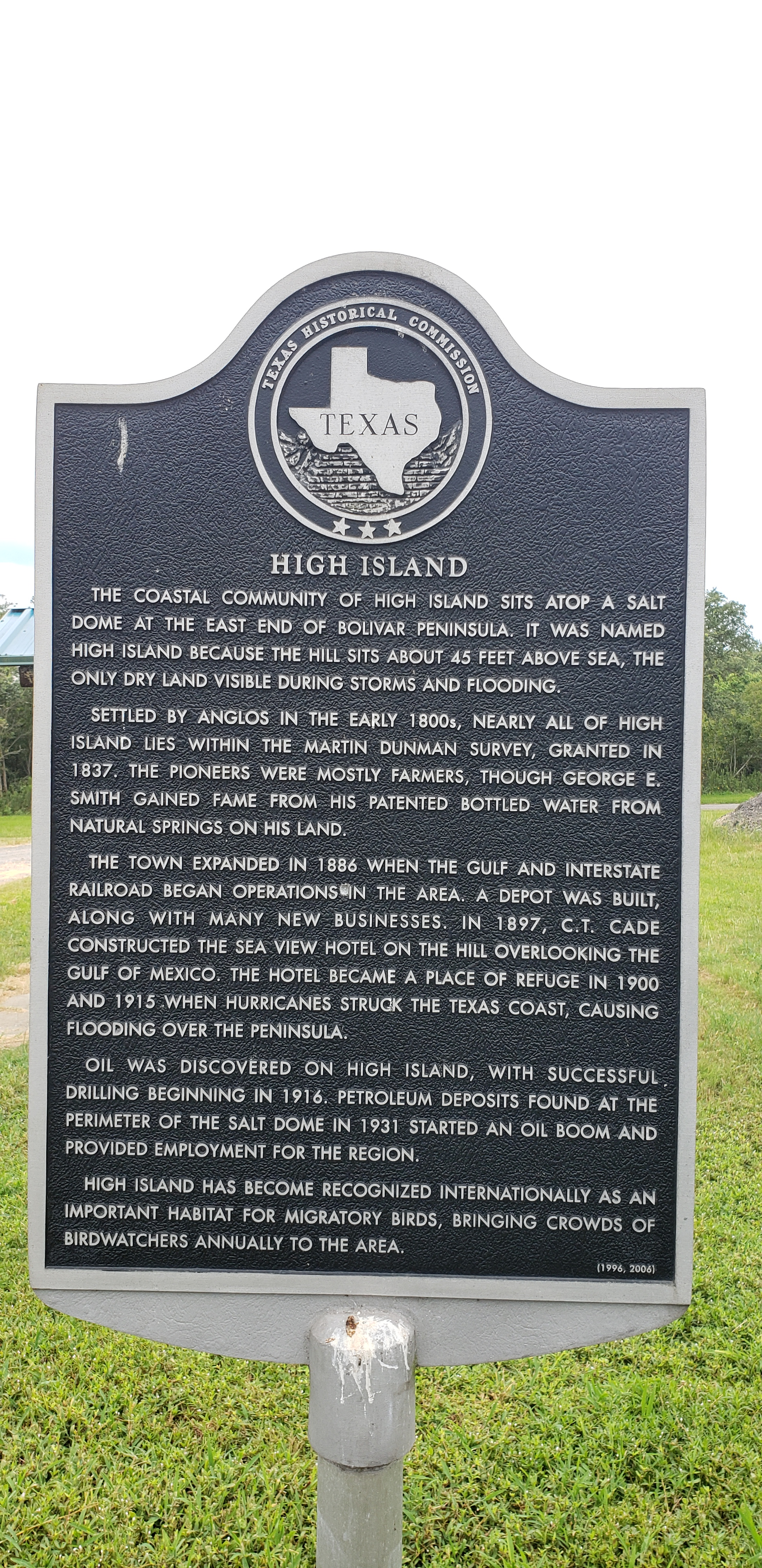
High Island oil field (left). Texas historical marker (right)

High Island is an unincorporated community located in the Bolivar Peninsula census-designated place, Galveston County, Texas, United States. The community is located in the extreme eastern part of the county on Bolivar Peninsula, less than one mile from Chambers County and less than two miles from Jefferson County. As of 2000, 500 people resided in High Island. The 2010 census did not record a population for High Island.

Houston Audubon operates four bird sanctuaries in the area, and the community is a globally famous destination for birdwatchers particularly during spring migration from April 1 to May 15. Sea Rim State Park is in nearby Jefferson County, but it is inaccessible by State Highway 87, which has been closed since 1990.

== History ==
High Island once had a large number of producing oil wells and was served by the Gulf, Colorado & Santa Fe Railway's branch line to Port Bolivar. Following the 1942 abandonment of trackage on the Bolivar Peninsula, High Island became the new terminus of the line until Santa Fe Railway removed its bobtail-truss swing bridge over Mud Bayou in 1969.

In the early 1970s, several victims of serial killer Dean Corll were buried by him and his accomplices at High Island's beach. Six bodies were recovered by law enforcement personnel in August 1973, while one remains undiscovered.

In 1986, Hurricane Bonnie made landfall near High Island. And in 2007, Hurricane Humberto made landfall near High Island as well. 2008 saw Hurricane Ike impact High Island with significant storm surge and winds up to 110 mph (178 km/h). After Hurricane Ike the United States Postal Service temporarily relocated High Island post office box services to Winnie, Texas.

== Geography ==
High Island lies on the eastern side of Galveston Bay, just inland from the Gulf of Mexico.

Located on the mainland, High Island's name comes from the large salt dome under the area. This salt dome raises the elevation of the area to around 38 feet, giving High Island the highest elevation of any point on the Gulf coast from Mobile, Alabama to the Yucatán Peninsula. The metaphorical "island" (the term island is used to describe other Gulf Coast salt domes, such as Avery Island in Louisiana) has often served to protect its residents from the effects of hurricanes' storm surge.

The main route from Houston to High Island is to travel along Interstate 45 to Galveston, take the ferry to Port Bolivar, and then travel east to High Island.

== Education ==
The High Island Independent School District serves the community.

High Island ISD is assigned to Galveston College in Galveston.

== Government and infrastructure ==
Unincorporated areas in Galveston County receive animal services from the Galveston County Animal Resource Center, an animal shelter operated by the Galveston County Health District in Texas City.

Unincorporated areas in Galveston County receive emergency medical services from the Galveston Area Ambulance Authority (GAAA), also operated by the health district.

== Birding tourism ==
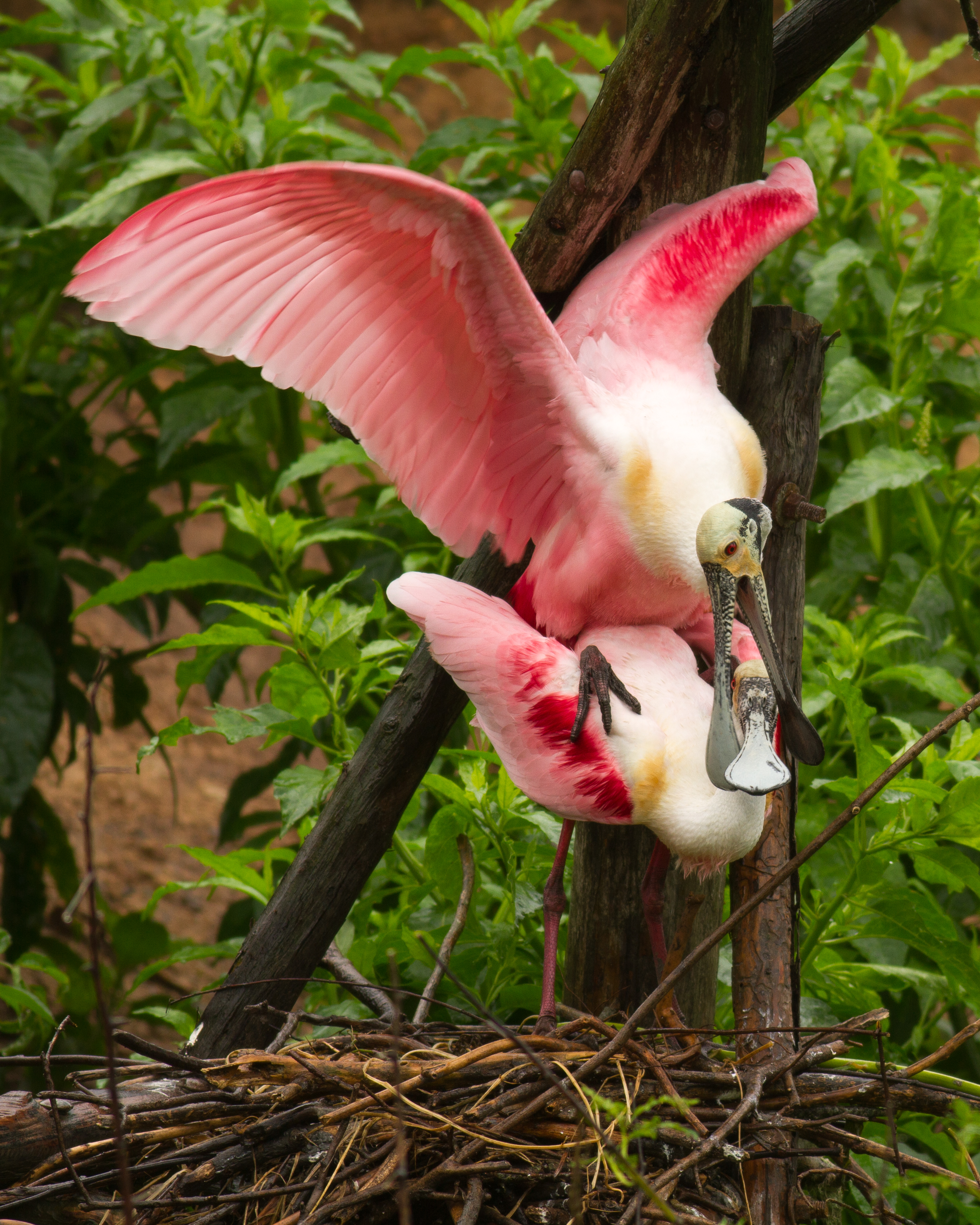
Mating Roseate spoonbills (Platalea ajaja) at Smith Oaks Sanctuary

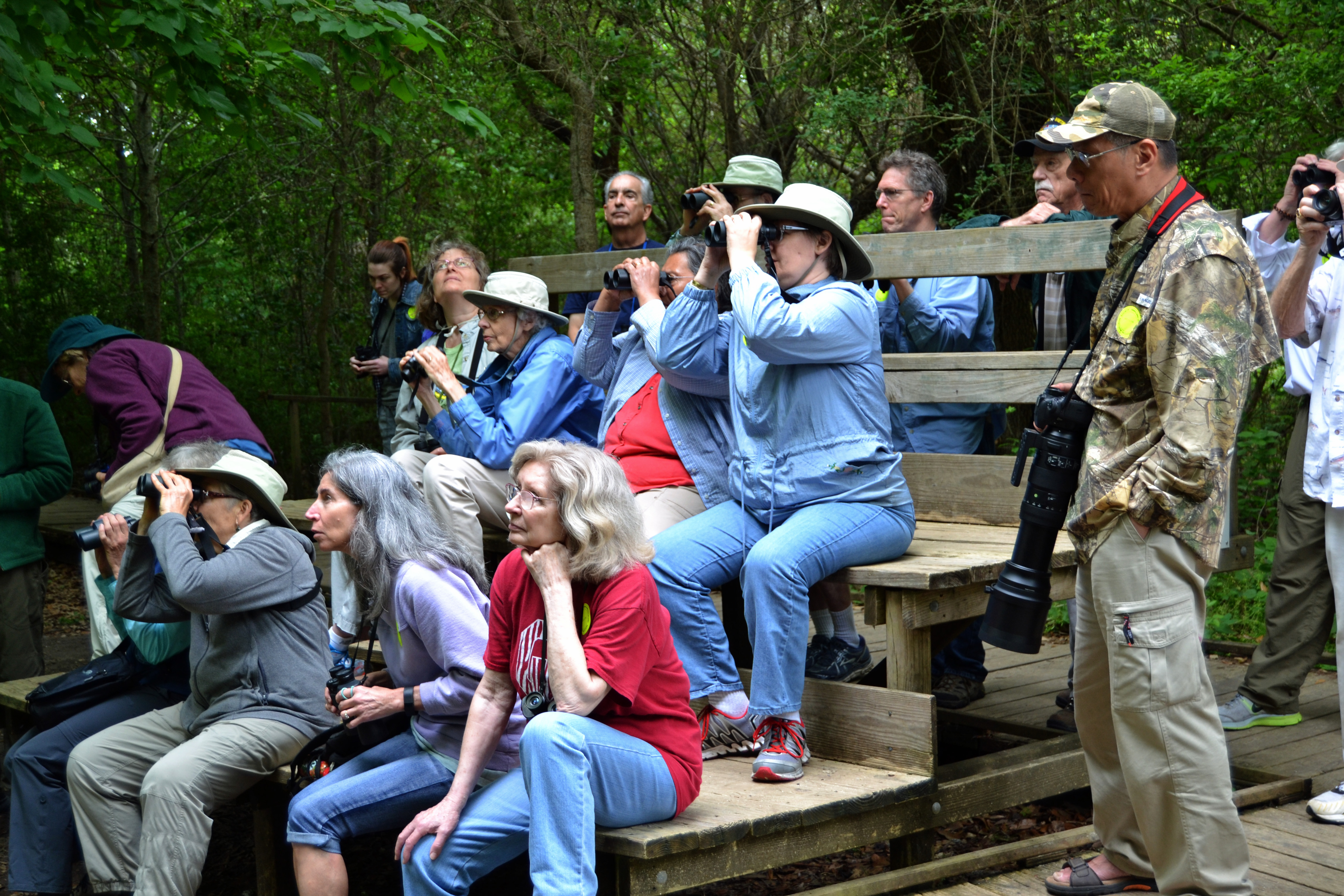
Eager Birders at the Drip at Boy Scout Woods in April 2016

Houston Audubon has 4 sanctuaries at High Island: Boy Scout Woods, Smith Oaks, Eubanks Woods, and the S.E. Gast Red Bay Sanctuary. Boy Scout Woods is the headquarters, which is staffed by volunteers during peak spring migration season from mid-March to mid-May. Smith Oaks is the largest sanctuary and home to the Rookery.

High Island, with its substantial wooded areas unlike elsewhere on the upper Texas coast, is a natural refuge for migrating birds making their perilous way across the Gulf of Mexico from the Yucatán Peninsula of Mexico into their northern summering grounds in the United States and Canada. During this spring migration, the birds must navigate the hundreds of miles of overwater flight to find refuge and food on their journey northward.

During a normal spring migration, birders from around the world can find concentrated and high numbers of species of migratory birds in High Island that winter in southern Mexico, Central America, and South America, and make their summer breeding homes in the north.

The most spectacular bird viewing is during a spring northerly storm, which causes a "fall out" at High Island. During these storms, the migrating birds encounter strong head winds and a prolonged and energy-draining flight over the Gulf. Every bird that comes off the Gulf near High Island is then exhausted, and immediately seeks a dry land perch. In such conditions, the beaches of the Bolivar Peninsula can be covered with tens of thousands of birds. With its wooded areas and more ample feeding opportunities, almost every tree and open space in High Island is covered with exhausted birds.

Fall southerly migration also concentrates along the Gulf at sites such as High Island, but is more dispersed as the southerly moving birds find ample cover and food as they move southward through the United States.
