= Gilchrist, Texas =

Town in Galveston County, Texas, United States

Coordinates: 29°30′45″N 94°29′21″W

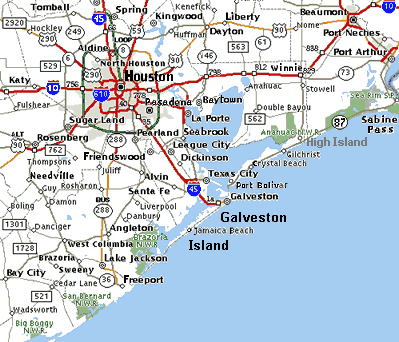
Gilchrist, Texas (center right) on Bolivar Peninsula, southeast of Houston.

Gilchrist, Texas is an unincorporated residential community and beachfront resort along State Highway 87, located seventeen miles east of Bolivar Point in the Bolivar Peninsula census-designated place, in Galveston County, Texas, United States.

In 1990 and 2000, Gilchrist's core population was approximately 750, but would see more residents due to seasonal visitors. When the settlement was decimated by Hurricane Ike on September 13, 2008, about 1,000 permanent residents had lived there, but were under evacuation orders. Several businesses in the community had operated to furnish necessities for permanent residents as well as tourists.

== History ==
Located in Galveston County, this community was named for Gibb Gilchrist (1887–1972) who relocated and rebuilt the rail line from High Island to Port Bolivar following the 1915 hurricane destruction. This settlement before this event was called Rollover.

In 1950, a post office was opened at Gilchrist.

A notable feature of the community was Rollover Pass (or Rollover Fish Pass), which divided Bolivar Peninsula as well as Gilchrist and carried water between East Bay and the Gulf of Mexico. It was regarded among sportsmen as a very popular fishing location in Texas with some the largest fish in the state. Rollover Pass was a natural high-tide pass that had been dredged wider in 1955 by the Texas Game and Fish Commission as part of its efforts to preserve and improve fish and wildlife resources. In late 2019 contractors hired by the Texas General Land Office installed steel barriers and, months later, dumped dirt into the Pass to close off water flow.

Hurricane Carla caused damage to Gilchrist. On April 23, 1991, the community, and other areas of Galveston County, received an enhanced 9-1-1 system which routes calls to proper dispatchers and allows dispatchers to automatically view the address of the caller.

== Hurricane Ike ==
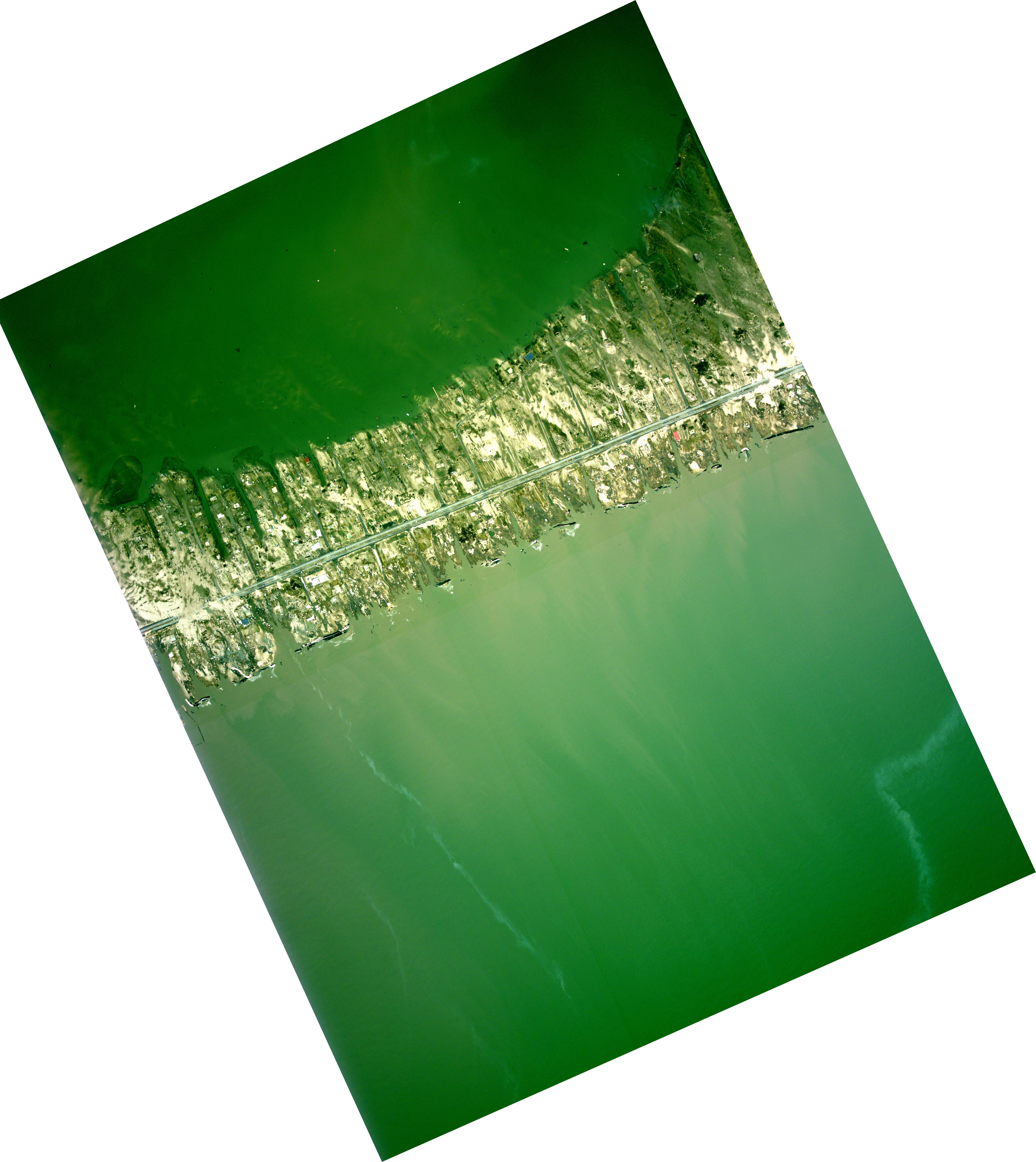
Aerial photograph of Gilchrist after Hurricane Ike.

On September 13, 2008, Gilchrist was devastated by Hurricane Ike, which completely destroyed all but a few homes. About 1,000 permanent residents had lived there. The coastline along Gilchrist, once a straight line, became jagged and desolate, permanently altered by Ike's turbulent storm tide.

NOAA aerial photography reveals complete destruction of Gilchrist. The Rollover Pass bridge on Highway 87 was reduced to one lane. Of the 1,000 buildings in Gilchrist, 99.5% of them were knocked off of their foundations. The storm demolished most and washed others into East Bay and swamplands behind Gilchrist. Of all of the houses in one section of Gilchrist, one remained standing. Several houses in another section were still there. Pam Adams, homeowner of the "Last House Standing," stated that many of Gilchrist's homes were built before the latest building codes were enacted. John Lee, Galveston County's emergency management spokesperson, said that Gilchrist had been "wiped clean" by the hurricane.

After Hurricane Ike the United States Postal Service temporarily relocated Gilchrist post office box services to Stowell. Regarding the prospect of returning, John Lee said "It's a very sobering experience that some don't want to go through again. How many will be back? We don't know."

By January 2009, of the communities in the Bolivar Peninsula, Gilchrist received the fewest returnees.

By 2011, Galveston County bought out 434 houses in Gilchrist since the houses were too close to the shore, post-Ike. The land will have limited uses.

As of 2014, homes and businesses have been rebuilt in the area, new residents are settling in, and visitors once again are able to travel through that section of Highway 87. The Rollover Pass bridge has two lanes open instead of the original three. But Texas Historical Marker Number 7166 has yet to be replaced at the Pass.

== Government and infrastructure ==
The Gilchrist Volunteer Fire Department originally served Gilchrist prior to Hurricane Ike. After the Hurricane struck, the Gilchrist Volunteer Fire Department disbanded, and donated all their equipment to other departments many miles away. This upset many residents of the Gilchrist Community and others on the Bolivar Peninsula. Gilchrist is now served by members of the High Island Volunteer Fire Rescue Department

The United States Postal Service once operated the Gilchrist Post Office, which opened on September 16, 1950. The building was destroyed by Hurricane Ike and the post office, in name, was officially discontinued on July 31, 2010.

Unincorporated areas in Galveston County receive animal services from the Galveston County Animal Resource Center, an animal shelter operated by the Galveston County Health District in Texas City.

Unincorporated areas in Galveston County receive emergency medical services from the Galveston Area Ambulance Authority (GAAA), also operated by the health district.

== Education ==
Gilchrist residents are zoned to schools in the High Island Independent School District.

High Island ISD is assigned to Galveston College in Galveston.

== GCA (Gilchrist Community Association) ==
The purpose of the GCA is to provide civic duties at Rollover Pass on the Bolivar Peninsula in the state of Texas and other civic and community projects to improve and enhance the quality of life for the residents and visitors of Bolivar Peninsula.

The GCA is a 501(c)4 organization whose members are from all over the United States. Their common goal is to save their community from being destroyed by outside interests and keep Rollover Pass open for everyone to enjoy.

== Bibliography ==
- "Handbook of Texas Online". Texas State Historical Association. February 21, 2002.
