= Point Bolivar Light =

Point Bolivar Lighthouse
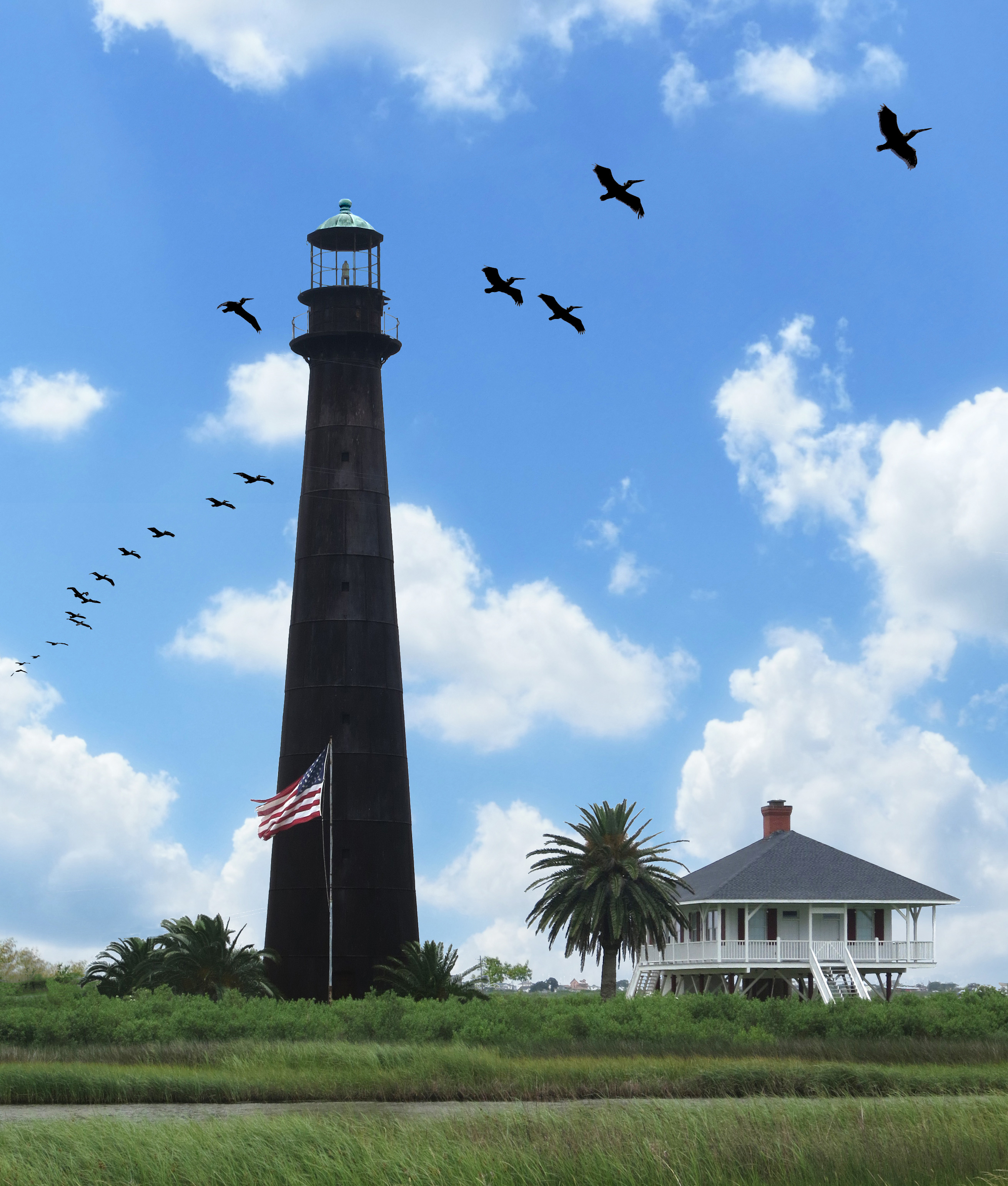
- Port Bolivar Lighthouse in 2010
- Location: SH 87, Port Bolivar, Texas
- Coordinates: 29.366787°N 94.766972°W

Tower
- Construction: brick covered with cast iron sheets
- Height: 116 feet (35 m)
- Shape: round
- Heritage: National Register of Historic Places listed place

Light
- First lit: 1852
- Deactivated: 1933
- Lens: Fresnel lens
- Point Bolivar Lighthouse
- U.S. National Register of Historic Places
- Area: 0.3 acres (0.12 ha)
- Built: 1872
- Built by: Bureau of Lighthouses
- Architectural style: Malleable-Iron Lighthouse
- NRHP reference No.: 77001445
- Added to NRHP: August 18, 1977

Point Bolivar Light is a historic lighthouse in Port Bolivar, Texas, that was built in 1872. It served for 61 years before being retired in 1933, when its function was replaced by a different light.

The current lighthouse is at least the second structure at the site. The first lighthouse was built in 1852 of cast iron made at the Baltimore foundry of Murray and Hazlehurst, and was pulled down during the Civil War so that Union warships could not use it as a navigational aid.

== History ==
1862 map of Galveston showing the position of the lighthouse

During the Galveston Hurricane of 1900, the lighthouse served as a shelter for at least 125 people, saving their lives. In 1915, the lighthouse also survived another hurricane, where winds of 126 miles per hour were recorded. The first lighthouse keeper, H. C. Claiborne, retired in 1918, after witnessing those two storms, and was replaced by a Captain J. Brooks. From the 1890s until the line's abandonment in 1942, the lighthouse looked down on the Gulf, Colorado & Santa Fe Railway line that ran between it and Texas State Highway 87.

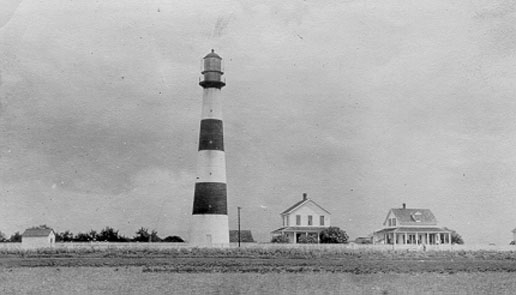
Port Bolivar Lighthouse

The War Department took possession of the lighthouse in 1935. It was transferred to the War Assets Administration. In 1947, the lighthouse was sold to rancher Elmer V. Boyt, and remains in the family. The 1970 film My Sweet Charlie, starring Patty Duke and Al Freeman Jr. was filmed at the lighthouse and adjacent caretaker's house. Although still standing, is not open to the public.

== Current ==
After withstanding over 150 years of erosion, the lighthouse has rusted to a dark brown color.

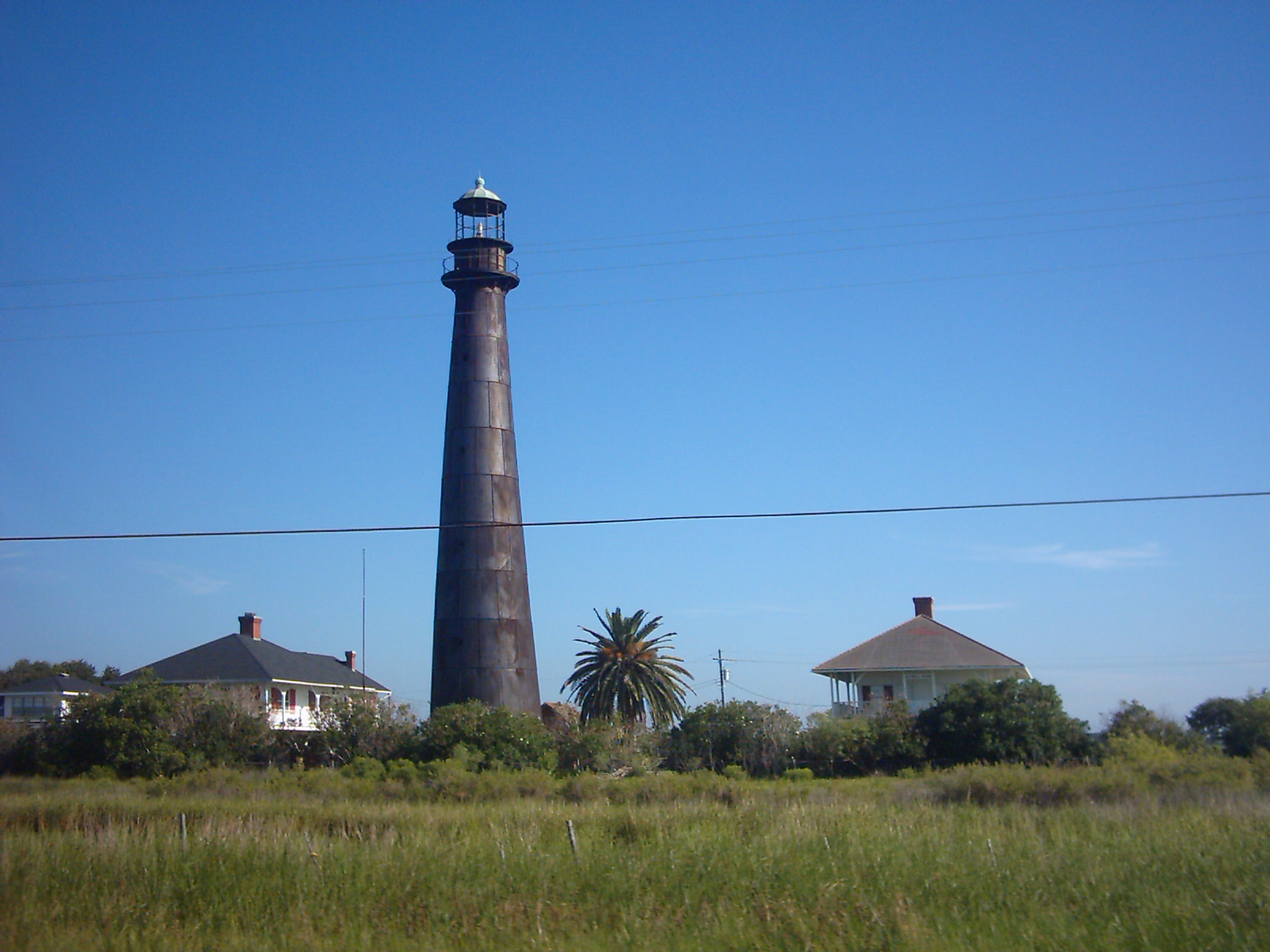
Point Bolivar Lighthouse

The lighthouse is adjacent to the Houston Audubon Society's Horseshoe Marsh Bird Sanctuary.

== See also ==
- National Register of Historic Places listings in Galveston County, Texas
