= Galveston College =

Community college in Galveston, Texas, US

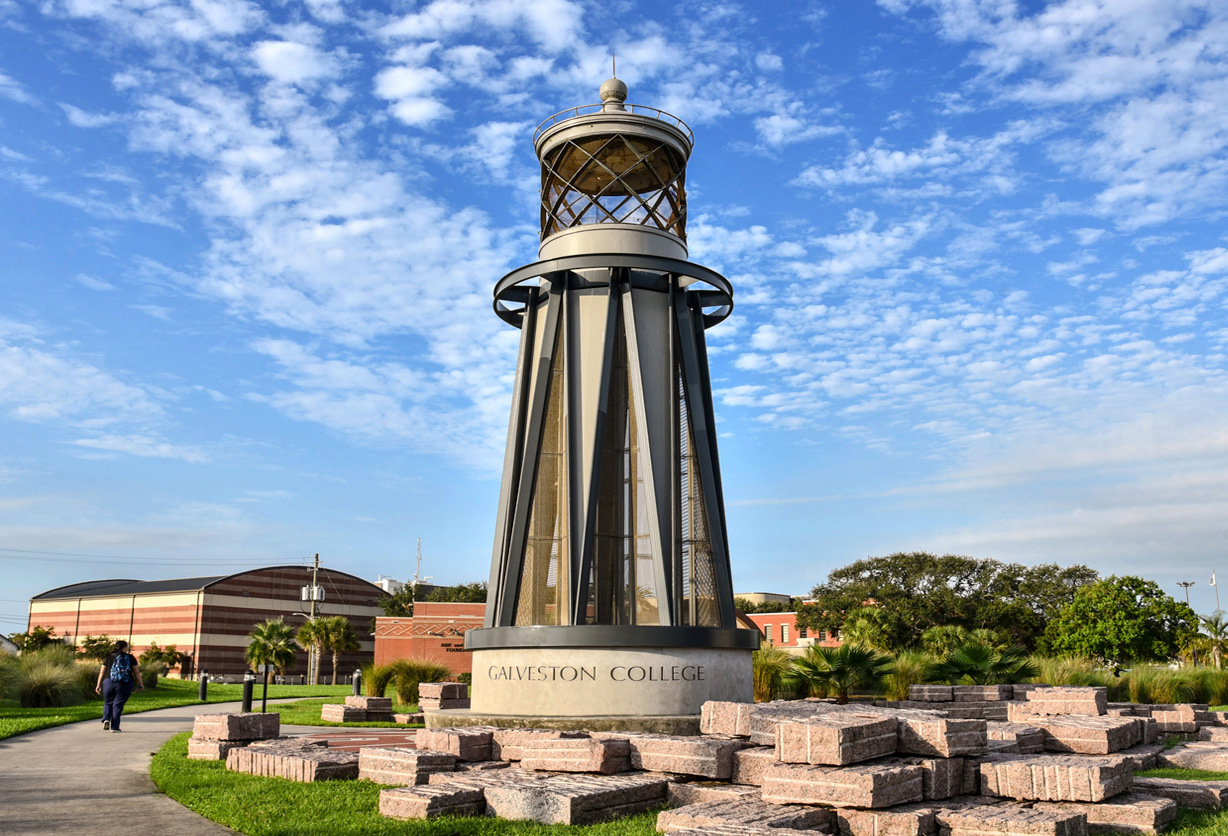
- Motto: A Beacon of Light Guiding Lifelong Learning
- Type: Public community college
- Established: 1967
- President: W. Myles Shelton
- Faculty: 150
- Undergraduates: 2,400
- Location: Galveston, Texas, U.S. 29°17′05″N 94°48′31″W
- Campus: Urban
- Colors: Royal blue & orange
- Nickname: Whitecaps
- Website: www.gc.edu
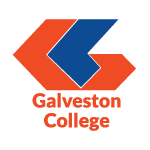

Galveston College (GC) is a public community college in Galveston, Texas.

== History ==
On November 2, 1935, voters approved the creation of the Galveston Junior College District. However, a subsequent 1936 election to support the new district via a property tax failed, as did several other attempts.

In the mid-1960s, the creation of a college district on the Galveston County mainland – which ultimately led to the opening of College of the Mainland – motivated Galveston citizens to revive attempts at constructing a campus on the Island. After obtaining an opinion from the Texas Attorney General that the district—though never funded—was legally still intact, in 1966 the citizens finally passed a vote for a tax rate to support the new institution. In September 1967—almost 32 years after the district was created—Galveston College opened its doors to students.

== Campus ==
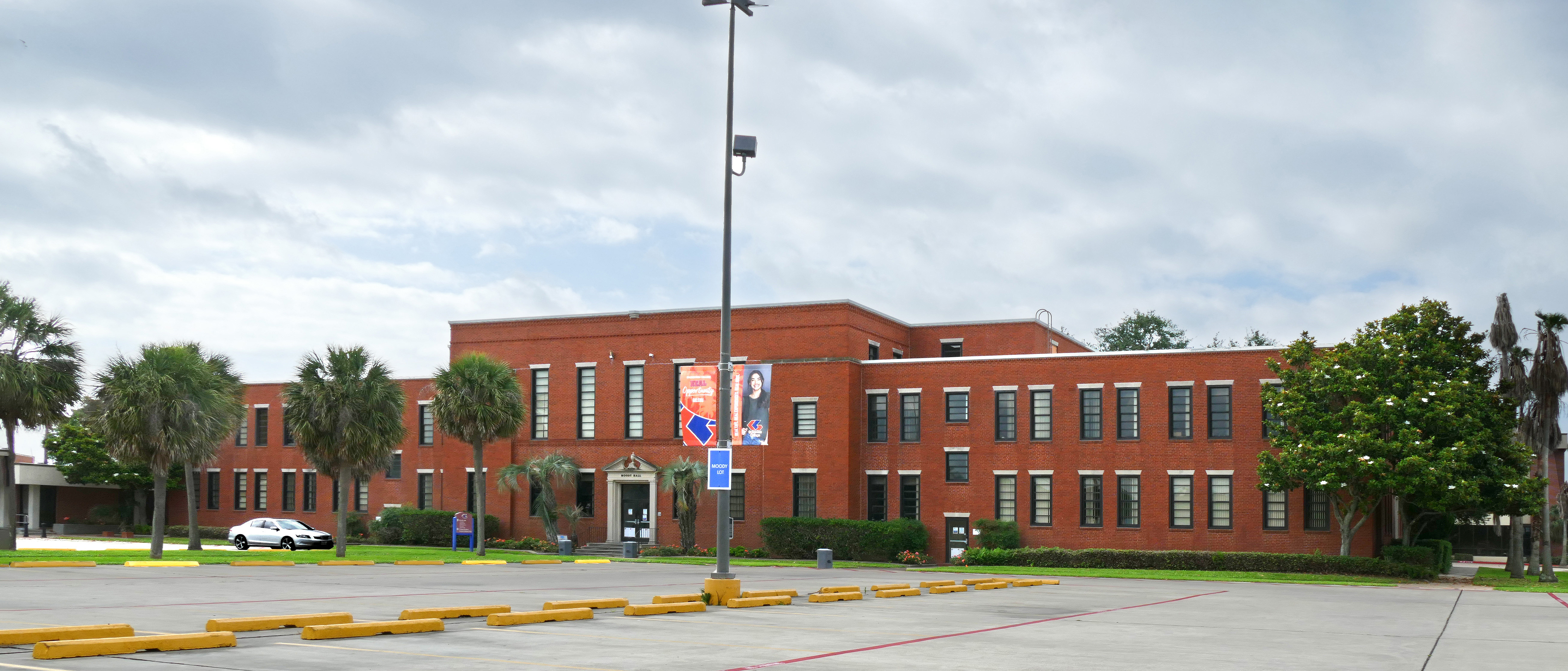
Moody Hall

Galveston College originally operated in a building that had formerly been occupied by an orphanage—a building that is still part of the school and houses several auditoriums in addition to the college's administrative offices. Over the past 47 years the school has expanded several times through bond issues and grants by local families and foundations. At one point in the 1980s the college was composed of two campuses, the Main campus at 41st and Avenue Q and the Fort Crockett campus near 53rd Street and Avenue U. During the 1990s land around the main campus was purchased and additional classrooms and facilities were constructed. This allowed for the consolidation of the Fort Crockett campus into the main campus. A second campus was again established in 2013 when the Charlie Thomas Family Applied Technology Center was opened to house welding, electronics, HVAC, cosmetology, medical coding, and certified nursing assistant programs.

Galveston College has dormitories for students.

== Organization and administration ==
Galveston College is led by a president who answers to the Galveston Community College District Board of Regents whose nine members are publicly elected. The president is currently W. Myles Shelton.

In the late 1990s interest was shown in creating an endowment that would encourage high school graduates in the community to attend college. This led to the creation of the Galveston College Universal Access Community Endowment Scholarship. Students who graduate from one of the Island's three high schools (Ball High School, O'Connell College Preparatory School) and Odyssey Academy and fulfill certain requirements are eligible to have their tuition and fees paid for by the Galveston College Foundation.

As defined by the Texas Legislature, the official service area of Galveston College is the following:

- the Galveston Independent School District (serving Galveston and Jamaica Beach and portions of the Bolivar Peninsula),
- the Bolivar Peninsula (including portions in Galveston and Chambers Counties), including the unincorporated High Island community and the High Island Independent School District, and
- the Hamshire Fannett and Sabine Pass school districts located within Jefferson County. Therefore, Galveston College serves several unincorporated communities and the Sabine Pass community of southern Port Arthur.

== Academics ==
The college serves an ethnically diverse population of approximately 2,400 students each semester in credit programs and nearly 8,000 individuals annually in continuing education and workforce development programs. It has a full-time staff and faculty of over 150 employees and nearly 90 adjunct faculty members. It has also partnered with the Galveston-based University of Texas Medical Branch in creating specialized certificate programs and education tracks.

The college offers a broad range of Associate degree programs in the following fields:

- Arts and Humanities
- Health Science
- Nursing
- Science, technology, engineering, and mathematics
- Computer Science and Information Technology
- Public service, business, and industry.

=== Four-year programs ===
Galveston College offers two four-year degrees.

As of January 2023, the Accreditation Commission for Education in Nursing granted accreditation to Galveston College for a Bachelor's degree program in Nursing.

The college also offers a Bachelor of Applied Science in Healthcare Management.

== Student life ==
=== Sport ===
College athletic teams are nicknamed the Whitecaps. The college fields teams in baseball and softball.

== Notable people ==
- Brandon Backe, professional baseball player
- Keith Foulke, professional baseball player
- Juan Pierre, professional baseball player
- Gerardo Reyes, professional baseball player
