= Tor Baseball Field =

Baseball field in Galveston, Texas

- Interactive map of Tor Baseball Field
- Address: 3402 83rd St; Galveston, Texas; United States
- Coordinates: 29.258340°N 94.848245°W

Tor Baseball Field (also known as Tors-Whitecaps Field, Whitecaps-Tors Field, Whitecaps Field, and GISD/Whitecaps Field) is a baseball venue located at 83rd Street and Stewart Road on Galveston Island in Galveston, Texas. It serves as the home field for the Galveston Ball High School Tornadoes baseball team.

== History ==
The field was constructed to host high school and college baseball games and became the home of the Galveston College Whitecaps baseball team from 1992 until 2009. In 2009, the Galveston Independent School District assumed full control of the facility, prompting Galveston College to relocate its baseball program to a new venue.

In September 2008, the field sustained significant damage from Hurricane Ike, which impacted much of Galveston Island and required extensive repairs before games could resume.

== Renaming ==
In March 2023, Galveston ISD renamed the facility Roger "Bo" Quiroga Stadium in honor of Roger Quiroga, a former Ball High School standout athlete and three-term mayor of Galveston. Quiroga led the Tornadoes to a deep playoff run in 1971 and was later drafted in the first round by the Washington Senators before returning to Galveston to serve the community, including three terms as mayor.

== Features and Location ==
Tor Baseball Field is situated near other athletic facilities, including the Tor Softball Field and Kermit Courville Stadium. Its location on Galveston Island places it within proximity to major attractions such as Moody Gardens and the Galveston Island Historic Pleasure Pier.

== See also ==
- Ball High School
- Galveston College
- Hurricane Ike
- High school baseball in the United States
