= Education in Galveston, Texas =

As one of the oldest and more historically significant cities in Texas, Galveston has had a long history of advancements and offerings in education, including: the first parochial school (Ursuline Academy) (1847), the first medical college (now the University of Texas Medical Branch) (1891), and the first school for nurses (1890).

== Healthcare and research ==
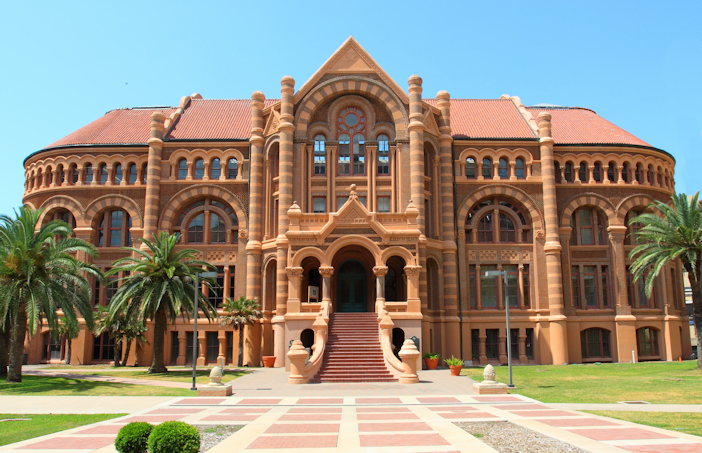
"Old Red", the original UTMB Galveston building.

Established in 1891 with one building and fewer than 50 students, today the University of Texas Medical Branch (UTMB) campus has grown to more than 70 buildings and an enrollment of more than 2,500 students. The 84-acre (340,000 m^{2}) campus includes schools of medicine, nursing, allied health professions, and a graduate school of biomedical sciences, as well as three institutes for advanced studies & medical humanities, a major medical library, seven hospitals, a network of clinics that provide a full range of primary and specialized medical care, and numerous research facilities.

In addition, the UTMB campus includes an affiliated Shriners Burns Institute. In 2003 UTMB received funding from the National Institutes of Health to construct a $150 million National Biocontainment Laboratory on its campus, one of only two in the United States and the only one on a university campus. It houses several Biosafety Level 4 research laboratories, where studies on highly infectious materials can be carried out safely.

== Higher education ==
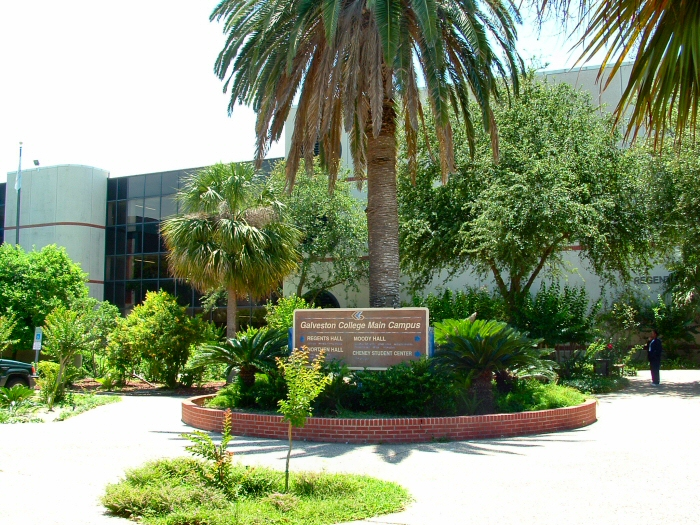
Galveston College

Galveston is home to two post-secondary institutions offering traditional degrees in higher education. Galveston College, a junior college that opened in 1967, serves an ethnically diverse population of approximately 2,400 students each semester in credit programs and nearly 5,000 individuals annually in continuing education programs.

Texas A&M University at Galveston is an ocean-oriented branch campus of Texas A&M University offering undergraduate degrees in marine biology, marine fisheries, marine engineering technology, marine sciences, marine transportation, maritime administration, maritime studies, maritime systems engineering, oceans and coastal resources, and university studies such as marine environmental law and policy. In addition, the graduate programs include: a masters of marine resources management and a masters or Ph.D. (thesis and non-thesis) in marine biology.

== Primary and secondary education ==
=== Public schools ===
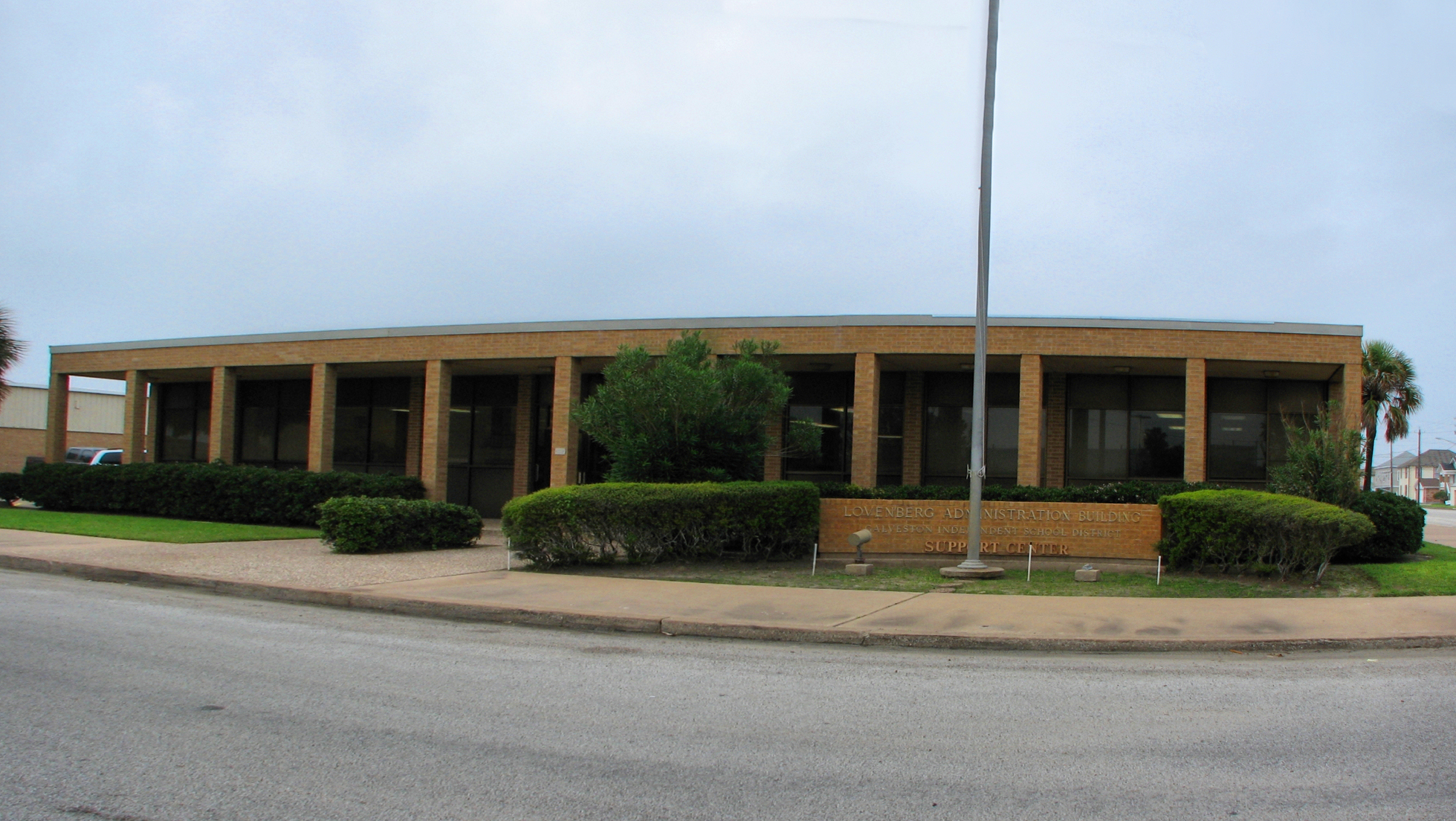
Galveston Independent School District Administration Building

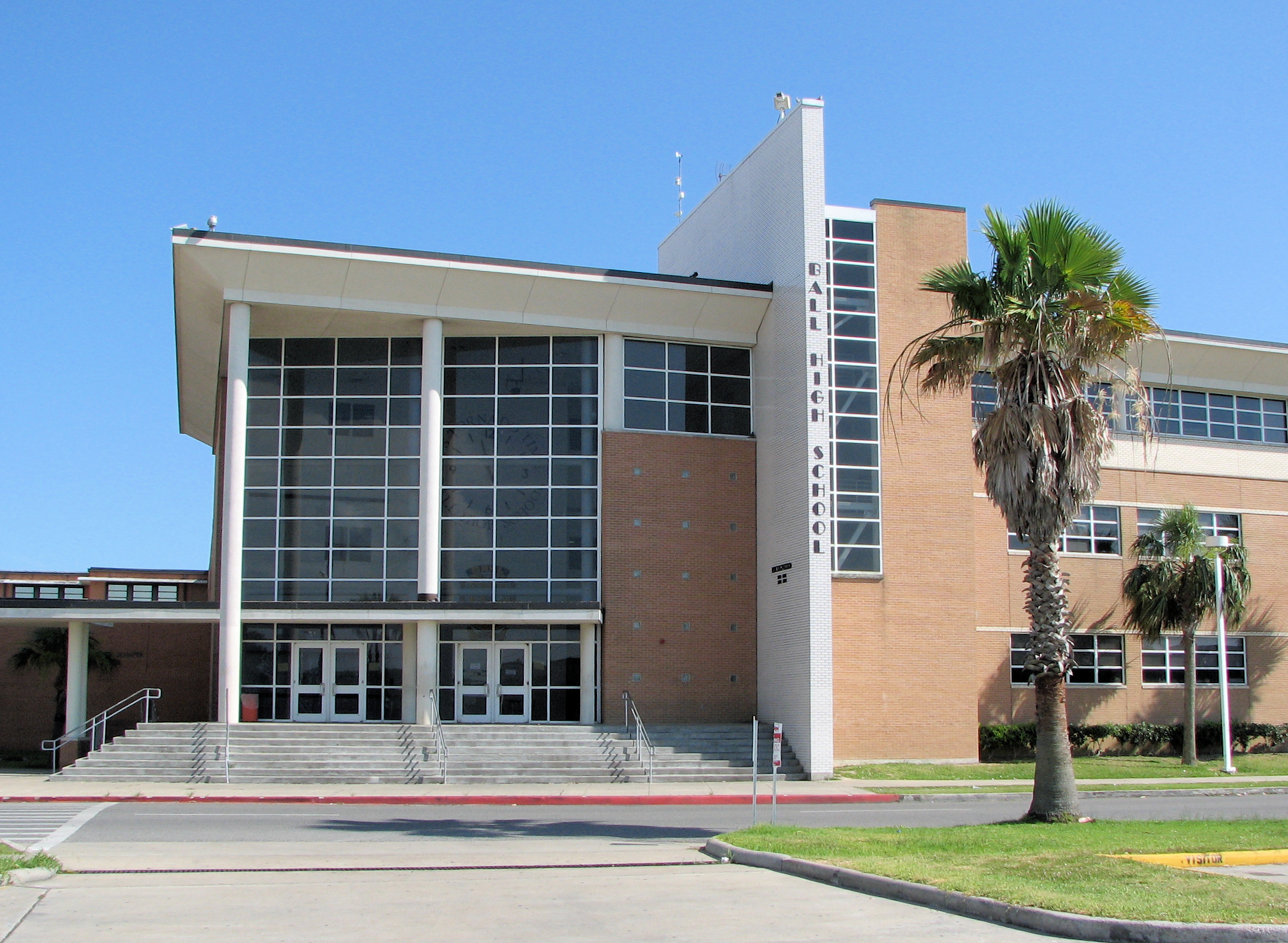
Ball High School

The city of Galveston is served by Galveston Independent School District. Several district public elementary schools, including L. A. Morgan, Greta Oppe, Gladneio Parker, and Early Childhood University, serve grades pre-Kindergarten through 4. Several middle schools and high school programs exist within the district: Weis Middle School for grades 5 through 6, Central Middle School for grades 7 through 8, and Ball High School for grades 9 through 12. Austin Magnet Middle School has grades 5 through 8 and centers around science, technology, engineering and math but is most commonly referred to as a STEM school.

GISD provided several firsts in the state of Texas: the first public elementary school (Rosenberg Elementary School), the first public High School (George Ball High School - moved to a different location, and consolidated) and the first public African American High School (Central School, now Central Middle School).

Prior to 1968, Galveston operated Ball High School for White students and Central High School for Black students. Central School, the first Texas public school for African-Americans, opened in 1885 and became a high school in 1886. In 1968 the two high schools consolidated and the Central campus became a junior high school. Travis Elementary School, which opened in 1948, closed in the 1970s. Crockett Elementary School closed by 1978. The tax base of the Galveston ISD grew by 13% in 2005 while Galveston ISD lost many district-zoned non-Hurricane Katrina evacuee students. San Jacinto Elementary School closed in 2006. Alamo Elementary School, which opened in 1935 and received renovations in 1980 and 1986, closed in 2007. Prior to fall 2008, Galveston ISD had a different school configuration: Elementary schools served pre-Kindergarten through grade 5 and Austin, Weis, and Central middle schools served grades 6 through 8.

=== Charter schools ===
Galveston has several state-funded charter schools not affiliated with local school districts, including Kindergarten through 5th Grade Ambassadors Preparatory Academy and Pre-Kindergarten through 8th Grade Odyssey Academy. In addition KIPP: the Knowledge Is Power Program opened KIPP Coastal Village as a part of GISD in 2009 but left in 2014 due to GISD budget cuts.

=== Private and parochial schools ===
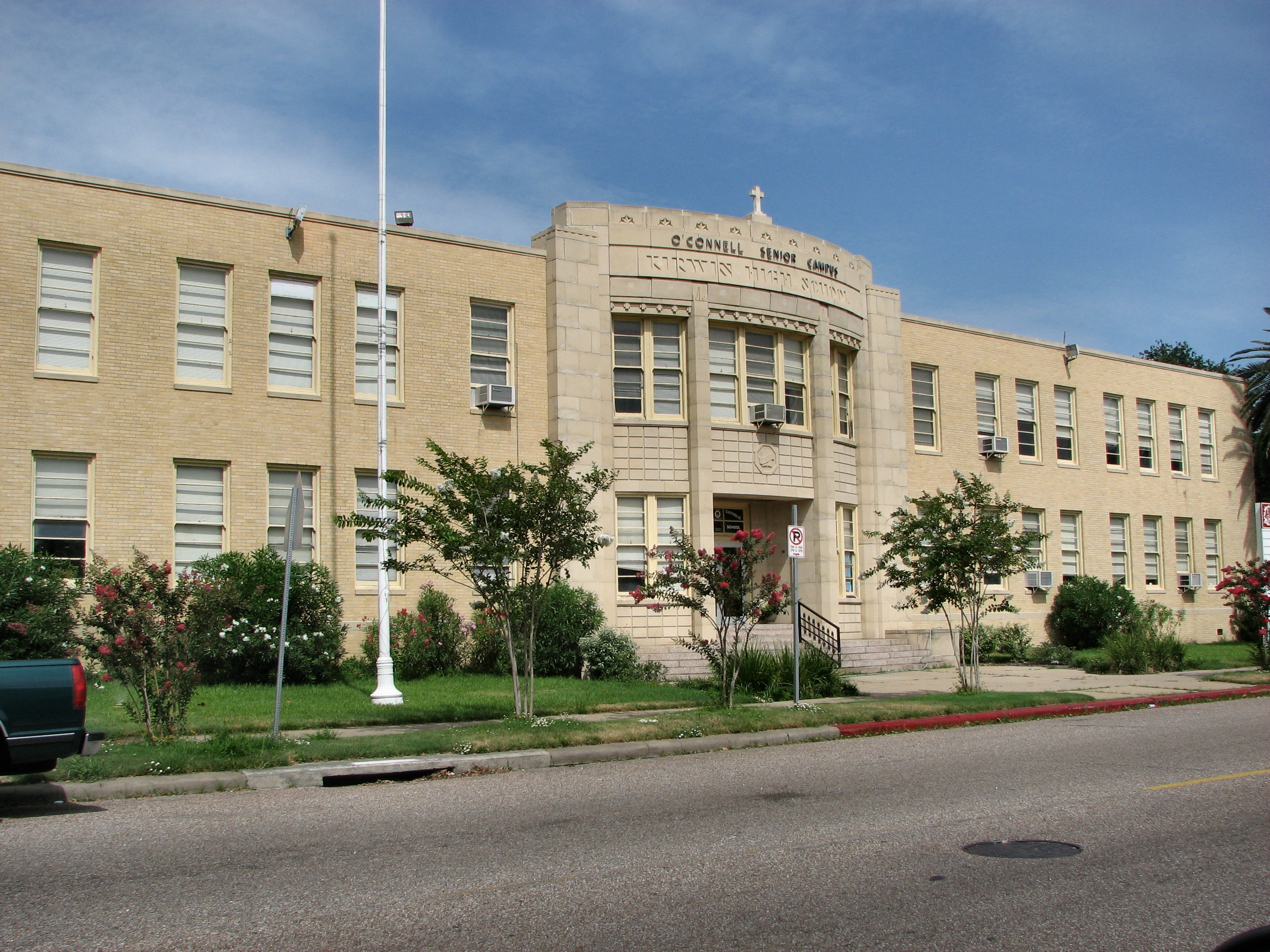
O'Connell College Preparatory School

Several private schools exist in Galveston. The Roman Catholic Archdiocese of Galveston-Houston operates two Roman Catholic private schools, including Holy Family Catholic School (K through 8th) and O'Connell College Preparatory School (9-12). O'Connell Consolidated High School opened in 1968 as a consolidation of Kirwin, Dominican and Ursuline, three Galveston Catholic high schools. Galveston Catholic School opened in 1986 as a consolidation of Dominican School, Our Lady of Guadalupe School, Saint Patrick's School, and O’Connell Junior High School. In 2010, with the closure of all seven of the Galveston Island & Bolivar parishes, and establishment of one new area-wide parish, Galveston Catholic was renamed Holy Family Catholic School Saint Patrick's opened in 1881 and received its final campus in 1926. Some parents protested plans to consolidate the schools before the consolidation became final. O'Connell was renamed to O'Connell College Preparatory School in 2007. Satori Elementary School, a non-religious Kindergarten through Grade 6 school, is on the island. Trinity Episcopal School, in partnership with Trinity Episcopal Church (an Episcopal Church), is on the island and serves students from PreK to 8th grades. Two Kindergarten through 12th grade schools, Seaside Christian Academy (affiliated with Seaside Baptist Church in Jamaica Beach) and Heritage Christian Academy, are in Galveston.

=== Public libraries ===
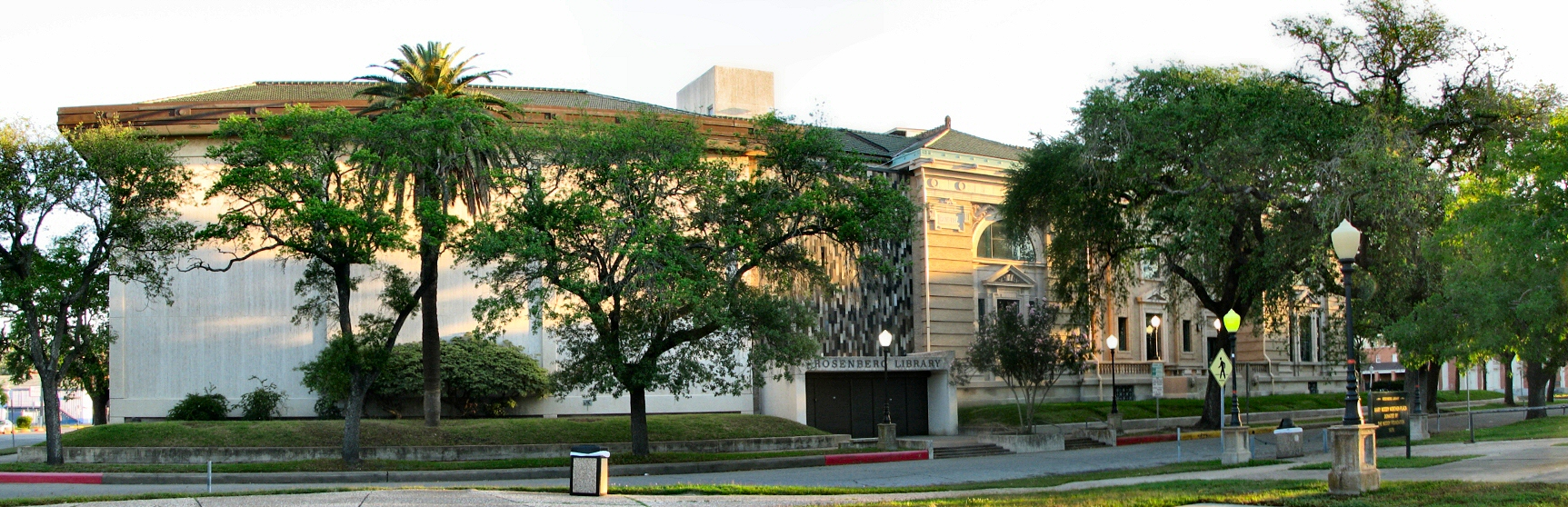
Rosenberg Library

The city is served by the Rosenberg Library. The library serves as headquarters of the Galveston County Library System, which opened in 1941. The Rosenberg Library's librarian also functions as the Galveston County Librarian.

== See also ==
- Education in Texas
- Education in the United States
- List of colleges and universities in Houston
- List of colleges and universities in Texas
