= Paul R. Schumann =

American painter

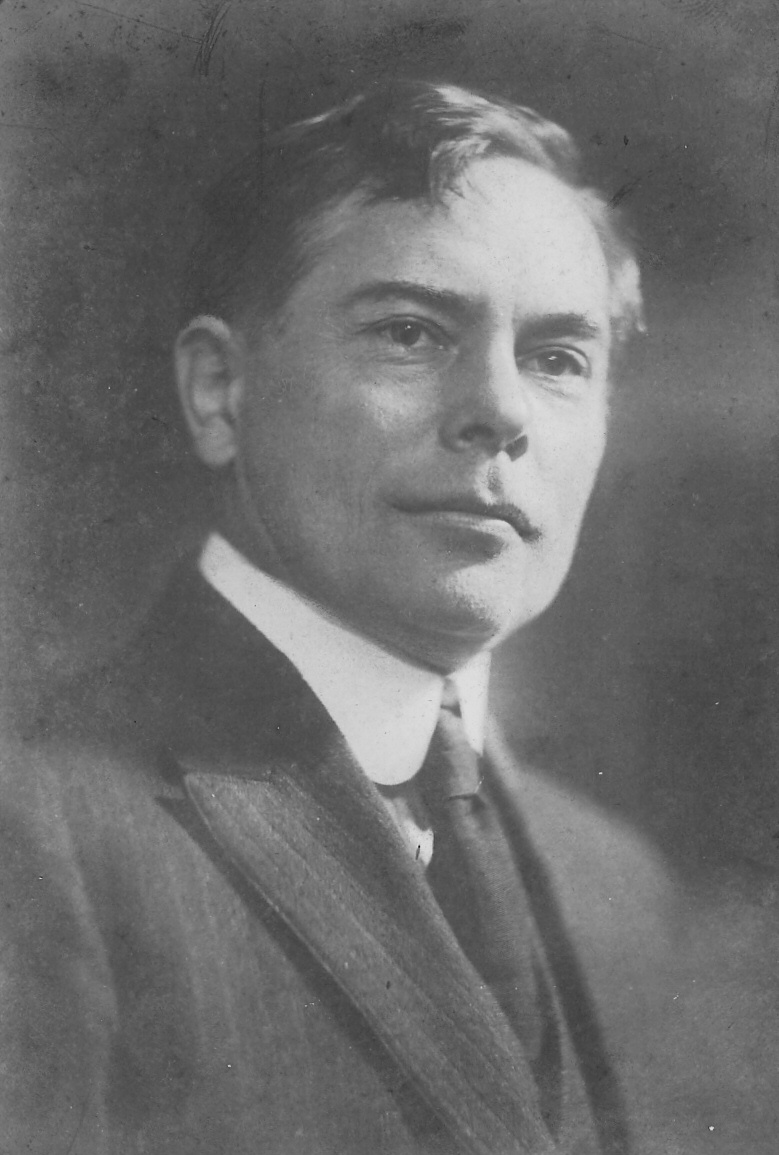
Paul R. Schumann

Paul Richard Schumann (December 13, 1876 – April 29, 1946) was a Texas impressionist seascape painter who has been called the Gulf Coast counterpart of Winslow Homer.

== Education and personal life ==
Paul R. Schumann was born in Reichersdorf in the German state of Saxony in 1876, one of four children of Albert F. Schumann and Mina Clara Zincke. Only he and his brother Albert Otto survived infancy. The family emigrated to the United States in 1879 and settled in Galveston, Texas, where he lived until his death.

Schumann evinced an early interest in art and received encouragement from the superintendent of the Galveston Public Schools. He studied painting with local painter Julius Stockfleth before turning to plein air painting.

Schumann married Carolina Adela Bergmann from Fredericksburg, Texas, in 1903 and later credited her as his inspiration. They had three children: Paul August, Clara Adela, and Robert Edward. Carolina died in 1937.

== Painting career ==
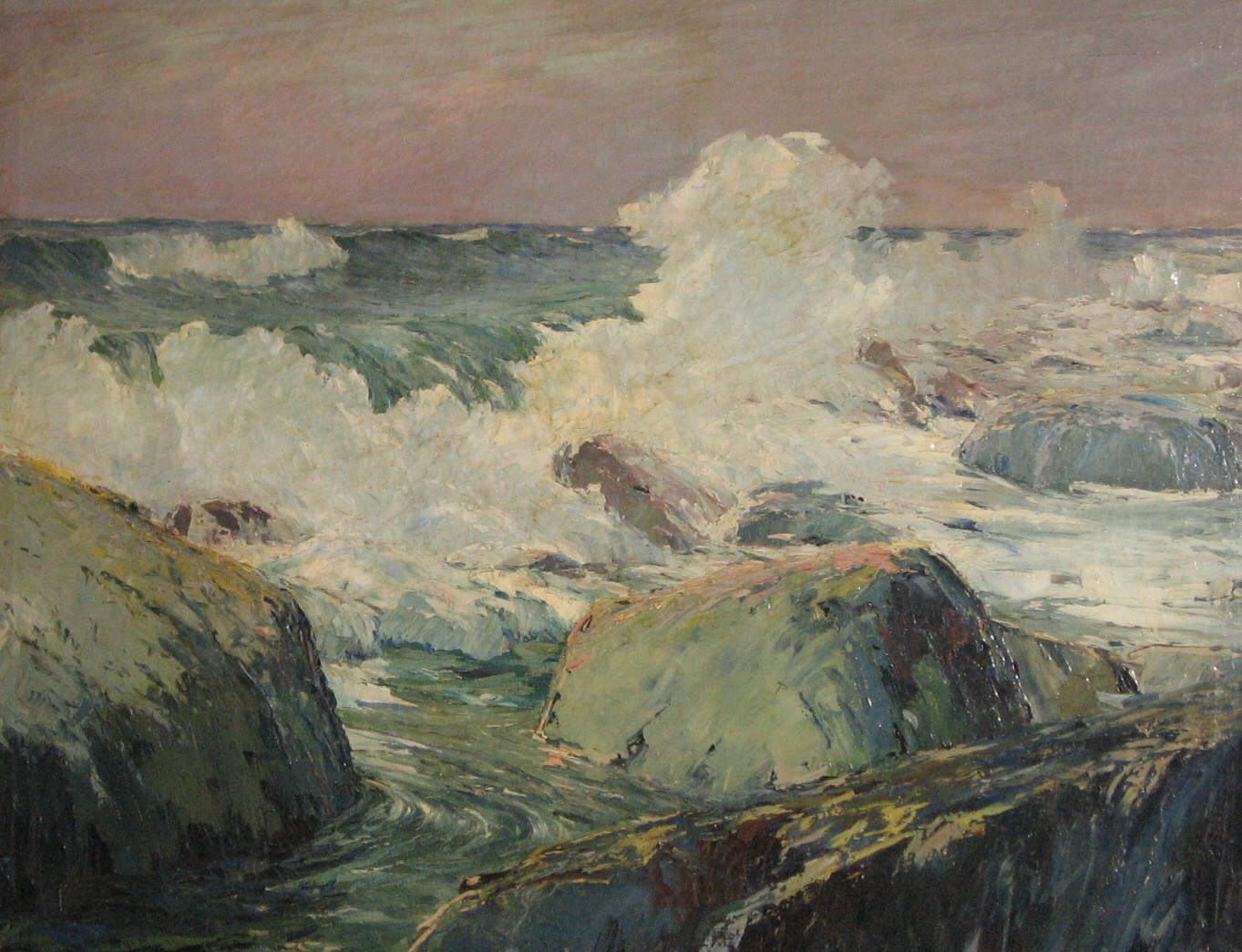
Gulf Surf at Galveston, Texas

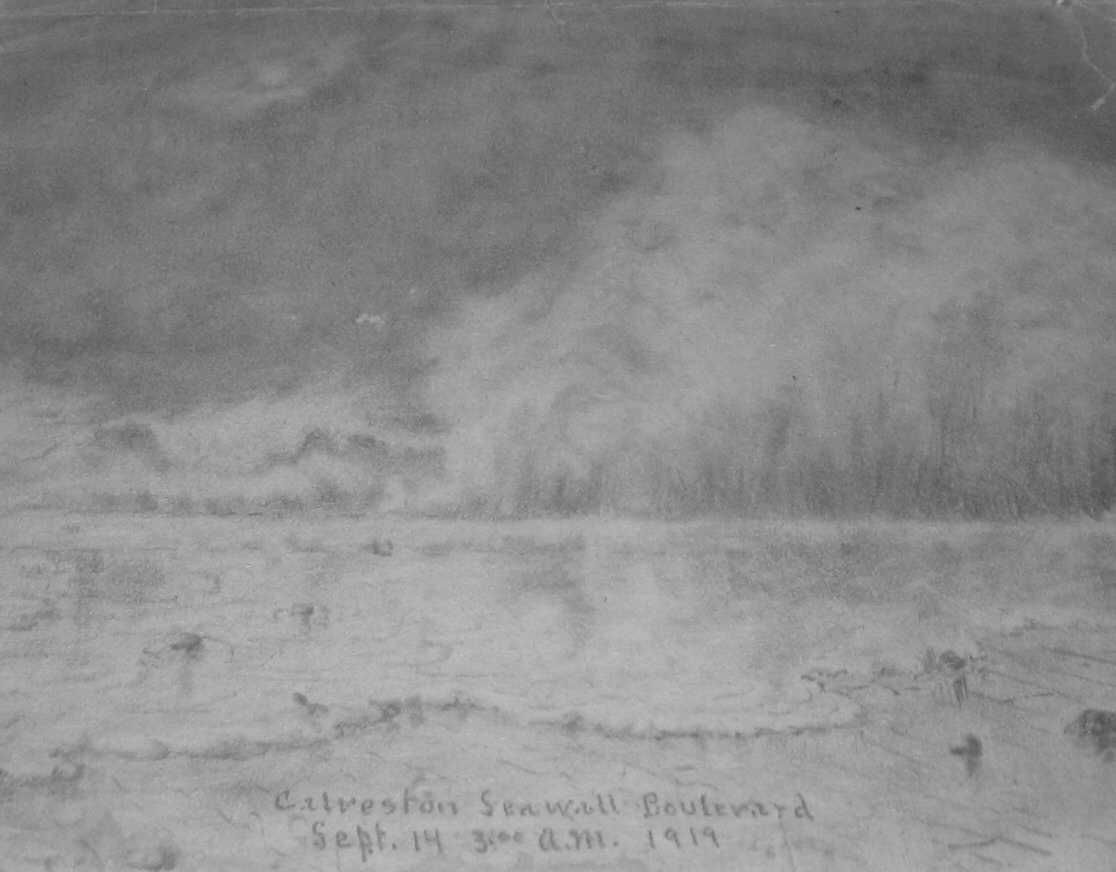
Sketch of 1919 storm done on September 14, 1919, at 3:00 am.

Schumann started out as a portrait and landscape painter but became best known for his later seascapes and harbor scenes. Writers have speculated that his preference for marine subjects was influenced by a childhood experience of falling into the mill race at his father's sawmill or by his cross-ocean journey at the age of three. One critic wrote that he "catches with unfailing dexterity the kinship of the sea with the sky and the land–the storm clouds, the pouty, sulky thunderheads, or the washed sky after an April shower." Schumann built model ships for use as models for his seascapes, which sometimes featured boats and ships ranging from fishing vessels to three-masted schooners.

During the 1910s, Schumann traveled extensively around the United States, painting in New Mexico, Arizona, Colorado, California, Illinois, and along the southeastern Atlantic Coast. His favorite site remained the Texas Gulf Coast, however, for its tropical colors and changeable skyscapes, and he became known as a leading interpreter of "typical Texas skies, as well as the deeper blues of the South Atlantic, and the quiet waters of the Pacific Coast."

Schumann belonged to a number of art associations, including the Art Association of New Orleans, Galveston Art League, Society of Independent Artists, Society of Texas Artists, Southern States Art League, and Texas Fine Arts Association.

Schumann exhibited his work frequently and over the course of his career won many exhibition awards, prizes, and medals. His work is held in the collections of a number of museums and institutions, including the Rosenberg Library (Galveston, Texas), Fort Worth Art Museum (Texas), the Panhandle-Plains Historical Museum (Texas), and Southwest Texas State University.

Schumann died of pancreatic cancer in 1946.

== Painting techniques ==
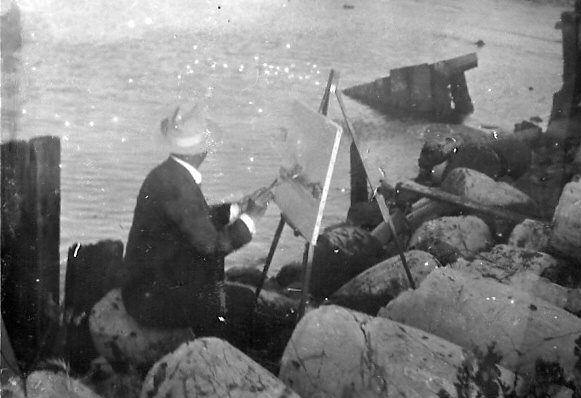
Painting in open air

Schumann began as a realist and evolved into an impressionist, likewise moving from brush to palette knife as his primary tool. Of his painting The Storm, he noted that he began with a brush and later used his fingers. His heavy impasto has been likened to that of Wayne Thiebaud.

Schumann's palette relied heavily on the primary colors, and he worked mainly in oils but also made watercolor, pen-and-ink, and crayola studies. He frequently worked outdoors, becoming a familiar figure to local fishermen, who would sometimes shift their boats around to help out his compositions.

In part because of an impressionist technique that did not allow for a great deal of overpainting, Schumann was a prolific artist who could turn out up to three canvases a day. He is credited with some 1500 paintings in 25 years and was able to support his family by his painting and private teaching even during the Depression years. As a teacher, Schumann was said to require his students to make drawings for five years before he would allow them to work with color.

== Critical reception ==
Critics have praised Schumann for the atmospheric intensity and vigor of his seascapes. One critic wrote that "in American art Mr. Schumann probably has no peer at capturing in oil dancing waters or a sailing ship on a glassy sea." The San Antonio Express admired his "clearness of colors, the warm tones of the afternoon reflected sunlight and lovely transparency in the wet beach sand, all aglow from the reflections of the June skies and their billowy sunlit clouds." A French critic termed his work "bold, direct and free" and called Schumann himself "a poet of exquisite sensibility." An American critic concluded that Schumann was "doing for the Texas Gulf shores what Winslow Homer did for the Coast of Maine," arguing that if he had been painting "along the New England Coast instead of the Gulf of Mexico, his marines would have been known over all the world."

== Selected exhibitions ==
- Galveston Art League (one-man: 1919, 1922–23, 1926, 1935, 1938)
- Annual Texas Artists Exhibition, Fort Worth (1923–37)
- Annual Exhibition of Texas Artists, Dallas Woman's Forum (1924 medal, 1927 purchase prize, 1932)
- Annual Exhibition of the Salons of America, New York (1925)
- Southern States Art League Annual Exhibition (1926, 1929 prize, 1930, 1932–34, 1936, 1938 honorable mention)
- Century of Progress Exposition, Chicago (1933)
- Elisabeth Ney Museum, Austin (1934 one-man)
- Art Association of New Orleans (1935 prize)
- Annual Mid-Western Artists Exhibition, Kansas City (Missouri) Art Institute (1935 popular prize)
- Texas Centennial Exposition, Dallas (1936)
- Museum of Fine Arts, Houston (1937 one-man)
- National Exhibition of American Art, Rockefeller Center, New York (1937)
- Sam Houston State University, Huntsville (1971 one-man)
- Texas by Texans, Texas House of Representatives Chamber, Austin (1974)
- Painters of Texas 1900-1950, Museums of Abilene (1989)
- Witte Memorial Museum, San Antonio; Victoria Art Association (purchase prize).

== Resources ==
- Large collection of Paul R. Schumann paintings
- Paul R. Schumann document collection
- Recollections of Paul A. Schumann, son of Paul R. Schumann
