= Burnet Elementary School =

Burnet Elementary School can refer to several schools, including:

- Burnet Elementary School (El Paso, Texas)
- Burnet Elementary School (Galveston, Texas)
- Burnet Elementary School (Houston, Texas)
