= George McCullough =

American football player (born 1975)

No. 28, 38, 24, 29
- Position: Cornerback

Personal information
- Born: February 18, 1975 (age 51); Galveston, Texas, U.S.
- Listed height: 5 ft 10 in (1.78 m)
- Listed weight: 187 lb (85 kg)

Career information
- High school: Ball (Galveston)
- College: Baylor (1993–1996)
- NFL draft: 1997: 5th round, 143rd overall pick

Career history
- Tennessee Oilers/Titans (1997–2000); → Barcelona Dragons (1998); Kansas City Chiefs (2001)*; San Francisco 49ers (2001); Ottawa Renegades (2002–2005)
- * Offseason or practice squad member only

Career NFL statistics
- Tackles: 49
- Forced fumbles: 2
- Passes defended: 2
- Stats at Pro Football Reference
- Stats at CFL.ca (archive)

George Wayne McCullough Jr. (born February 18, 1975) is an American former professional football player who was a cornerback for five seasons in the National Football League (NFL) with the Tennessee Oilers/Titans and San Francisco 49ers. He was selected by the Oilers in the fifth round of the 1997 NFL draft after playing college football for the Baylor Bears. He was also a member of the Barcelona Dragons of NFL Europe and the Ottawa Renegades of the Canadian Football League (CFL).

== Early life and college ==
George Wayne McCullough Jr. was born on February 18, 1975, in Galveston, Texas. He attended Ball High School in Galveston.

He lettered for the Baylor Bears from 1993 to 1996. He made one interception for the Bears in 1995 and two in 1996.

== Professional career ==
McCullough was selected by the Tennessee Oilers in the fifth round, with the 143rd overall pick, of the 1997 NFL draft. He officially signed with the team on July 19. He was waived on August 25 and signed to the Oilers's practice squad the next day. He was promoted to the active roster on December 12 and played in two games for the Oilers during the 1997 season, recording four solo tackles and one forced fumble. In 1998, McCullough was allocated to NFL Europe to play for the Barcelona Dragons during the 1998 NFL Europe season. He played in all ten games for the Dragons that year, accumulating 19 tackles, three interceptions for 89 yards and a touchdown, four pass breakups, two sacks, and one forced fumble. He appeared in seven games for the Oilers during the 1998 NFL season and made one assisted tackle. He played in five games for the newly-renamed Tennessee Titans in 1999, totaling four solo tackles and one pass breakup. After being inactive for the first three playoff games of the 1999–2000 NFL playoffs, he played in Super Bowl XXXIV against the St. Louis Rams. He played in 11 games during his final season with the Oilers in 2000, recording 16 solo tackles and two assisted tackles. He became a free agent after the 2000 season.

McCullough signed with the Kansas City Chiefs on May 10, 2001. He was released on September 2, 2001.

McCullough was signed by the San Francisco 49ers on September 12, 2001, and played in a career-high 15 games for the 49ers during the 2001 season, accumulating 20 solo tackles, two assisted tackles, one pass breakup, and one forced fumble. He also appeared in one playoff game that year, posting one solo tackle. He became a free agent after the 2001 season.

McCullough appeared in eight games for the Ottawa Renegades of the Canadian Football League during their inaugural season in 2002, totaling 15 tackles, two interceptions for 79 yards and a touchdown, two pass breakups, nine kickoff returns for 149 yards, and three punt returns for 83 yards. He played in 12 games in 2003, recording 32 tackles, three pass breakups, and one fumble recovery. McCullough played in 11 games during the 2004 season, accumulating 37 tackles, one interception for 62 yards and a touchdown, two pass breakups, and one fumble recovery. He re -signed with the Renegades in March 2005. He was placed on injured reserve on June 18, 2005. He did not dress in any games for the Renegades in 2005.
