= Carl Hilton =

American football player (born 1964)

No. 82
- Position: Tight end

Personal information
- Born: February 28, 1964 (age 62); Galveston, Texas, U.S.
- Listed height: 6 ft 3 in (1.91 m)
- Listed weight: 232 lb (105 kg)

Career information
- High school: Ball (Galveston)
- College: Houston
- NFL draft: 1986: 7th round, 179th overall pick

Career history
- Minnesota Vikings (1986–1989)

Awards and highlights
- First-team All-American (1984)

Career NFL statistics
- Receptions: 3
- Receiving yards: 17
- Touchdowns: 3
- Stats at Pro Football Reference

Carl Patrick Hilton (born February 28, 1964) is an American former professional football player who was a tight end for four seasons in the National Football League (NFL).

Hilton was born and raised in Galveston, Texas and played scholastically at Ball High School. He played collegiately for the Houston Cougars, where, as a junior, he was honored by The Sporting News as a first-team All-American.

Hilton was selected by the Minnesota Vikings in the seventh-round of the 1986 NFL draft. Mainly used for his blocking, he caught three career passes, all touchdowns, for 17 yards.
