= Central High School (Galveston, Texas) =

Former school in Texas, United States

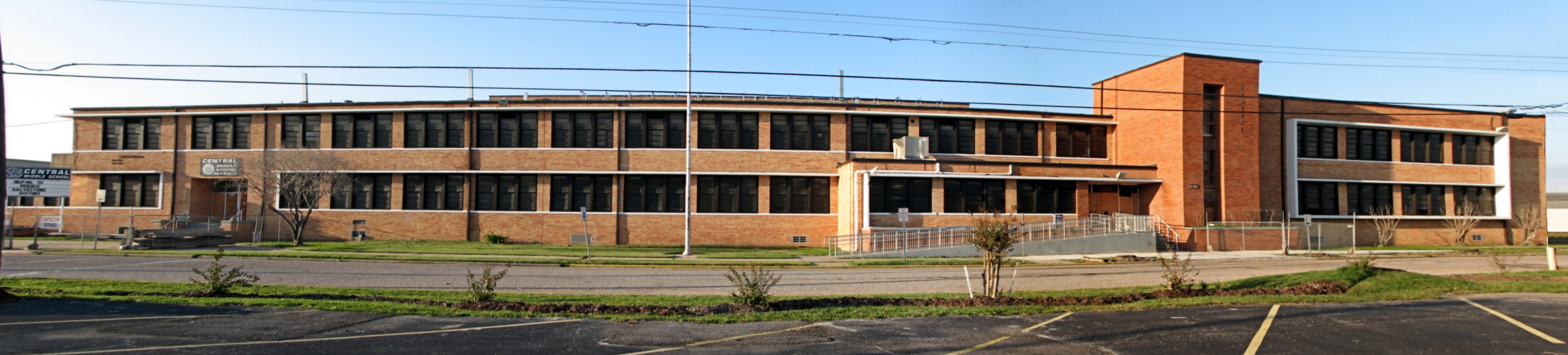
- The current Central Middle School building, formerly Central High School

Location
- Galveston, Texas; United States
- 29.2990°N 94.8012°W

Information
- Former name: Central Colored School
- Established: 1885
- Closed: 1968
- School district: Galveston Independent School District
- Yearbook: The Bearcat
- Graduates (1968): 210
- Last updated: 29 December 2017

Central High School was a senior high school for African-American students in Galveston, Texas. It was a part of the Galveston Independent School District (GISD).

Lorraine Smith Tigner, quoted in the Galveston County Daily News, stated that Central, established as the Central School in 1885, was the first Texas school for black people. In its first year Central had 125 students. It was renamed Central High School the following year.

In 1949 it had 700 students. At the time fewer than 5% of the students who graduated attended universities and colleges.

In 1968 the school was consolidated with Ball High School, previously the school for white students. At that time the building was converted to Central Middle School, which was also an integrated facility.

== Campus ==
The original school building had been built circa 1900 and added on to 30 years later. In 1949 the cafeteria, located in the school's basement, was so small that the seating for students eating their meals was in the first floor gymnasium. There was no proper playground since the lot designated for it was filled with three frame shacks, which had been moved to the school property to provide additional classroom space. With inadequate school yard area, students instead used an area alley for recreation. The students used the Colored Branch of the Rosenberg Library for research and study halls as the school did not have a library of its own. The frame shacks, which first received electricity in 1948, held a variety of classes. One shack was used for band classes; one held art, drawing, mechanics, and science classes; and one held the school's health classes. Bill Cherry of The Galveston County Daily News stated that while, by 1949, all GISD facilities were under-maintained, Central High School was the one that "blatantly showed" the deepest "lack of respect of its pupils’ human dignity".

The Galveston school district was planning to replace the Central High School and Ball High School facilities aim the early 1050’s. Central High School was moved to its new building on Sealy Street in 1954. This location now serves as a junior high.

== Curriculum ==
According to a 1949 Galveston County Daily News article by Bill Cherry regarding the poor state of Galveston schools, the school offered health, band, science, mechanical, drawing, art, and home economics. The only vocational classes offered at the school in 1949 were sewing, and woodwork classes. At the time of the article, the home economics courses used cooking ranges dating from 1910.

== Alumni ==
- Maud Cuney Hare

== See also ==
- Education in Galveston, Texas
