= O'Connell College Preparatory School =

Private, coeducational school in Galveston, Texas, United States

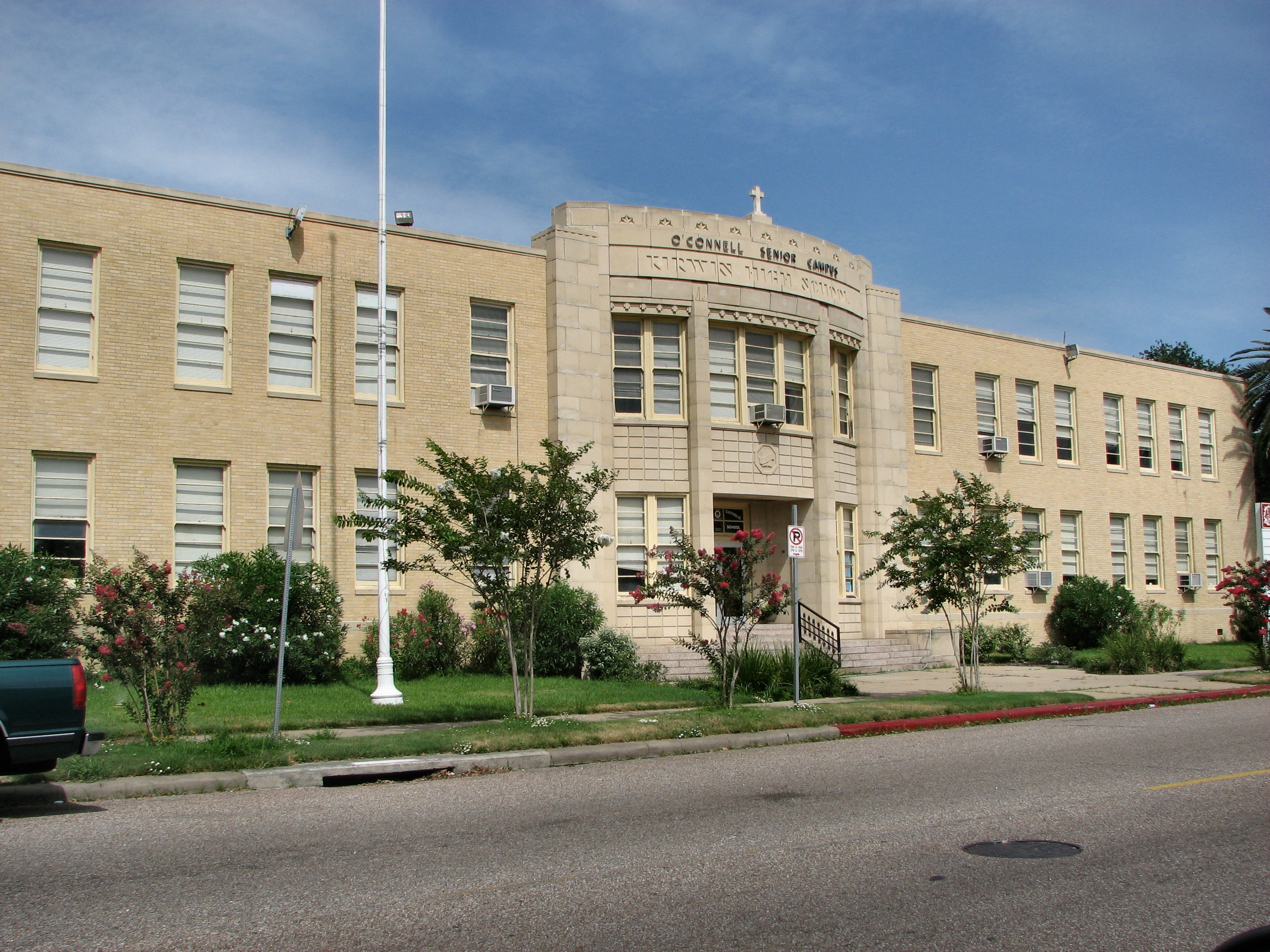

Location
- 1320 Tremont; Galveston, (Galveston County), Texas 77550; United States
- 29°17′49″N 94°47′26″W

Information
- Type: Private, Coeducational
- Religious affiliation: Christian
- Denomination: Roman Catholic
- Established: 1967
- Founder: Ursuline Academy Founded 1847 Dominican High School Founded 1882 Kirwin High School Founded 1927 O'Connell High School Founded 1968 O'Connell College Preparatory School Founded 2007 - Present
- School board: President Mr. Wayne Mallia Vice President Mr. Trey Appffel Members Ms. Stephanie Doyle Mr. John Cartwright Ms. Tammy Jacobs Fr. Jude Ezuma
- Oversight: Archdiocese of Galveston-Houston
- Principal: Mrs. Patti Abbott
- Grades: 9–12
- Student to teacher ratio: 15:1
- Colors: Red and Black
- Athletics conference: TAPPS
- Team name: Buccaneers
- Accreditation: Catholic Schools Accreditation Agency
- Newspaper: The O'Chronicle
- Tuition: $8,300
- Communities served: Galveston County, Texas
- Feeder schools: Holy Family Catholic School, Our Lady of Fatima, True Cross Catholic, Ambassador Preparatory Academy, Mainland Preparatory Academy, Trinity Episcopal
- Athletic Director: Mr. Derek Martin
- Website: http://www.oconnellprep.com

O'Connell College Preparatory School (formerly O'Connell Consolidated High School) is a 4-year coeducational parochial/private high school in Galveston, Texas, United States that offers university-preparatory programs. It was founded in 1968 as a consolidation of Galveston Island's three existing Catholic high schools: Kirwin High School (Boys, founded in 1927) and Dominican High School (Girls, founded in 1882) and Ursuline Academy (Girls, founded in 1847) and is the only Roman Catholic high school in Galveston County.

== History ==
In the fall of 1968, the religious orders operating the three schools agreed on consolidation as a means of continuing Catholic secondary education in Galveston, offering a broader curriculum than was possible in any of the three smaller high schools. Bishop John Morkovsky, S.T.D., approved the plan and appointed a board of trustees composed of laymen and priests representing all the parishes in Galveston County. The Board named the newly consolidated school after the Right Rev. Monsignor Daniel P. O’Connell, P.A., pastor of St. Mary’s Cathedral in Galveston from 1933 until his death in 1966, and a longtime supporter of Catholic education.

In 2003, after incurring many years of financial debt, Archbishop Joseph Fiorenza announced O’Connell High School would close at the end of the 2003-2004 school year.

Archbishop Fiorenza offered to allow the school to remain open, if funding could be secured that would enable the school to operate without any subsidy from the archdiocese.

In the spring of 2004 a plan was presented to the Archbishop in which a private foundation, the O’Connell Foundation, would be established with funds from alumni and others in the community. The foundation would offset any expenses previously covered by the archdiocese, as well as provide for the lease of the campus, which the Archbishop wanted to sell.

Archbishop Fiorenza approved the plan and on July 1, 2004 the school was reopened as O’Connell Consolidated High School. In the spring of 2007, the school's board of trustees decided to rename the school O'Connell College Preparatory School, to help distinguish it from other local public and private schools of secondary education.

In 2013 O'Connell was awarded a 5 million dollar grant by the Moody Foundation. as reported in the Texas Catholic Herald on February 26, 2013.

In 2018 O'Connell's graduating class received over 1.6 million dollars in scholarship funding, breaking their current record.

== See also ==
- Education in Galveston, Texas
- List of schools in the Roman Catholic Archdiocese of Galveston-Houston
