= Galveston Independent School District =

School district in Texas, United States

Coordinates: 29.2803°N 94.8055°W

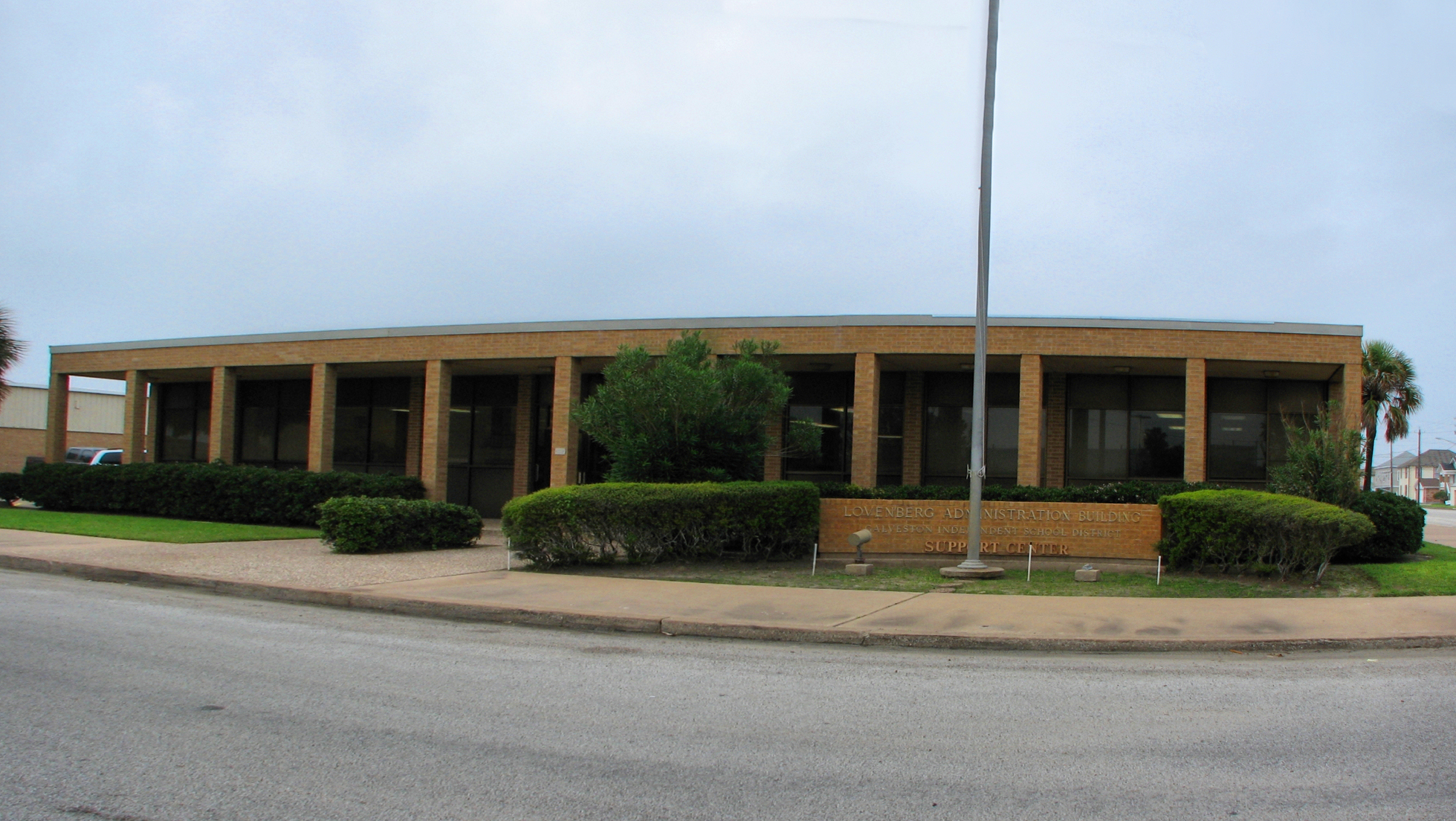
- Galveston ISD Administration Building

Address
- 3904 Avenue T Galveston, Texas, 77550; United States

District information
- Type: Public
- Grades: PK–12
- Established: 1881 by the City of Galveston, 1949 as an Independent School District
- President: Anthony Brown, Board of Trustees President
- Superintendent: Dr. Matthew Neighbors
- Schools: 13
- NCES District ID: 4820280

Students and staff
- Teachers: 466.22 (on an FTE basis) (2023–2024)
- Staff: 613.56 (on an FTE basis) (2023–2024)
- Student–teacher ratio: 13.83 (2023–2024)

Other information
- Website: www.gisd.org

Galveston Independent School District is a school district headquartered in Galveston, Texas, United States.

The Texas Education Agency rated the school district with a grade of B in 2026.

== Catchment area ==
Galveston ISD takes students from the cities of Galveston and Jamaica Beach. Galveston ISD also serves unincorporated areas of Galveston County, including the communities of Port Bolivar and Crystal Beach on the Bolivar Peninsula.

As of 2022 GISD uses a "freedom of choice" model in which a student may seek to attend any school in the district if the school has a seat for the given student. The district only provides school bus transportation on the Bolivar Peninsula for the Crenshaw K-8 School. For the campuses in Galveston, the district will provide transportation to any part of GISD. In previous eras Galveston ISD house or residential area was assigned to an elementary school and a middle school. In Port Bolivar, the houses and residential areas are zoned to a K-8 center. All high school students in Galveston ISD were zoned to attend Ball High School.

Galveston College serves the catchment area of Galveston ISD.

== History ==
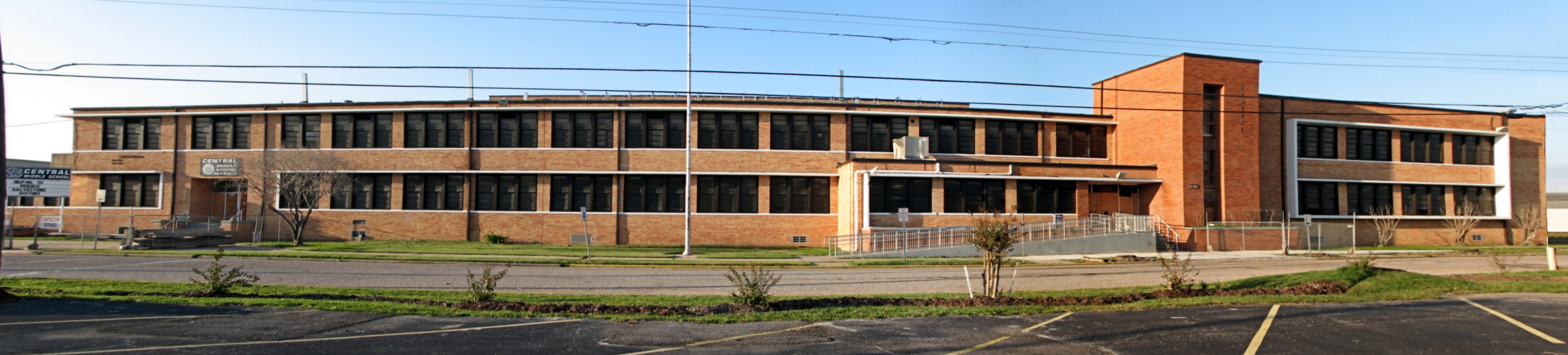
The current Central Middle School building, formerly Central High School.

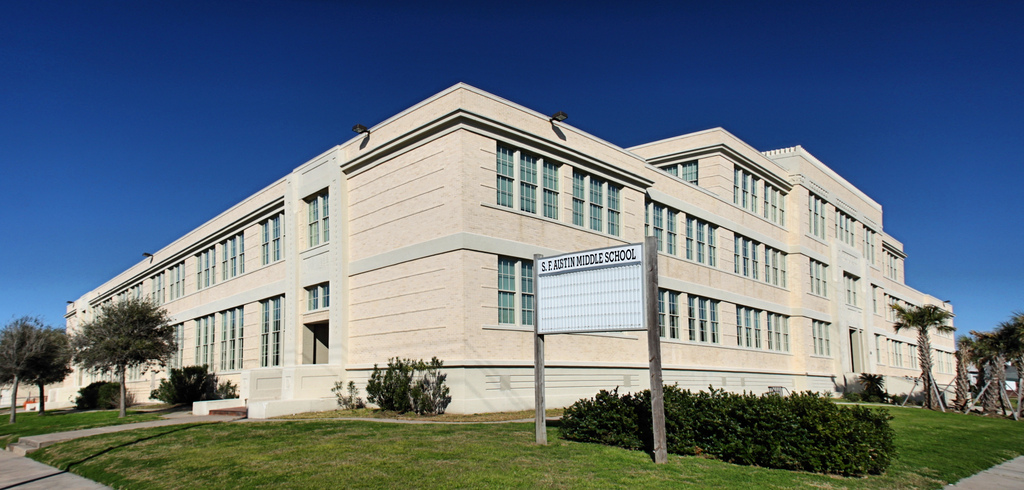
Constructed in 1939, the Stephen F. Austin Junior High building now houses a middle-school level magnet school.

In 1881, the citizens of Galveston, authorized by the Legislative Act 1879 which specified that all cities of a certain size could initiate and maintain their own school system, organized a public school district and elected a board of trustees. Some 20 teachers were employed to teach students in grades one through seven. Prior to this time, all education in Galveston was private or parochial.

In the summer of 1883, a local dry goods businessman, George Ball, offered to finance the construction of new schools. Ball's offer was accepted, and the cornerstone for what would become Ball High School was laid on February 15, 1884. Ball died on March 11, 1884, without seeing his gift completed. Ball High School opened its doors to 200 pupils on October 1, 1884, with a building consisting of 12 classrooms, two offices and an auditorium. According to Gary Cartwright's "Galveston, A History of the Island", two aldermen pressured the school board to open the new school to all races. At first, the school board agreed to do that but changed its mind when Ball's heirs offered to give another $10,000 if the high school was only for white students. Susan Wiley Hardwick's Mythic Galveston: Reinventing America's Third Coast documents that Central High School was opened as a high school for black students in a storefront in 1885. Central High and Ball High merged into one high school in 1968.

Public schools in Galveston were operated by the city from 1884 until 1949 when Galveston ISD was established by the Texas Legislature.

=== Enrollment decline ===
The enrollment declined by 1,147 from 1995 to 1996.

In the 2000s skyrocketing home prices were created by the completion of many high-rise projects have forced many middle-class Galveston residents to move off of the island to many cities, including Texas City, League City, and La Marque. Galveston ISD's tax base grew by 13% in 2005. Including all students, GISD lost 8% of its students (780) between the 2002–2003 school year and the 2006–2007 school year, with a 7% loss (610) in 2006. The district lost 12% of its students during the same years when Hurricane Katrina evacuees and out-of-district students were excluded.

Galveston ISD lost students to mainland school districts such as Clear Creek ISD and Dickinson ISD. District enrollment fell by 101 students from 2004–2005 to 2005–2006. The district missed 772 students on October 30, 2006. Elementary school enrollment had dropped about 2.3 percent from the 1996–1997 school year to the 2006–2007 school year. If the trend continues for fall 2007, the district would lose 300 students to the newly opened Ambassadors Preparatory School, a charter school, in addition to 94 students, translating to a loss of 10.6% of the district's total elementary school students. At the end of 2006, GISD's total enrollment was about 8,700. From 2006 to 2007 enrollment fell by 642. In January 2007 the middle schools had 934 vacant slots while the elementary schools had 834 vacant slots.

On January 2, 2007, the Galveston County Daily News published a report about parents frustrated over plans to close Scott Elementary School. The District Education Council approved a GISD plan to close multiple schools. On May 15, 2007, the Houston Chronicle reported that the League of United Latin American Citizens, in an attempt to prevent schools from closing, filed a complaint with the U.S. federal government asserting that GISD violated a desegregation order. Pat Guseman, an official with Pasa Demographics, predicted that GISD would lose about 1,468 students in the five years after 2007. Guseman said that many of the student losses would originate from the East End of the island. The demographer, characterizing the change in Galveston demographics as "Hamptonization", stated that economically disadvantaged children and Hispanic children are increasing, while African-American children are decreasing, as of 2007. Guseman cited increasing private school enrollment, increasing costs of housing, and a dearth of local employment as reasons for the loss of students in Galveston. During that year, Christine Hopkins, a spokesperson for the district, said that the housing costs and perceptions of GISD schools caused many families to move from the GISD area.

Before Hurricane Ike hit Galveston in September 2008, GISD had 7,900 students. After Ike hit Galveston, the district lost 25% of its total enrollment. Burnet and Scott Elementary Schools and Central Middle School received severe damage; the district said the schools would not open in fall 2009. In March 2009 GISD cut 163 positions, including 99 teaching positions; 40% of the total cut positions had already been vacant.

In the fall of 2009, the district had 6,235 students, 1,665 fewer than the previous year. This was a 20% decrease from pre-Ike. The district had expected 6,000 students to be enrolled during the 2009–2010 school year; it had 235 more than expected.

=== School configuration change plans ===
In March 2007, Galveston ISD announced that it would introduce plans to change the configurations of its elementary and middle schools within the city of Galveston.

Some parents expressed concern about consolidating the middle schools, because Weis and Central had different student demographics, with Weis having a wealthier student body.

Ending in the 2007–2008 school year, Galveston ISD operates:

- Six elementary schools including grades Pre-Kindergarten through 5
- One school including grades Pre-Kindergarten through 8
- Three middle schools with grades 6 through 8
- One high school with grades 9 through 12

After spring 2008, Alamo Elementary School would be converted into a multi-purpose center.

Starting in the 2008–2009 school year, Galveston ISD would operate four PreK-4 elementary schools and two K-4 elementary schools.

Weis Middle School would become a 5–6 school. Central Middle School would become a 7–8 school. Austin Middle School would become a magnet school for grades 5–8.

Now GISD is configured in

- 4 Pre-K through 4th grade elementary schools.
- 2 K through 4th grade elementary schools.
- 1 5th grade through 6th grade middle school.
- 1 7th grade through 8th grade middle school.
- 1 5th grade through 8th grade magnet school.
- 1 9th grade through 12th grade high school.

=== Post-Hurricane Ike ===
Galveston schools reopened in October 2008.

== GISD Police ==
Galveston ISD Police Department is a school district police department established under the provision of the Texas Education Code. The department was established during the 1967–68 school year to assist during the consolidation of Central High School (an African American school) into the all Caucasian Ball High School to bring an end to segregation of schools in Galveston ISD.

== Dress codes ==
All elementary and middle school students residing in Galveston Island are required to wear school uniforms. Crenshaw School students are not required to wear school uniforms.

Ball High School has a detailed dress code requiring solid-colored polo shirts, turtlenecks, solid-colored trousers, and blue denim jeans.

Students in Ball Preparatory Academy wear the same as Greater Ball High School.

== GISD TV ==
Galveston ISD has its own TV channel available on Comcast Cable channel 17. The channel includes current information about the school district including recent news in short video clips; school board meetings are also shown.

== List of schools ==
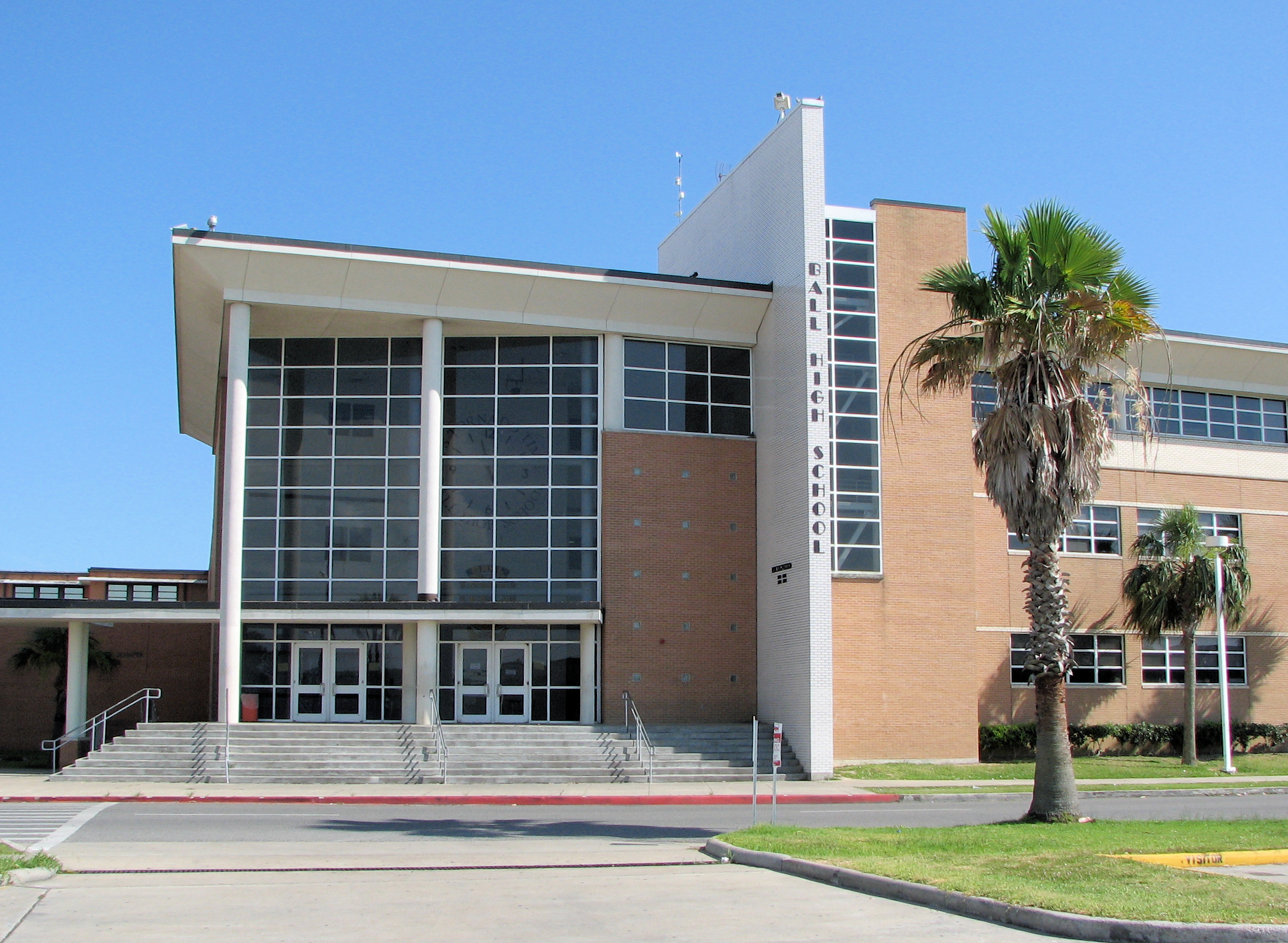
Ball High School

=== Secondary schools ===
==== High schools ====
Zoned

- Ball High School (Galveston)

Open enrollment

- Aim High School (Galveston) – Accelerated High School
- Galveston Early College High School

==== Middle schools ====
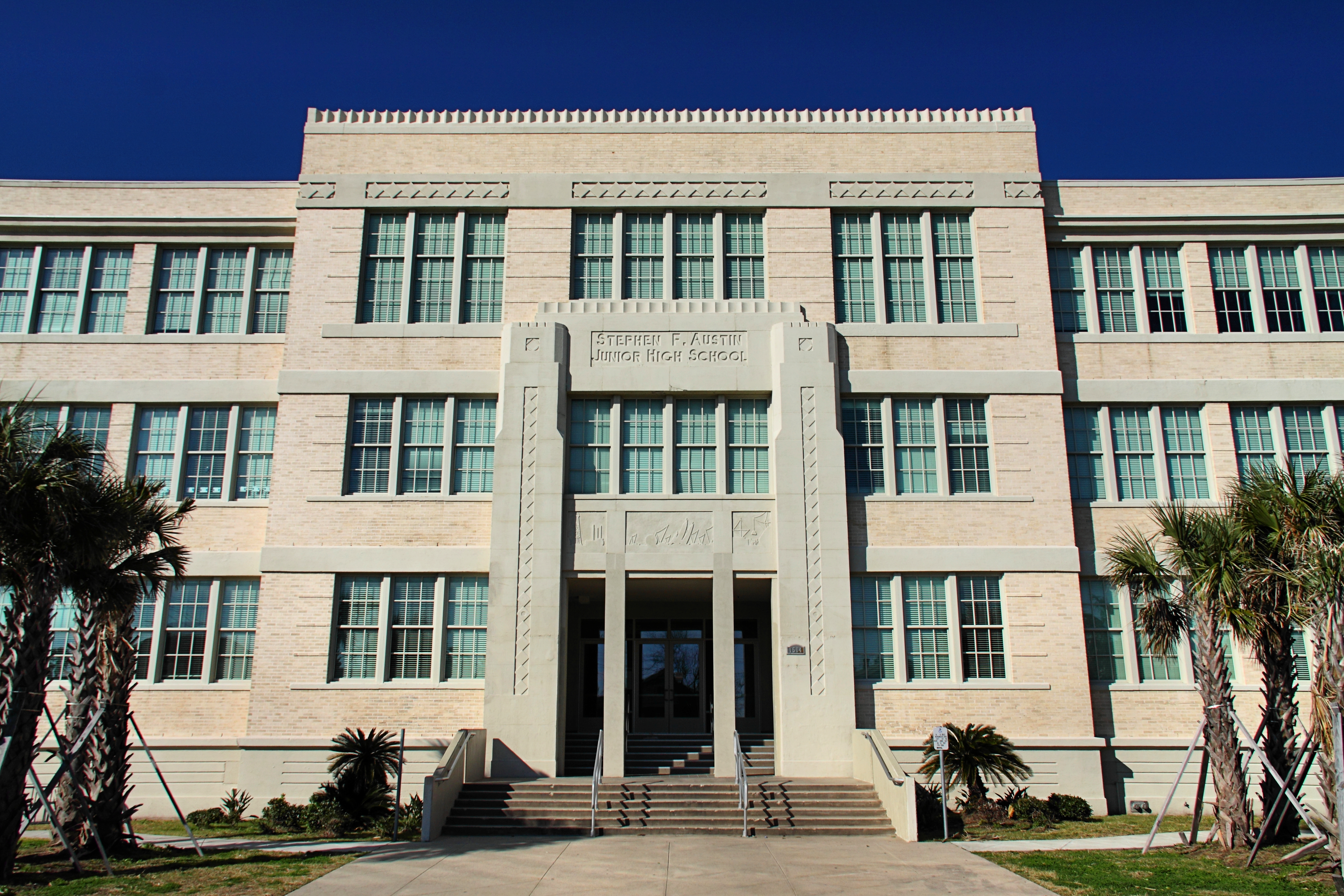
Stephen F. Austin Magnet Middle School.

Comprehensive

- 7–8: Central Middle School (Galveston, constructed 1954)
  - Before the consolidation and realignment of GISD middle schools, Central had a mostly African American student body. In 2006, 80% of Central's students were socioeconomically disadvantaged, and 92% were racial and ethnic minorities. In 2006 there were reports of a decline in student discipline.
- 5–6: Weis Middle School (Galveston, constructed 1965)
  - Before the consolidation and realignment of GISD middle schools, Weis had a more White and more affluent student body than other GISD middle schools. As of 2006, 46% of the students were socioeconomically disadvantaged and 37% were racial and ethnic minorities.

Former Magnet

- 5–8 Stephen F. Austin Magnet Middle School (Galveston, constructed by the PWA in 1939)
  - Before Austin was changed from a zoned school to a magnet school, 80% of the students were socioeconomically disadvantaged, and 84% were racial and ethnic minorities.

From the 2022–2023 school year Weis will begin to be a 5th grade-only school, Austin will only have 6th graders, and Central will only have grades 7 and 8.

From the 2024–2025 school year Austin will change to an elementary school, consolidating the populations of the former Morgan and Rosenberg elementary schools, which will be closed.

=== K-8 schools ===
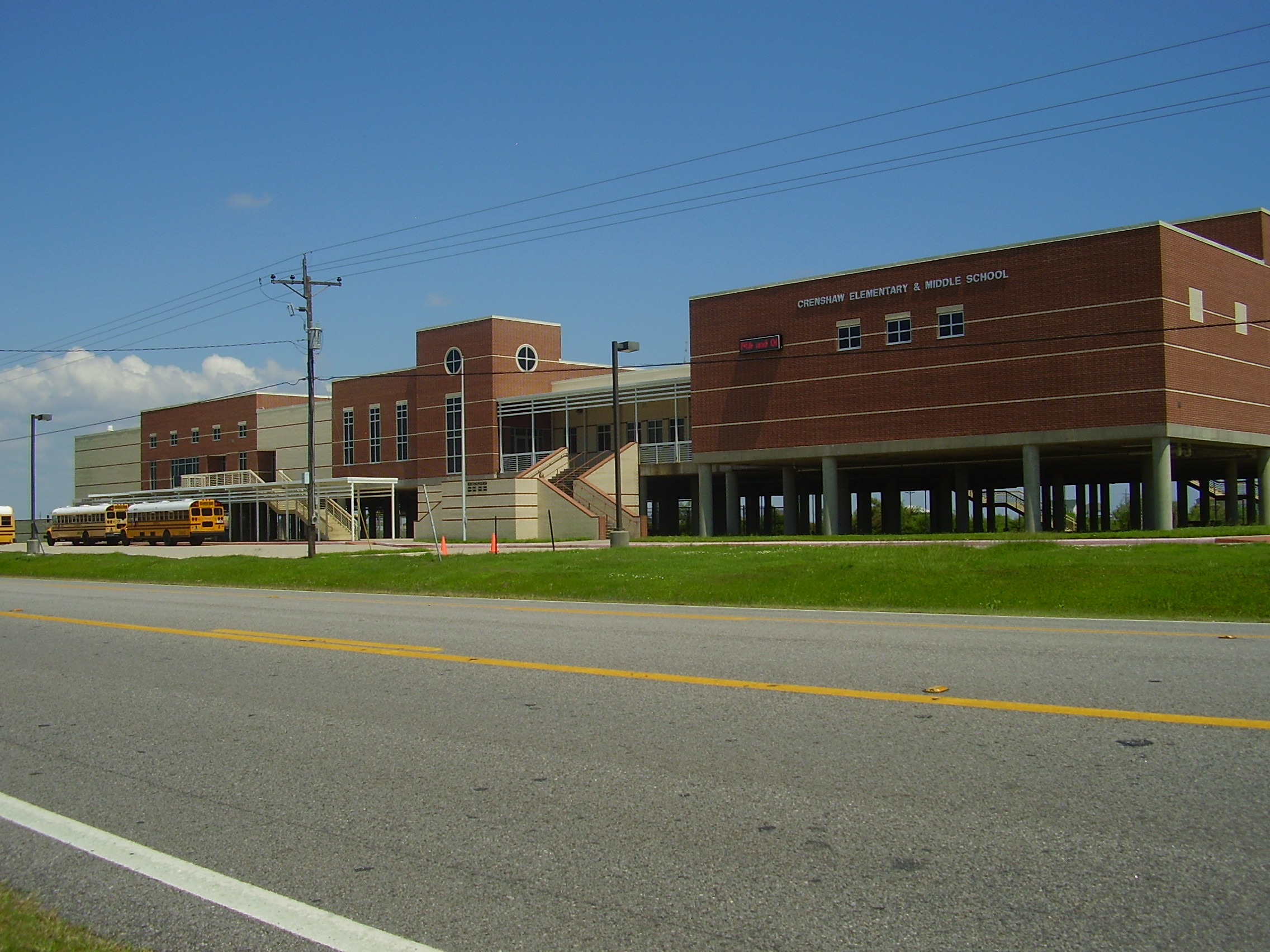
Crenshaw School

Zoned:

- Crenshaw Elementary and Middle School (Unincorporated area, Constructed 2005)
  - The current Crenshaw campus is at Texas State Highway 87 and Helen Drive in Crystal Beach, on land donated by a third party. The 56,000 square feet (5,200 m^{2}) building, designed by Bay Architects, was built off of the ground and as a hurricane shelter. It includes a cafeteria that includes a stage and a gymnasium. Carter Thompson of the Galveston County Daily News wrote "A slight nautical theme shows up in a lobby that resembles a wheelhouse." The previous Crenshaw facility was two separate campuses, in Port Bolivar.

=== Primary schools ===
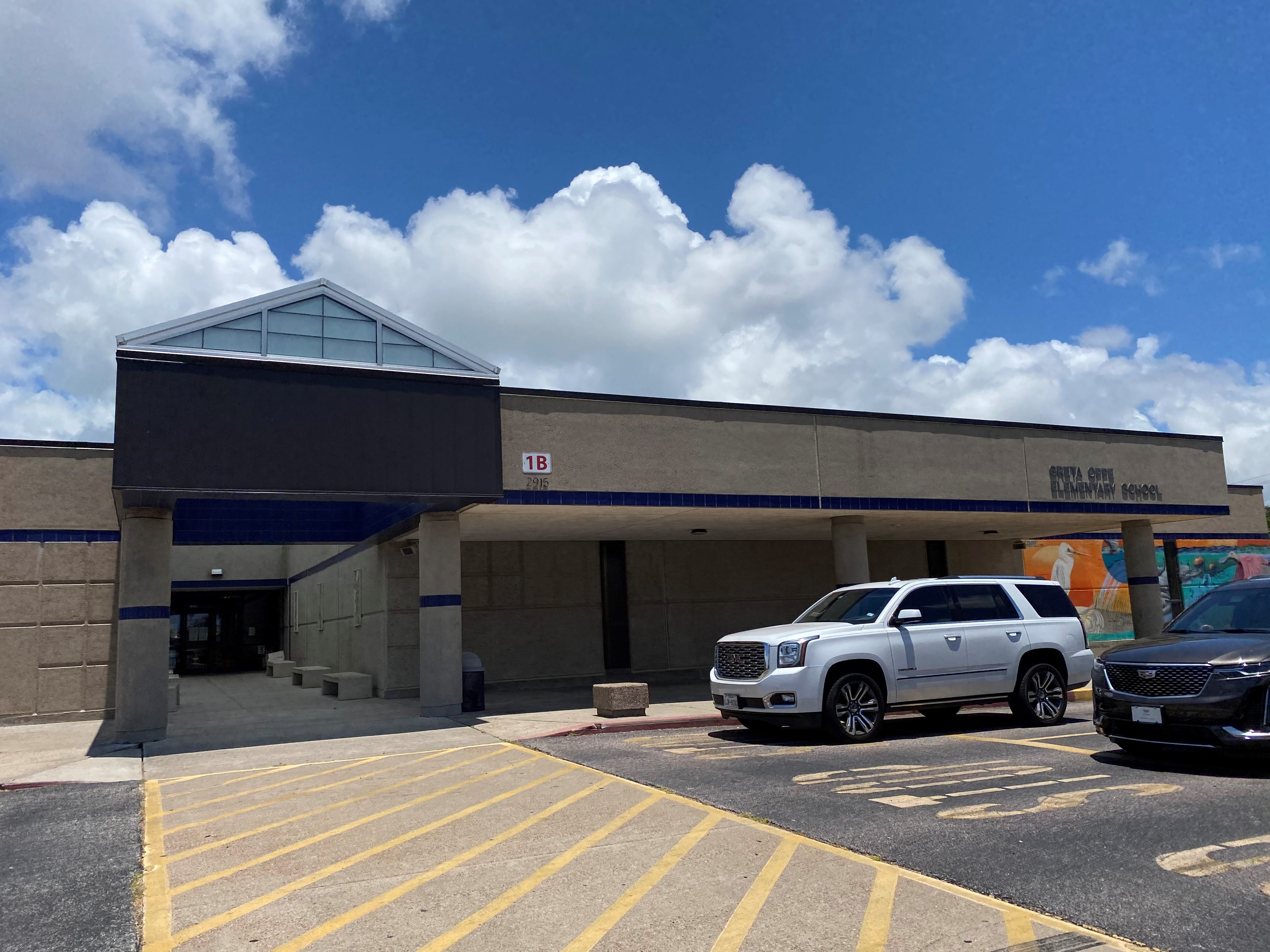
Greta Oppe Elementary School in west Galveston

All of the following schools are in Galveston.

- Greta Oppe Elementary School (PK4-4)
  - Greta Oppe was named after a high school chemistry teacher. GISD decided to build the school due to an increase in students from the West End of Galveston. The $3.9 million campus opened in 1987. It is near Scholes Airport and Moody Gardens.
  - In 2006 Oppe had a student body that was more White and more affluent than other GISD elementary schools. As of that year, 37% of the students were racial and ethnic minorities, and 39% were socioeconomically disadvantaged.
- Gladnieo Parker Elementary School (PK4-4)

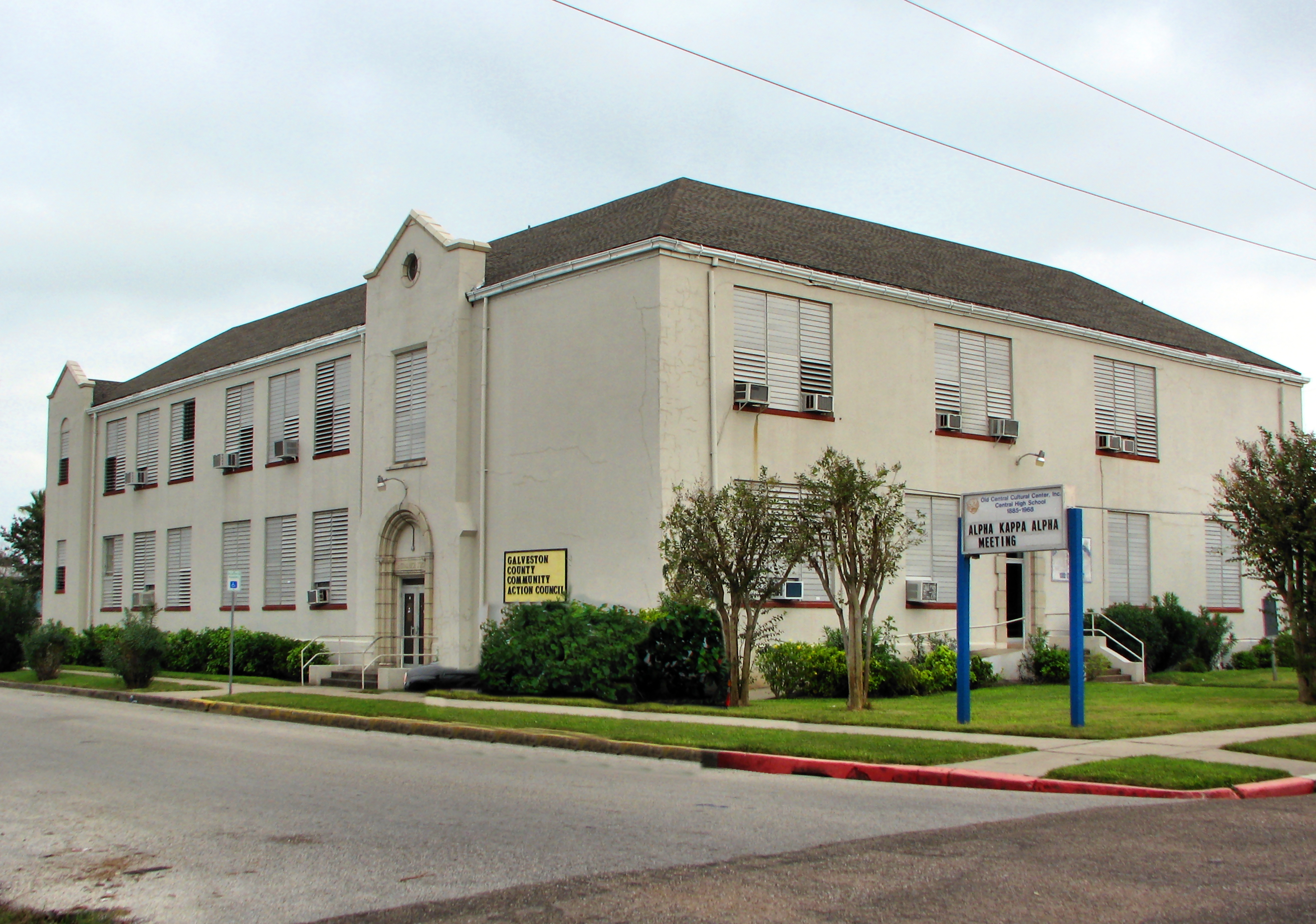
The 1894 Central High School building and attached former branch of the Rosenberg Library for African Americans.

Unzoned:

- Burnet Early Childhood University Magnet School (magnet school)
- Austin Elementary School (formerly Austin Middle School)

== Former schools ==
=== Former secondary schools ===
==== Former high schools ====
- Central High School (Galveston) (First African-American segregated high school in Texas, now holds Central Middle School )
- Ball High North (Galveston) (demolished in 2024), the secondary campus, and Ball High (called Ball South) was the main campus. Students attended classes at both buildings.

==== Former middle schools ====
- Lovenberg Junior High School (Galveston) demolished – 1980

=== Former elementary schools ===
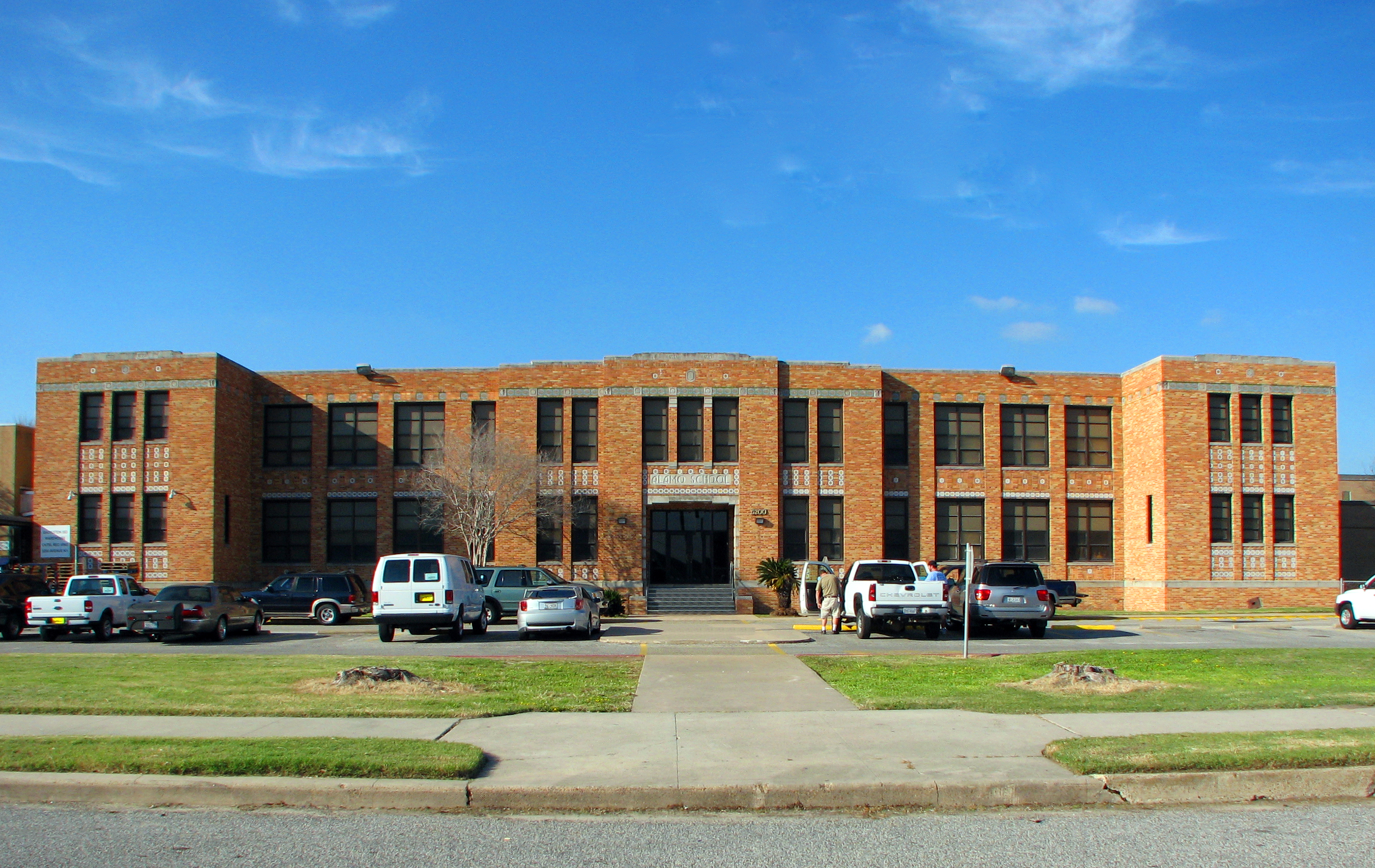
Alamo Elementary School

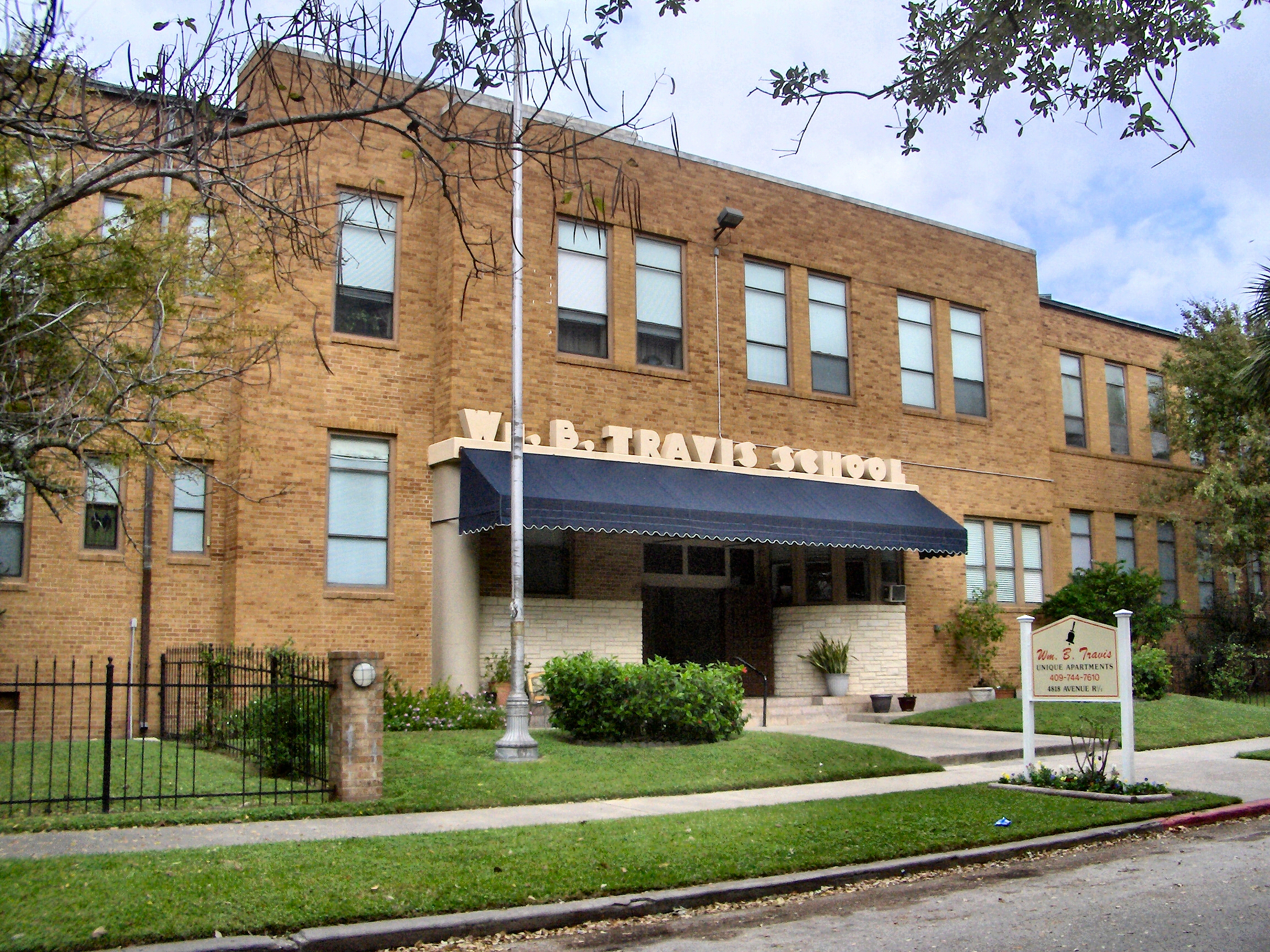
Former William B. Travis Elementary

- Alamo Elementary School (closed 2007)
  - At the end of the school's life, 95% of the student body was Hispanic and African-American. Of the GISD school zones, Alamo had the second highest population of Hispanic students, after Burnet Elementary School. A demographer said that, between March and October 2007, the Alamo school zone was the only area in Galveston that gained children. As of March 2007, almost 500 students resided in the Alamo zone. This is a higher number than the numbers residing in the Rosenberg, Morgan, and San Jacinto zones. Some critics of the school district said that this proves that GISD closed the wrong school. Lynne Cleveland, the superintendent, argued that the correct school closed because Alamo had the fewest students in any school, showing that not every student living in the zone went to that school. Cleveland said that it was not feasible for GISD to continue staffing such a small school. Between 2001 and 2007 all GISD elementary schools had population decreases. Alamo's population fell by 90 students, making up 16% of the district population. Alamo lost fewer students than other schools.
  - The building is currently used as storage and was used for the district alternative education program for students with discipline problems before mid-2008. Cleveland said that because Alamo was the district's oldest elementary school, and the costliest to maintain, it was the best choice for closure.
  - As of the 2024–2025 school year the building houses AIM, DAEP, and the district's IT department.
- Burnet Elementary School (PK-4)
  - After Hurricane Ike damaged the school, pre-kindergarten and bilingual students attended Oppe while all other students attended Parker. In fall 2009 Burnet was temporarily closed, due to Ike's damage. It is now a Magnet School.
- Davy Crockett Elementary School (closed by 1978)
- Henry Rosenberg Elementary School (PK-4)
  - Between 2001 and 2007, Rosenberg Elementary lost 188 students, a 33% decrease in the population.
  - In March 2009 GISD signed a contract with the Knowledge is Power Program (KIPP), a charter school program, so KIPP could open a charter school in a GISD campus. In the northern hemisphere fall of that year, KIPP Coastal Village School opened in the Rosenberg Elementary facility. The two schools shared the same campus.
- San Jacinto Elementary School (closed 2006) (Students attending San Jacinto were reassigned to various schools ) The building is currently used for the district's alternative education program for students with discipline problems.
  - Between 2001 and 2007 San Jacinto lost 178 students, a 36% decrease.
- Charles B. Scott Elementary School (PK4-4)
  - Scott opened in the former Ball High School North facility in 1996 after renovations occurred. Murals were installed after the school opened. Between 2001 and 2007, Scott lost 160 students, a 22% decrease in the student body. After Scott was damaged in Hurricane Ike in 2008, students with family names beginning in the letters A through L attended Rosenberg Elementary, while others were assigned to Morgan Elementary. In the fall of 2009 Scott remained closed due to Ike damage.
- William B. Travis Elementary School – Opened in 1948 and relieved Alamo and Crockett schools. – Closed in the 1970s. Sold and converted to apartments
- L.A. Morgan Elementary School – consolidated with Rosenberg Elementary to form Austin Elementary School for the 2024–2025 school year.

== Athletic facilities ==
As of 2010, Kermit Courville Stadium is the district's stadium. The stadium was 62 years old as of January 22, 2010, Before 2010 GISD was deciding whether to renovate Courville Stadium. If the district decided to renovate Courville stadium, it would have had to purchase 75 structures, including a church, to build enough parking spaces. Galveston law requires one parking space per 200-square-foot (19 m^{2}) of building space, and Courville, which had 140 parking spaces, did not have the sufficient number specified by law; if GISD renovated it, it would have been required to create the legally specified number of parking spaces. When people attend events at Courville, many park on streets around the stadium and in a grassy lot north of the stadium.

The stadium underwent extensive renovation in 2023.

== See also ==
- List of school districts in Texas
- Education in Galveston, Texas
