= Dominican High School (Galveston, Texas) =

Information
- Type: Private, all girl
- Religious affiliation: Roman Catholic
- Established: 1882
- Closed: 1968
- Grades: 8-12
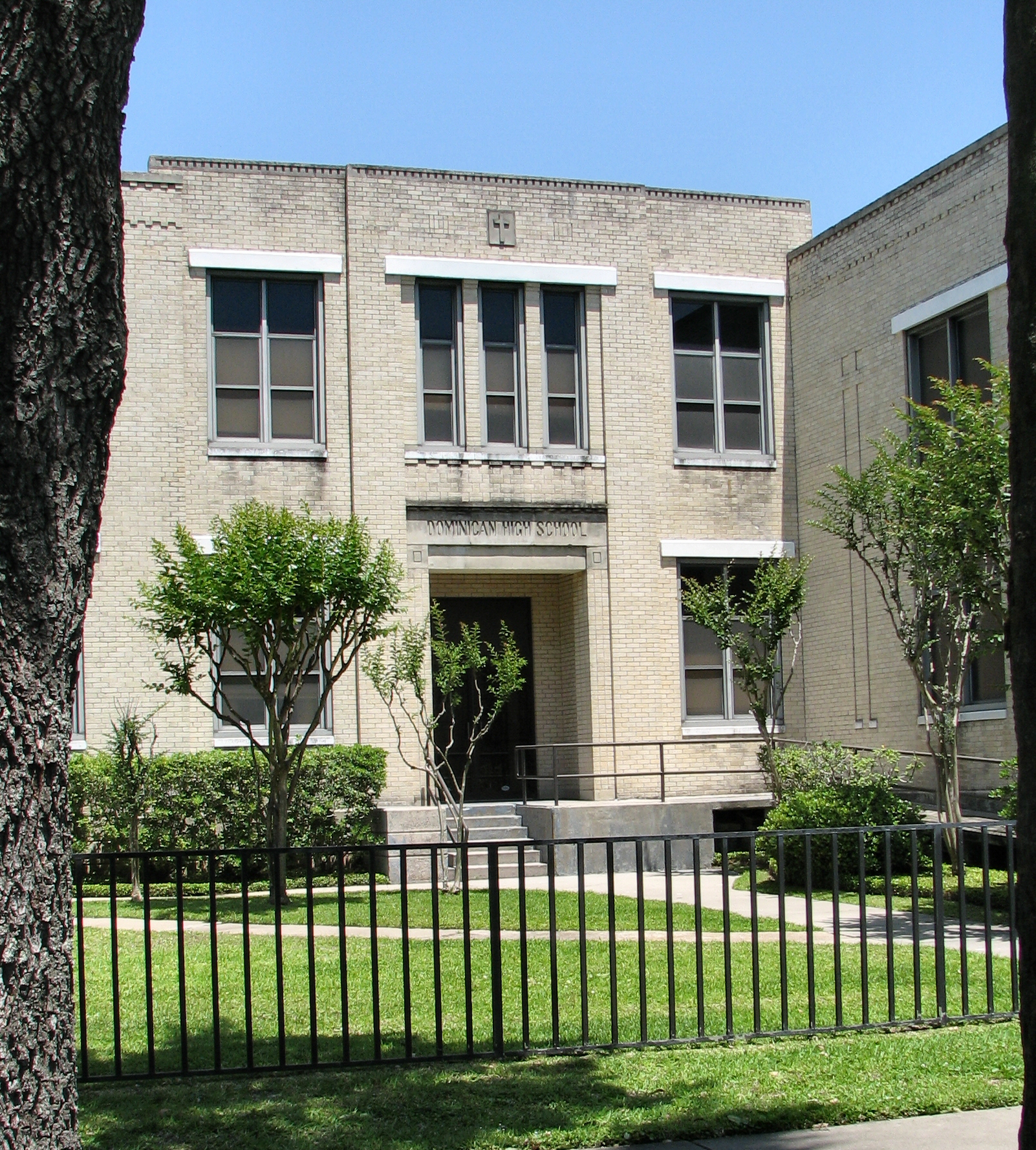

Dominican High School was a Catholic high school that existed in Galveston, Texas, United States from 1882 to 1968.

== Establishment ==
Dominican High School was established in Galveston in 1882.

== Consolidation and closure ==
In the autumn of 1967, the religious orders operating Dominican High School and the two other Galveston Catholic high schools agreed on consolidation as a means of continuing Catholic secondary education in Galveston, offering a broader curriculum than was possible in any of the three smaller high schools. The Apostolic Administrator of the Diocese of Galveston-Houston, Bishop John Morkovsky, S.T.D., approved the plan. He appointed a Board of Trustees composed of laymen and priests to plan and bring about the consolidation in cooperation with the Diocese, the three religious orders, and the Catholic parishes of Galveston County. The Board named the newly created school after the Right Rev. Monsignor Daniel P. O’Connell, P.A., pastor of St. Mary's Cathedral Basilica in Galveston from 1933 until his death in 1966, and a long-time friend of Catholic education.

O’Connell College Preparatory School is now the only Catholic secondary school in Galveston County. O’Connell resulted from the consolidation of three previously existing Catholic Schools in 1968: Dominican High School, Kirwin High School, and Ursuline Academy.
