= Rosenberg Library =

- U.S. National Register of Historic Places
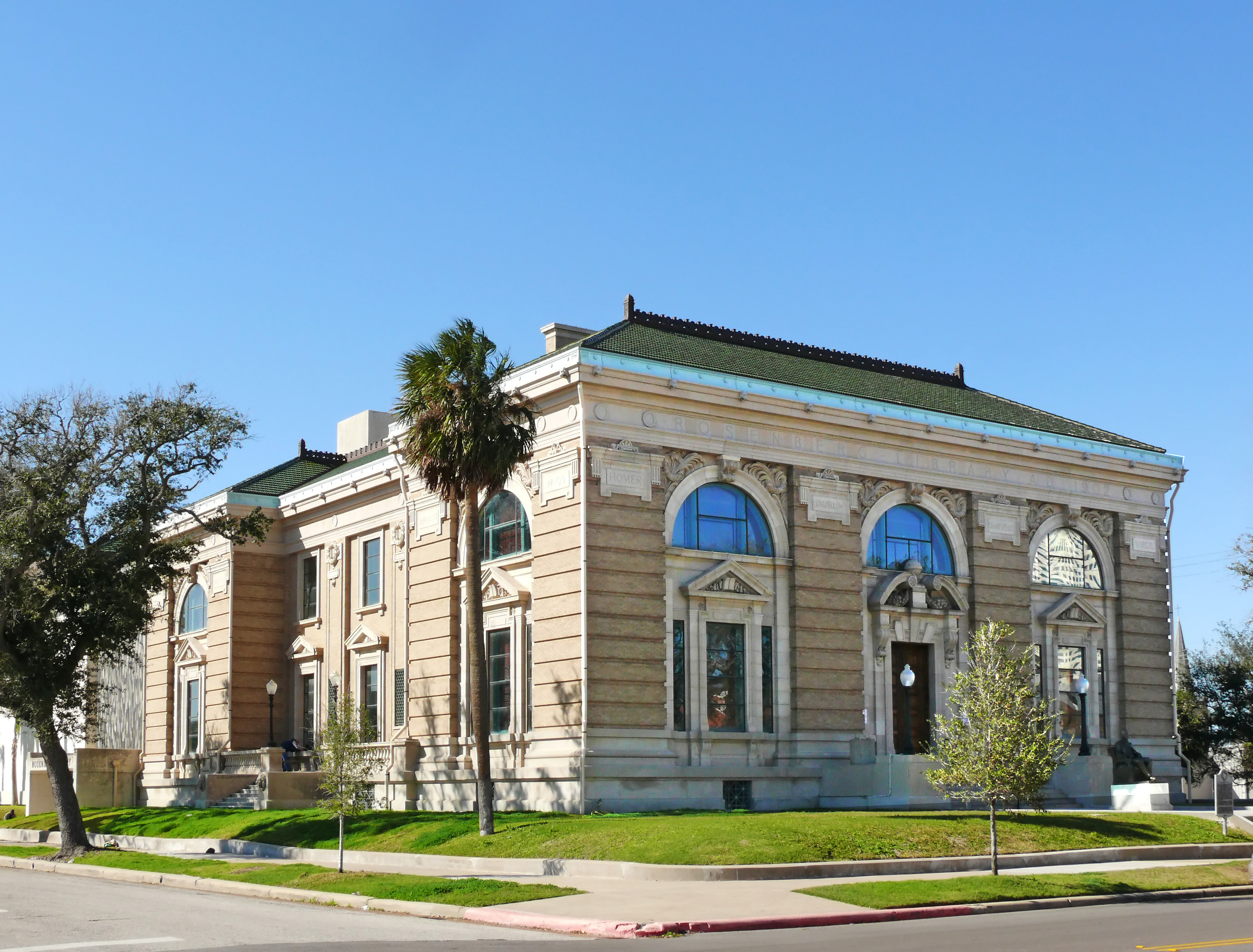
- Rosenberg Library in 2016
- Location: 2310 Sealy St., Galveston, Texas
- Coordinates: 29°18′3″N 94°47′34″W
- Area: less than one acre
- Built: 1902
- Architect: Multiple
- Architectural style: Second Renaissance Revival
- Website: Rosenberg Library
- MPS: Central Business District MRACentral Business District MRA
- NRHP reference No.: 84001722
- Added to NRHP: August 14, 1984

Rosenberg Library, a public library located in Galveston, Texas, United States, is the oldest continuously operating library in Texas. It serves as headquarters of the Galveston County Library System, and its Executive Director is also the Galveston County Librarian.

The library itself is a nonprofit 501(c)(3) organization.

== Architecture ==
The library building was constructed on a concrete foundation with walls made of light-colored brick from the Hydraulic Press Brick Company of St. Louis, Missouri. The walls are further adorned with architectural terracotta trim and detailing, and large panels at the tops of the building's brick piers list the names of thirteen authors: Homer, Virgil, Dante, Shakespeare, Milton, Hugo, Goethe, Schiller, Irving, Byrant, Emerson, and Longfellow. The building's roof is covered with green glazed Ludowici tile.

== History ==
Henry Rosenberg set aside a portion of his estate to establish a library in his name. The 1900 Galveston Hurricane postponed this project. The following year, the trustees of the estate announced a design competition for the library, and Eames & Young of St. Louis submitted the winning proposal. The library was established in 1900, and the building constructed a few years later. In 1905 it absorbed the collection of the defunct Public Library (est. in 1871 as the Galveston Free Library).

=== Segregation ===
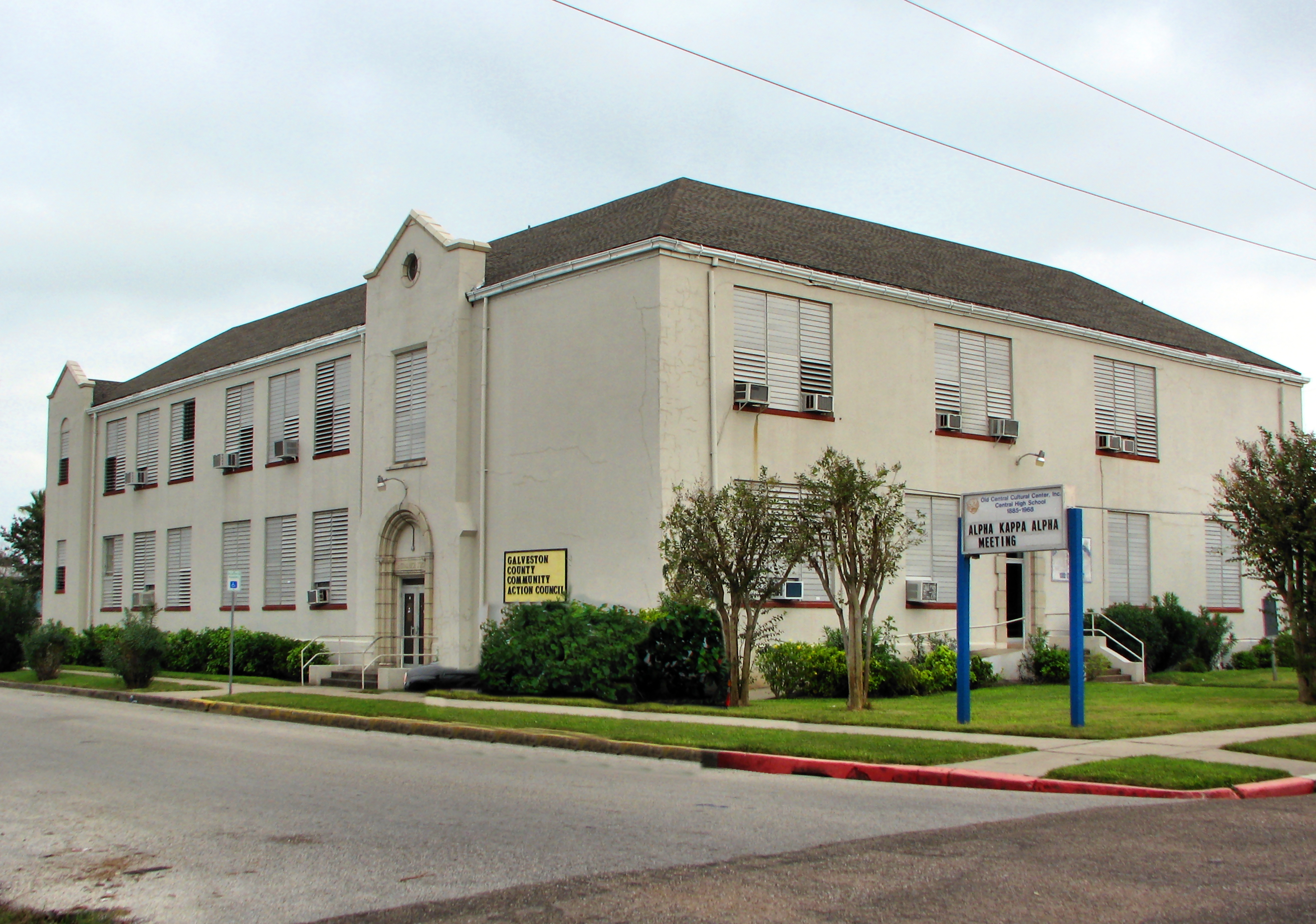
Central High School and the "Colored Branch of the Rosenberg Library"

Like many institutions in the American South, during segregation the library maintained a separate branch for African Americans. This new library, built in 1905, was added to the western wing of Central High School, the city's high school for African Americans.

=== Later history ===
The Rosenberg Library added the Moody Memorial Wing in 1971, doubling the size of the building and re-orienting the entrance to the Sealy Avenue side. The new wing houses the Galveston and Texas History Center. The Rosenberg Fountains were added north of the library in 1995.

== Galveston and Texas History Center ==
The Galveston and Texas History Center collects materials relating to Galveston and early Texas. Major manuscript collections include the papers of Samuel May Williams, Gail Borden, John Grant Tod Jr., and James Morgan; the records of several 19th and early 20th century businesses, including those of I.H. Kempner, Harris Kempner, Henry M. Trueheart, and J. C. League; the records of several organizations and churches in the area; and 20th-century collections reflecting recent events and activities in Galveston and the upper Gulf Coast.

The map collection includes maps and charts of Texas, the Gulf of Mexico, the Caribbean Sea, and adjacent coasts dating from the 16th century to the present. Holdings of the museum department include historical artifacts pertaining to Galveston or early Texas, paintings of Galveston subjects or by local artists including Julius Stockfleth and Boyer Gonzalez, and a sizable collection of Russian and Greek icons. The rare book collection contains incunabula, first editions, and examples of fine printing.

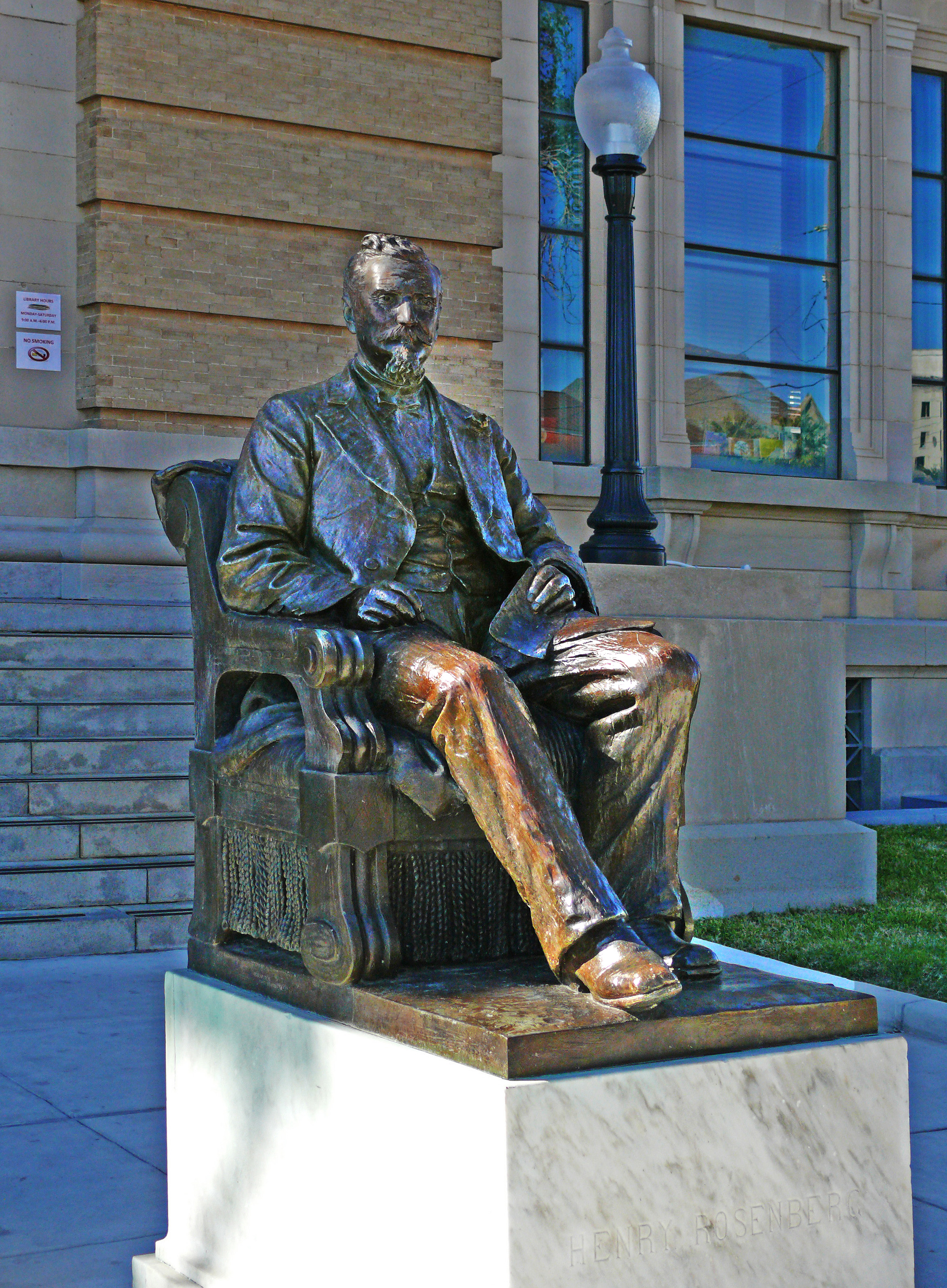
Statue of Henry Rosenberg at the Rosenberg Library

== See also ==
- National Register of Historic Places listings in Galveston County, Texas
- Education in Galveston, Texas
- History of the Jews in Galveston, Texas

== Bibliography ==
- Beasley, Ellen; Fox, Stephen (1996). Galveston Architectural Guidebook. Houston: Rice University Press. ISBN 0-89263-345-X.
- "Historical Sketches of Texas Libraries: Galveston: Rosenberg Library", Handbook of Texas Libraries, Houston: Texas Library Association, 1908, hdl:2027/uc1.b4221835 – via HathiTrust
- Bulletin of the Rosenberg Library, Galveston 1910-
- Betty Wales (1954). "'Through Many Generations'; Rosenberg Library's First 50 Years". Texas Library Journal. 30. Texas Library Association. ISSN 0040-4446.
- Jordan, Mel (1976). "Frank Patten and the Rosenberg Library". East Texas Historical Journal. 14 (2) – via Stephen F. Austin State University.
