= Julius Stockfleth =

German painter

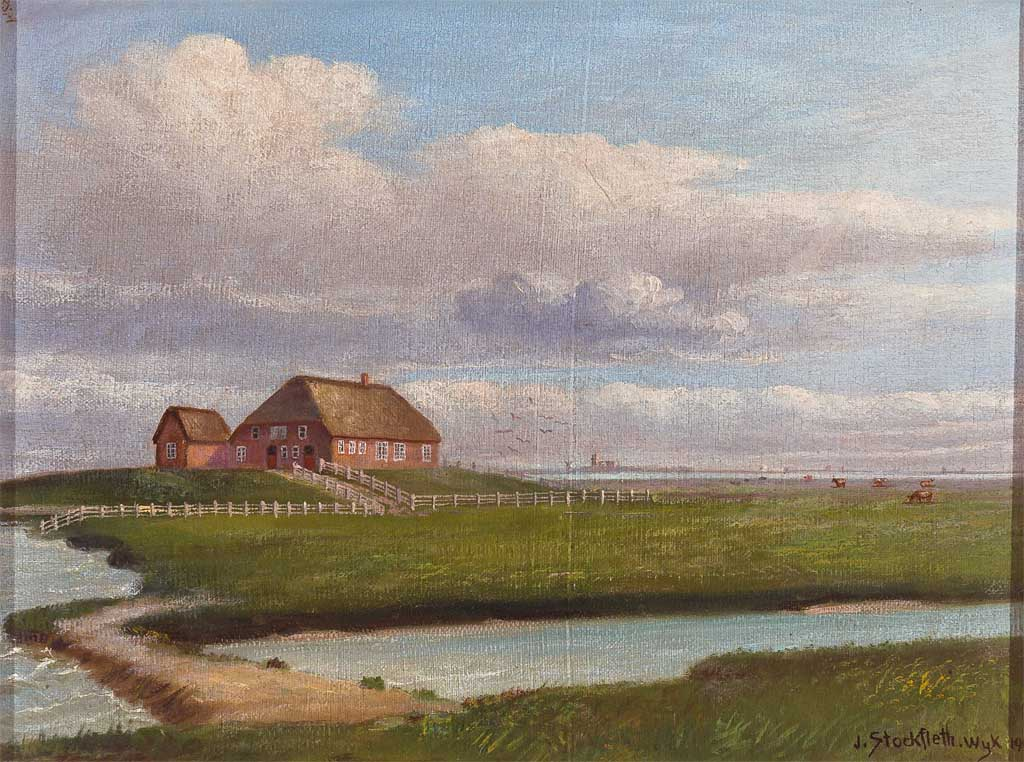
Julius Stockfleth, Hallig Langeness Peterswarf, 1919

Julius Stockfleth (January 29, 1857 – 1935) was a Denmark-born painter of landscapes and marine subjects. His images of the city of Galveston, Texas, constitute a valuable record of the town between 1885 and 1907, especially its devastation by the hurricane of 1900.

== Biography ==
Julius Stockfleth was born in Wyk auf Föhr in the Duchy of Schleswig, Denmark. He was the son of Louise (Hansen) Stockfleth and Friedrich August Stockfleth, a sailor and ship's carpenter. The area where he lived was taken from Denmark in 1864, and eventually became part of the German Empire. After an apprenticeship with a local painter, he emigrated to the United States in 1883, settling in Galveston in 1885.

During the two decades that Stockfleth lived in Galveston, he frequently painted the city's docks, its harbor, and its ships. He found a good market for this work among the ships' crews. The 1900 hurricane killed a dozen members of his extended family, and as a way to cope with the tragedy he undertook a series of paintings that documented the city during the hurricane and its subsequent rebuilding. His are the only known contemporary paintings of the Galveston hurricane. Altogether, Stockfleth left some 100 paintings of Texas subjects painted in a naïve realist style.

He returned to Germany in 1907, living in Wyk until his death and painting local scenes.

Some of his work is in the collection of the Rosenberg Library.
