= Ball High School =

Public school in Texas, United States

Location
- 4115 Avenue O Galveston; Galveston, Texas; United States; 29.2871°N 94.8114°W

Information
- Type: Public High School
- Established: February 15, 1884
- School district: Galveston Independent School District
- Principal: Joseph Pillar
- Teaching staff: 118.60 (FTE)
- Grades: 9–12
- Enrollment: 1,951 (2023-2024)
- Student to teacher ratio: 16.45
- Campus: Urban
- Colors: Purple and Gold
- Mascot: Golden Tornado
- Nickname: Tors
- Website: Ball High Homepage

Ball High School is a public secondary school in Galveston, Texas, United States. Ball, which covers grades 9 through 12, is a part of Galveston Independent School District.

Ball High School serves the cities of Galveston and Jamaica Beach and the unincorporated communities of Port Bolivar and Crystal Beach on the Bolivar Peninsula. The school mascot is the Tornado, named "Tuffy Tor", and the Ball High sports teams are known as the Tors.

== History ==
=== Founding ===
In 1881, the citizens of Galveston, authorized by the legislative act of 1879 which specified that all cities of a certain size could initiate and maintain their own school system, organized a public school district, restricted to "white or caucasian" students and elected a board of trustees. Some 20 teachers were employed to teach students in grades one through seven. Prior to this time, all education in Galveston was private or parochial.

In the summer of 1883, a local dry goods businessman, George Ball, communicated his intention to support the establishment of a public high school in Galveston via a brief and simple note to the Galveston City Council. It read: "If the authorities of this city will furnish appropriate and sufficient grounds centrally located, I will contribute $50,000 for the erection of a building to be permanently dedicated to the use of the public free schools of the City of Galveston...I will be pleased to carry [this proposal] into the earliest effect with the hope that it may prove useful to the community with which I have been long identified and whose future welfare I most earnestly desire."

Ball's offer was accepted, and the cornerstone for what would become Ball High School in Galveston was laid on February 15, 1884. Contrary to custom, which places the cornerstone in the northeast corner of the building, it was placed at the southwest corner of the main portion of the building. It is a block of Dupree stone, upon the open sides of which are carved simply the words, "George Ball to the Children of Galveston." Articles placed in the cornerstone included photos of Mr. and Mrs. George Ball, autographs of the children attending public schools, the city directory, photos of the teachers, and a floor plan of Ball High School.

Ball died on March 11, 1884, without seeing his gift completed.

The new public high school in Galveston opened its doors to 200 pupils on October 1, 1884, with a building consisting of 12 classrooms, two offices and an auditorium, and with the motto "Best school south of St. Louis and west of the Mississippi."

On March 4, 1886, the school was named in memory of its benefactor.

=== Early years ===
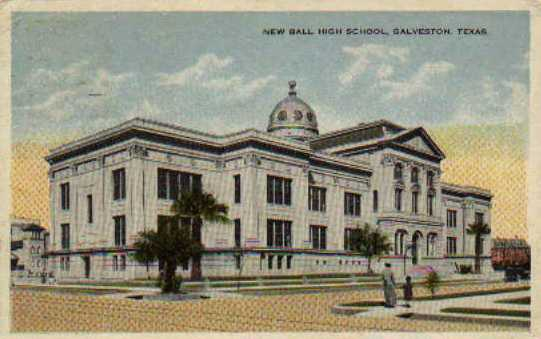
Ball High School after 1890 renovations & additions

The Class of 1887 represented the first graduating class of Ball High School. The school served students in grades eight through twelve. Early curriculum for Ball High School students included English, history, algebra, arithmetic, physical geography, Latin, civil government, trigonometry, physics, political economy, chemistry, mental philosophy and physiology.

In 1890, Mrs. George Ball spent $47,000 to remodel, enlarge and beautify the building, which bore her husband's name. At this time, the Rotunda and Dome were added to the north front of the building.

On October 12, 1894, Ball High provided the opposition in the very first football game played by the Texas A&M Aggies, then known as The Agricultural and Mechanical College of Texas. The Aggies won, 14–6.

In September 1900, the great hurricane struck and Ball High School was not spared from the fury of its waves and wind. The west wall slipped; the roof blew off; plaster crumbled; windowpanes crashed; and the metal covering was stripped from the ball of the dome, showing its skeleton of steel ribs. In the storm's aftermath, citizens of the City of Galveston contributed and raised the $45,000 required to repair the high school and the other Galveston schools and also to pay the teacher's salaries. Because of the devastating loss of life and property during the storm, school attendance decreased by some 25 percent, creating an excess of teachers. Other Texas communities came to the rescue in many ways, perhaps most importantly by providing jobs to these Galveston teachers whose services were no longer needed in the island community.

While Ball High School was undergoing massive repair, students reported to the campus known as the "K" school, today the site of San Jacinto Elementary School.

By the fall of 1901, all classes were again held at the Ball High building. The school population had increased dramatically by 1915, and two wings were added to the building to accommodate the many students. The six new classrooms eased the overcrowding for a time, but by 1924 overcrowding was again a problem for students and faculty.

The wings, added in 1915, were now extended in order to provide additional classroom space. For the next 30 years, no additions or improvements were made to the building on 21st and Ball Avenue. The main Ball High School building, remodeled and expanded still stands today and houses the home offices of the American Indemnity Company.

=== New location ===
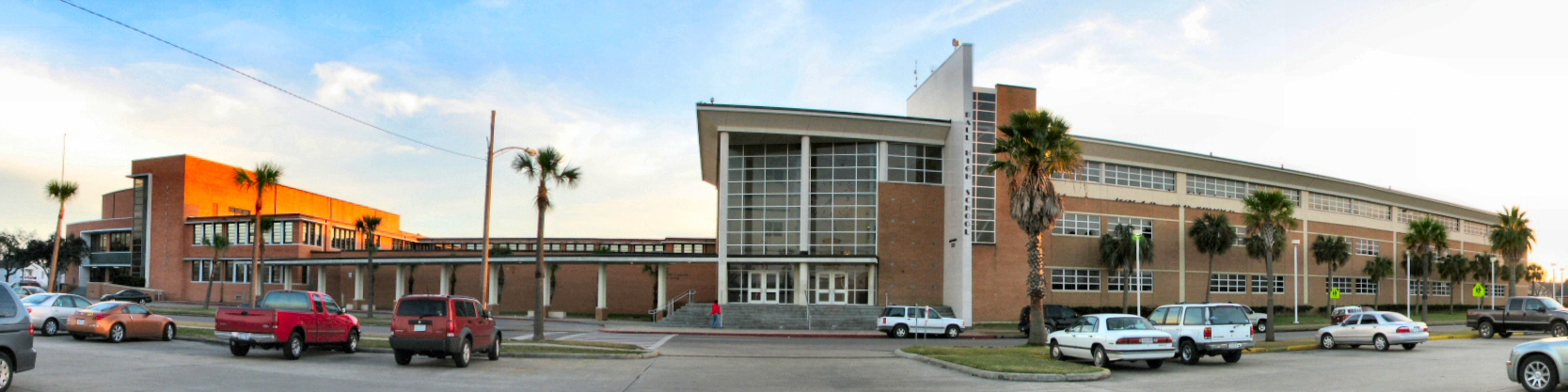
Ball High School Today

Bill Cherry wrote in a 2004 Galveston County Daily News article that, by the 1950s, Ball High School "was not only horribly congested, but the building was in deplorable condition, the victim of years and years of deferred maintenance."

In 1954, the Ball High School complex moved to its new location, constructed in 1952, at 41st street and Avenue O. This building cost $3.2 million and covered a four-square block area-41st to 43rd Streets and Avenue O to Avenue P. The new location received additions and renovations in 1964, 1974, 1981, 1994, 1995, 1996, 2004, and 2005.

In the late 1960s, Ball high merged with Central High School, the first black high school in Texas, founded in 1885. This reorganization created the need for the expansion of the high school into the former Sam Houston Junior High School facility at 4116 Avenue N-1/2, two blocks from the main high school structure, at 4115 Avenue O, to create the two-campus Ball High School. The original campus is often referred to as Ball High South, while the former Sam Houston campus was familiarly known as Ball High North. In the late 1970s, the Central school campus became an eight grade school which served exclusively eighth grade students throughout the school district. Years later, additional remodeling of the South campus combined with reduced enrollments resulted in consolidating the high school at one facility. The North campus reverted to an elementary school, renamed for the late Charles B. Scott, a long-time Ball High School counselor.

In 1968 Central High School, the high school for African-Americans, consolidated into Ball High School. With the closure of Central, Ball High became a very early social experiment for complete school integration and busing. While there were rumblings in the community around the unacceptability of integration, integration worked at Ball High School. Much of the reason for integration's success was due to the success of the integrated athletics teams. Multiple conference and state titles were won during the early seventies and as a result the community rallied behind Ball High School quickly. Leadership on the sports teams was critical to assure that teammates stayed focused on winning and kept the black-white issue completely buried. In the mid-1970s, a state-of-the-art media center was added at Ball High South campus and air-conditioning was installed for the first time. The forty-year-old school received a major $1.5 million renovation and update in 1980. The most recent repairs, in 2004 and 2005, were made possible through school bonds which were in political standstill for seven years.

In the 2000s, rising real estate costs in Galveston forced many families to move to other areas, including League City, Texas City, and La Marque. This meant an exodus of children from the Galveston ISD and into other school districts. If Hurricane Katrina evacuees and out-of-district students are excluded, Galveston ISD lost 12% of its students between the 2002–2003 school year and the 2006–2007 school year; Ball High School is affected as it is the only public high school in Galveston.

== Dress code ==
On September 3, 1969, the GISD superintendent approved a proposed Ball High School dress code that was drafted by a committee consisting of the school principal, the associate principal, students, and faculty members chosen by the students. This committee deliberately allowed an amount of vagueness to balance free expression and the ability to enforce the code. It allowed students to have facial hair while many American high school dress codes at the time did not. This code was in effect in addition to the general GISD dress code, which was issued by the GISD superintendent in March 1967.

The son of Texas senator A. R. "Babe" Schwartz, Richard A. Schwartz, was enrolled at Ball; he challenged the dress code's hair length regulations in court after school officials threatened to expel him if he did not change the length of his hair. In December 1969 attorney David H. Berg, hired by "Babe" Schwartz, filed a Section 1983 to prevent enforcement of the hair length rules. federal judge James Latane Noel Jr. dismissed the lawsuit on the grounds that the plaintiff should have sought state legal remedies first.

== Notable alumni ==
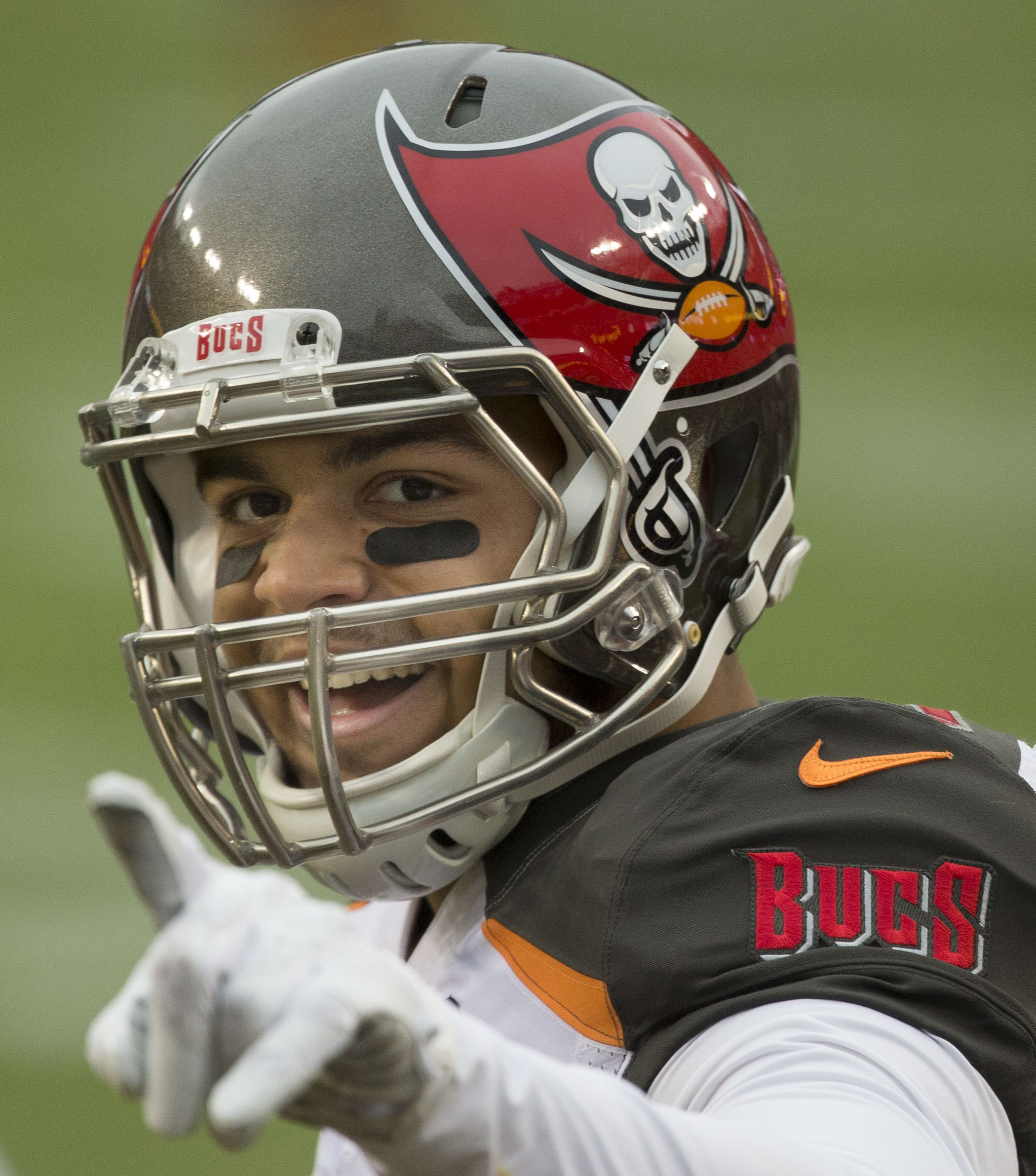
Mike Evans

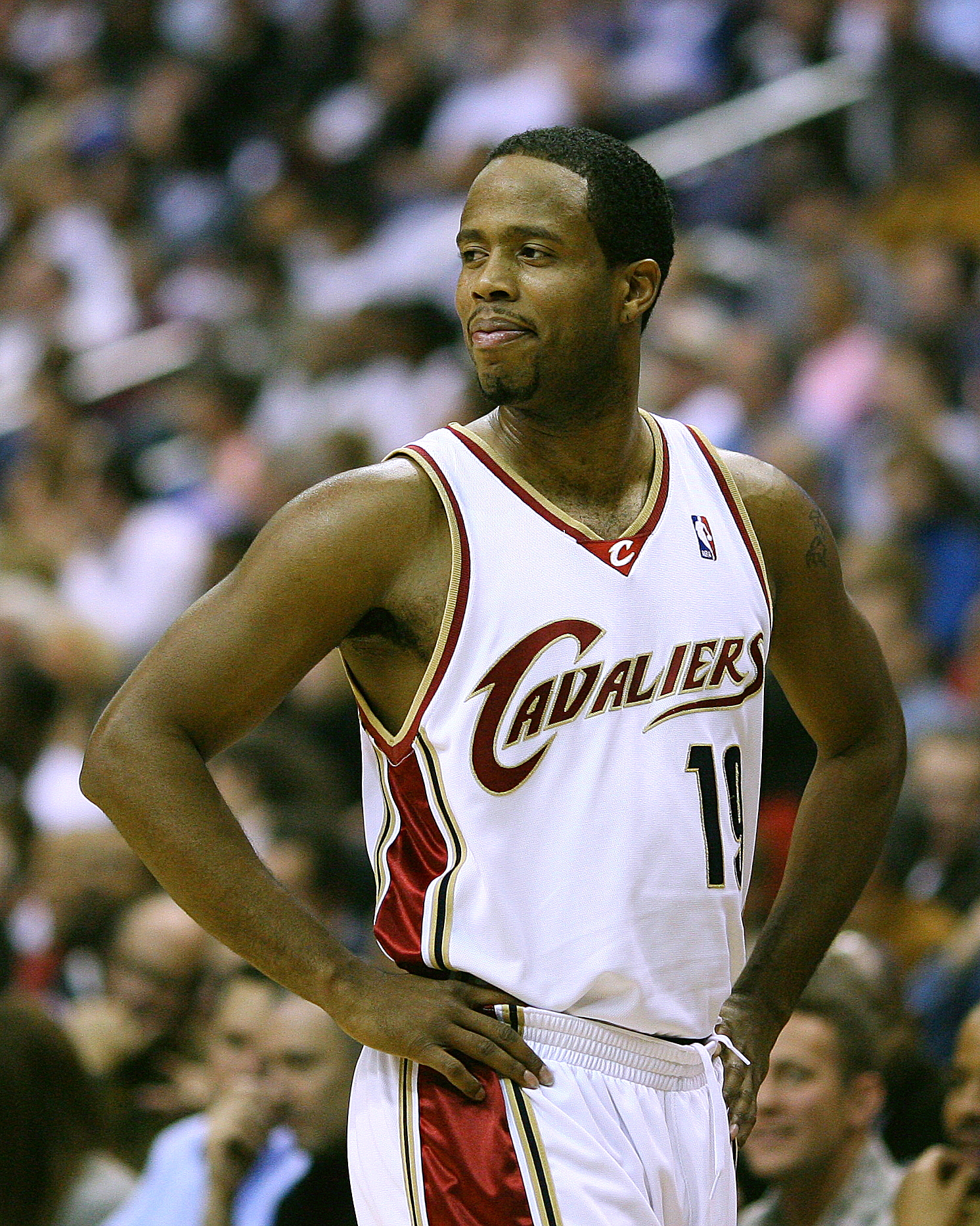
Damon Jones

- Charles Alexander, former NFL running back
- Kimble Anders, former Pro Bowl NFL player
- Brandon Backe, former Major League Baseball player
- Reginald Ballard, film actor
- Patrick Bates, former NFL player (safety)
- Kevin Batiste, former Major League Baseball player
- Vince Courville, football player
- Adrian Devine, former Major League Baseball player
- Tho Bella Dinh-Zarr, former vice-chair of the National Transportation Safety Board
- Mike Evans, NFL player
- Casey Hampton, former Pro Bowl NFL player
- Eric Hill, former NFL player
- Carl Hilton, former NFL player
- Mike Holmes, former NFL player and CFL All-Star
- Emma Hwang, served as an Aquanaut on NASA Extreme Environment Mission Operations 5 (NEEMO 5) crew
- Terry Irving, former NFL player
- Damon Jones, former NBA player
- Tina Knowles, 1972, fashion designer
- Tristin McCollum, NFL player
- Zyon McCollum, NFL player
- George McCullough, NFL player
- Whitney Paul, former NFL player
- Terran Petteway, Nebraska and Israeli Basketball Premier League player
- Anthony Philips, former NFL player
- Derrick Pope, former NFL player
- Billy Stevens, former NFL quarterback
- Jonah Williams, college football safety and baseball outfielder for the Texas Longhorns
- Nick Williams, professional MLB baseball player.
- Robert Williams, former NFL player

Students of Ball High School's Hurricane Story Tellers (Advanced Media Technology Class) are currently in production of a Hurricane Ike documentary entitled IKE: A DOCUMENTARY - The Story of a Torn City Rebuilt by Everyday Heroes. The film is about Galveston residents and businesses post Hurricane Ike, and how they must come together to help rebuild Galveston. The class began to film in October 2008 and is expected to finish in early May 2009. The film contains interviews and footage of Galveston mayor Lyda Ann Thomas.

== Feeder patterns ==
All Galveston ISD elementary and middle schools feed into Ball High School.

== See also ==
- Galveston, Texas
