= 1931 Atlantic hurricane season =

- Season summary map

Seasonal boundaries
- First system formed: June 25, 1931
- Last system dissipated: November 25, 1931

Strongest storm
- Name: "British Honduras"
  - Maximum winds: 130 mph (215 km/h) (1-minute sustained)
  - Lowest pressure: 952 mbar (hPa; 28.11 inHg)

Seasonal statistics
- Total depressions: 13
- Total storms: 13
- Hurricanes: 3
- Major hurricanes (Cat. 3+): 1
- Total fatalities: 2,533
- Total damage: ~ $7.6 million (1931 USD)

Related articles
- 1931 Pacific hurricane season; 1931 Pacific typhoon season; 1930s North Indian Ocean cyclone seasons

The 1931 Atlantic hurricane season was an active hurricane season, with a total of 13 storms recorded, which was the most since 1916. However, only three of them intensified into hurricanes and just one reached major hurricane intensity, which is Category 3 or higher on the modern-day Saffir–Simpson scale. Nine of the tropical cyclones were identified in real-time, while evidence of the existence of four other tropical cyclones was uncovered by the Atlantic hurricane reanalysis project in 2012 and added to the Atlantic hurricane database. Additionally, two of the tropical storms were upgraded to hurricane status as part of the reanalysis.

Overall, the first four tropical cyclones left mostly minor impact on land. In early September, the fifth system caused severe flooding in Puerto Rico, leaving considerable damage to sugarcane crops and causing at least 30 deaths. Just days later, the British Honduras hurricane formed in the Caribbean Sea. (Note: Prior to the beginning of the practice of officially naming tropical cyclones in 1950, tropical cyclones listed in the Atlantic hurricane database are identified by number, while some notable storms are also referred to by nicknames.) The most intense tropical cyclone of the season, it peaked as a Category 4 hurricane with maximum sustained winds of 130 mph (215 km/h). Striking British Honduras, now Belize, at peak intensity, the hurricane caused about 2,500 deaths and about $7.5 million (1931 USD) in damage there. (Note: All damage figures are in 1931 USD, unless otherwise noted) It remains the deadliest hurricane in the history of Belize. The next hurricane caused significant damage in Puerto Rico and resulted in at least two fatalities. The remaining six tropical cyclones left little to no impacts on land.

== Season summary ==
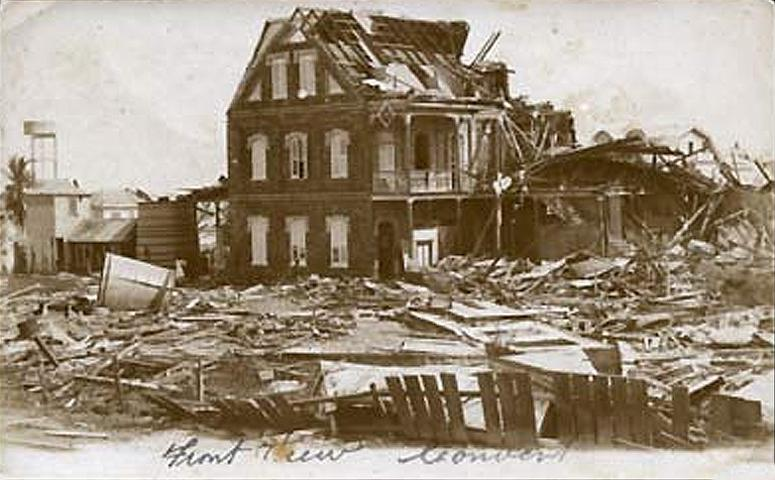
Damage in Belize City due to the British Honduras hurricane

Tropical cyclogenesis began in late June, with a system developing over the western Caribbean Sea on June 24. The storm struck Mexico's Yucatán Peninsula and Texas before dissipating on June 28. In July, a cyclone also developed over the western Caribbean and struck the Yucatan Peninsula and Louisiana. August was slightly more active, featuring two tropical systems. Four cyclones originated in the month of September, including all of the season's three hurricanes. The sixth system, also known as the British Honduras hurricane, developed over the southeastern Caribbean on September 6. It became the most intense cyclone of the season, peaking as a Category 4 hurricane on the modern day Saffir–Simpson scale with maximum sustained winds of 130 mph (215 km/h). The hurricane made landfall in Belize at peak intensity on September 10. In October, two additional cyclones formed, though both remained well under hurricane intensity. The season's final three tropical cyclones developed in the month of November, with the last dissipating near the Bahamas on November 25.

A total of thirteen tropical cyclones developed, the most since 1916, though many remained weak, with only three intensifying into a hurricane. Only one system, the British Honduras hurricane, reached major hurricane status, which is Category 3 or higher on the Saffir–Simpson scale. Most of the storms also impacted land, but few left deaths or inflicted serious damage. Six of the systems made landfall or moved across the Yucatán Peninsula. Overall, the tropical cyclones of the season collectively resulted in $7.6 million in damage and approximately 2,533 deaths, with the vast majority of the destruction being caused by the British Honduras hurricane.

The season's total activity was reflected with an accumulated cyclone energy (ACE) rating of 48, far below the 1931–1943 average of 91.2, even though the season featured the highest number of tropical storms since 1916. In contrast, the previous season had an ACE value of 50, despite having 10 fewer tropical storms than the 1931 season. ACE is a metric used to express the energy used by a tropical cyclone during its lifetime. Therefore, a storm with a longer duration will have high values of ACE. It is only calculated at six-hour increments in which specific tropical and subtropical systems are either at or above sustained wind speeds of 39 mph (63 km/h), which is the threshold for tropical storm intensity. Thus, tropical depressions are not included here.

== Systems ==
=== Tropical Storm One ===
- Tropical storm (SSHWS)
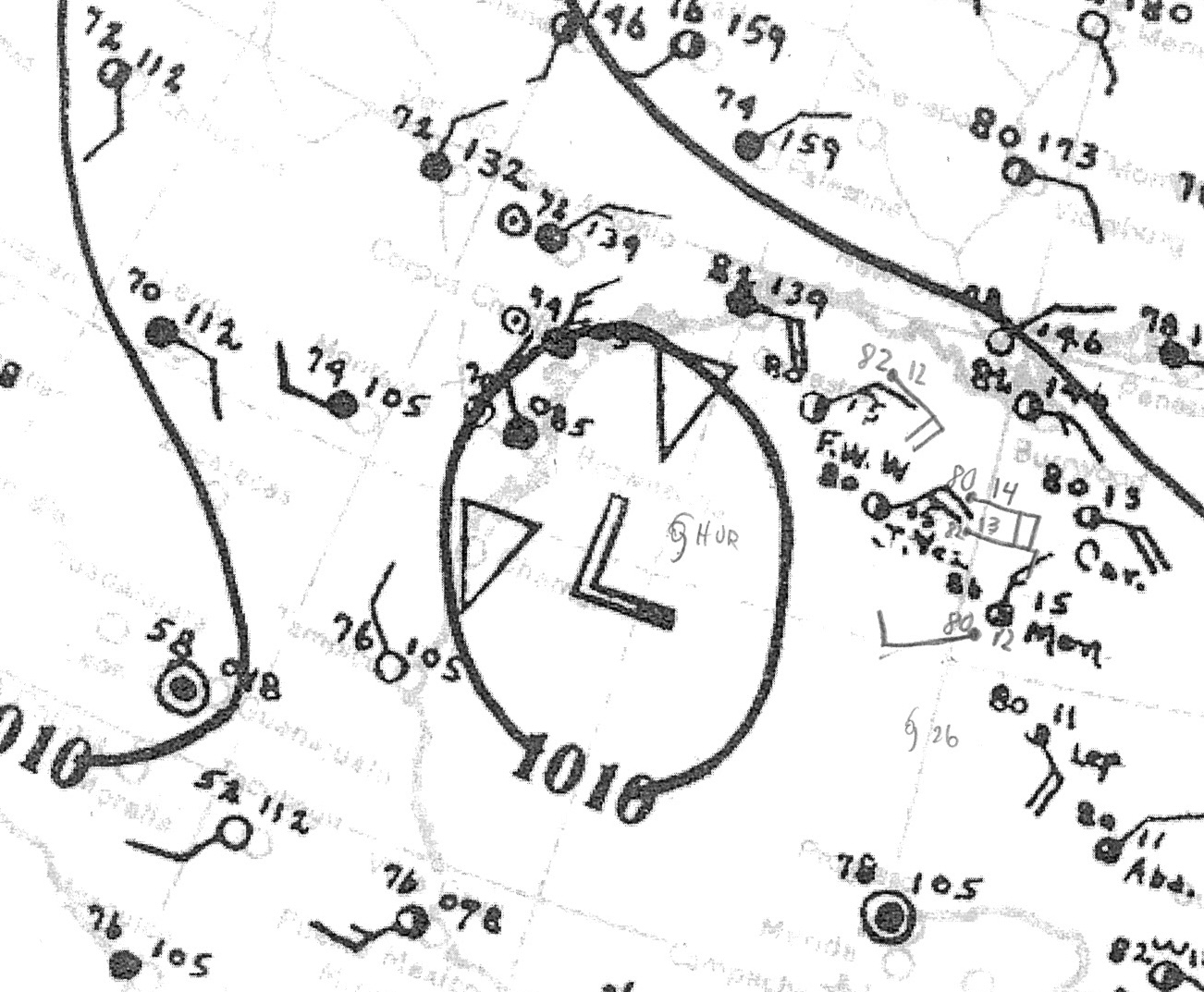
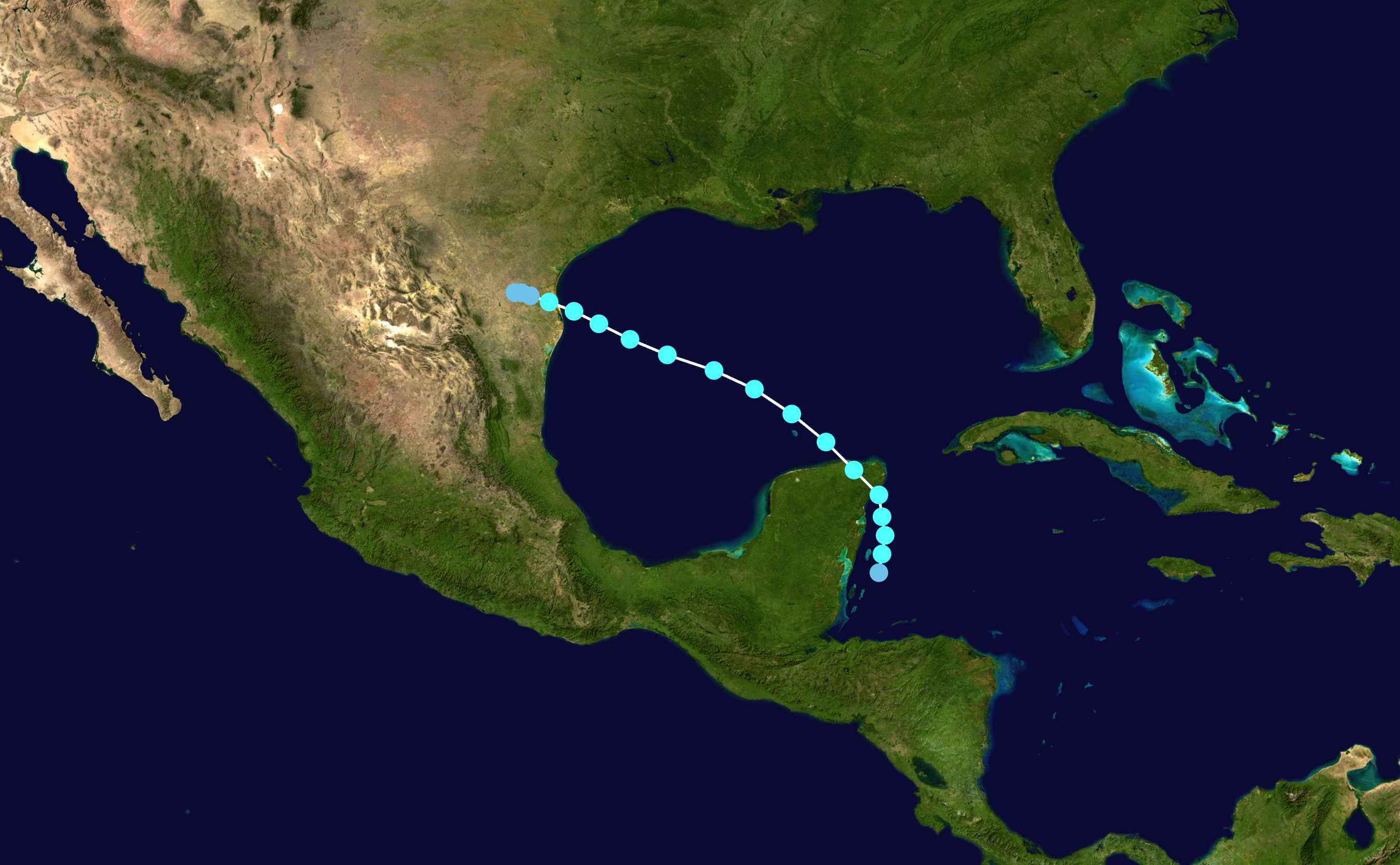
- Duration: June 24 – June 28
- Peak intensity: 50 mph (85 km/h) (1-min); 1002 mbar (hPa)

Around 12:00 UTC on June 24, the season's first tropical cyclone developed just offshore the Yucatán Peninsula. It moved slowly north and intensified into a tropical storm six hours later in accordance with data from a nearby ship. After attaining peak winds of 50 mph (85 km/h) early on June 25, the storm struck the Yucatán Peninsula and subsequently emerged into the Gulf of Mexico. It did not intensify while over water, instead making a second landfall on the southern Texas coast at 22:00 UTC on June 27, with winds of 45 mph (75 km/h). The system weakened to a tropical depression eight hours later, dissipating over southern Texas after 18:00 UTC on June 28.

High tides in Boca Chica Village, Texas, in advance of the storm swept over a highway and bridge. Officials undertook evacuations along the coastline. Localized but significant rainfall fell across South Texas, maximized at 12.6 in (320 mm) in Runno, inundating some streets in Corpus Christi to a depth of 2–3 ft (0.6–0.9 m). Winds there peaked at 39 mph (63 km/h). Rising creeks and rivers throughout Kleburg County inundated the cotton and feed crops, and farther west in Hebbronville, hundreds of acres of land were flooded. Rising water along the Texas Mexican Railway inundated some tracks, delaying trains for several hours.

=== Tropical Storm Two ===
- Tropical storm (SSHWS)
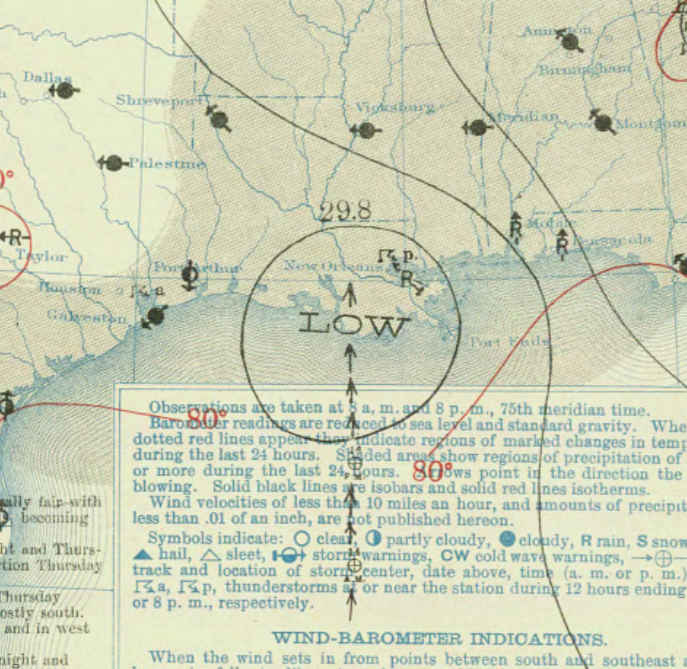
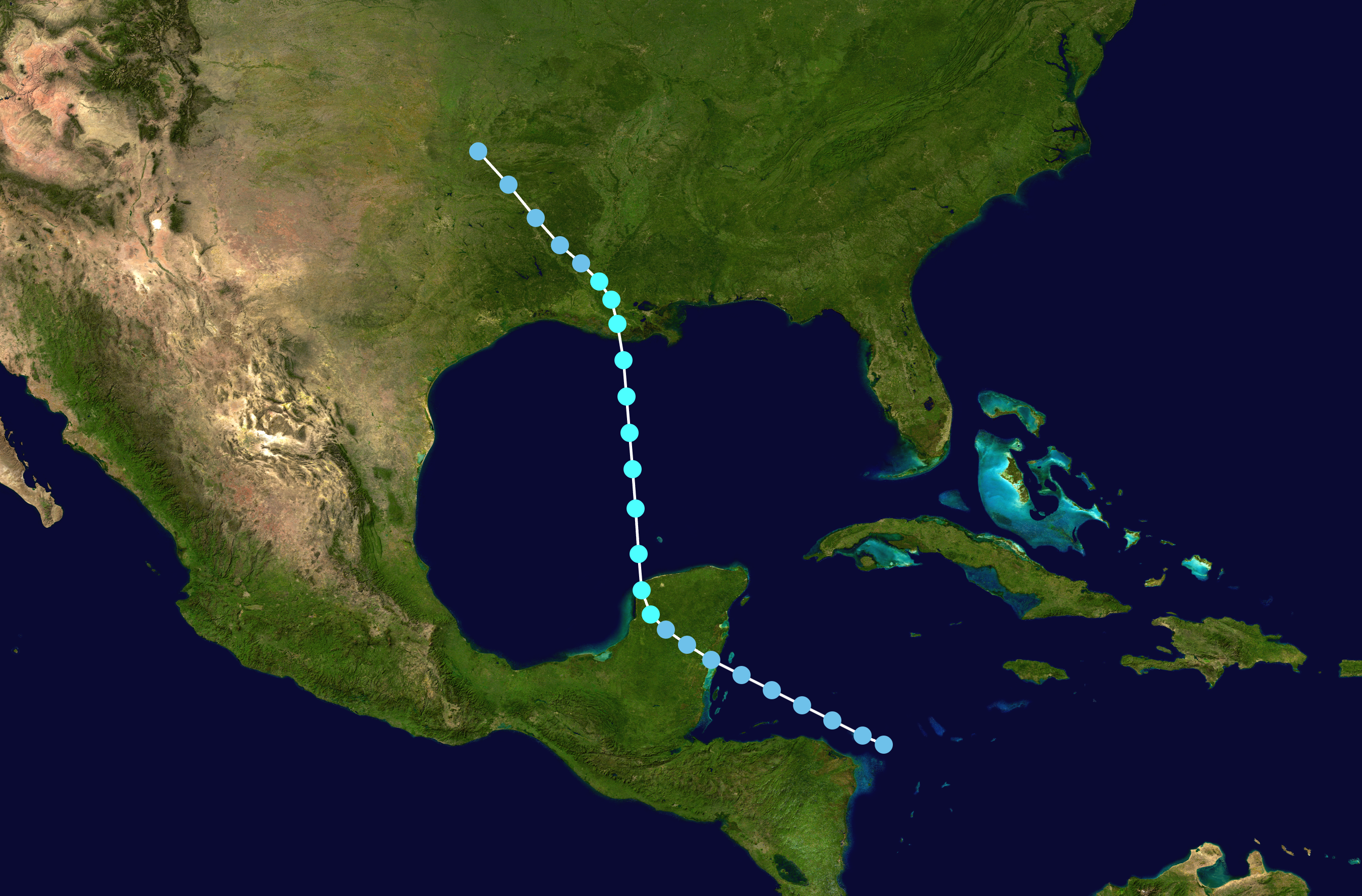
- Duration: July 11 – July 17
- Peak intensity: 70 mph (110 km/h) (1-min); 996 mbar (hPa)

Another tropical depression formed in the western Caribbean around 06:00 UTC on July 11, this time about 75 mi (120 km) northeast of the Honduras–Nicaragua border. It moved west-northwest without development, striking near Chetumal, Quintana Roo, late on July 12 as a tropical depression. As the cyclone progressed across the Yucatán Peninsula, it developed into a tropical storm early the next day as supported by surface observations. The storm banked north once in the Gulf of Mexico and attained peak winds of 70 mph (110 km/h) late on July 14, based on observations from a ship. However, it remains possible that the storm briefly intensified into a hurricane. Some weakening occurred before the system made landfall along the coastline of central Louisiana with winds of 60 mph (95 km/h). The cyclone moved north-northwest, weakening to a tropical depression on July 16 and ultimately dissipating south of Tulsa, Oklahoma, after 06:00 UTC the following morning.

The storm caused marginal damage to the Louisiana coast, snapping some trees and flooding some streets following about 4 in (100 mm) of rain. At Frenier, a small town along the western coast of Lake Pontchartrain, 100 head of cattle were lost to storm surge. The rough surf atop the 6 ft (1.8 m) tide generated along the Mississippi coast damaged some piers and sank several small boats. In the Bay St. Louis area, telephone and telegraph connections were severed by the storm. A boxcar traversing the Illinois Central Railroad at Gulfport was derailed into the sea after part of the track was impacted by storm surge. Further west, the cyclone enhanced the high tide at Caplen, Texas and Gilchrist, Texas, resulting in the evacuation of a hundred people.

=== Tropical Storm Three ===
- Tropical storm (SSHWS)
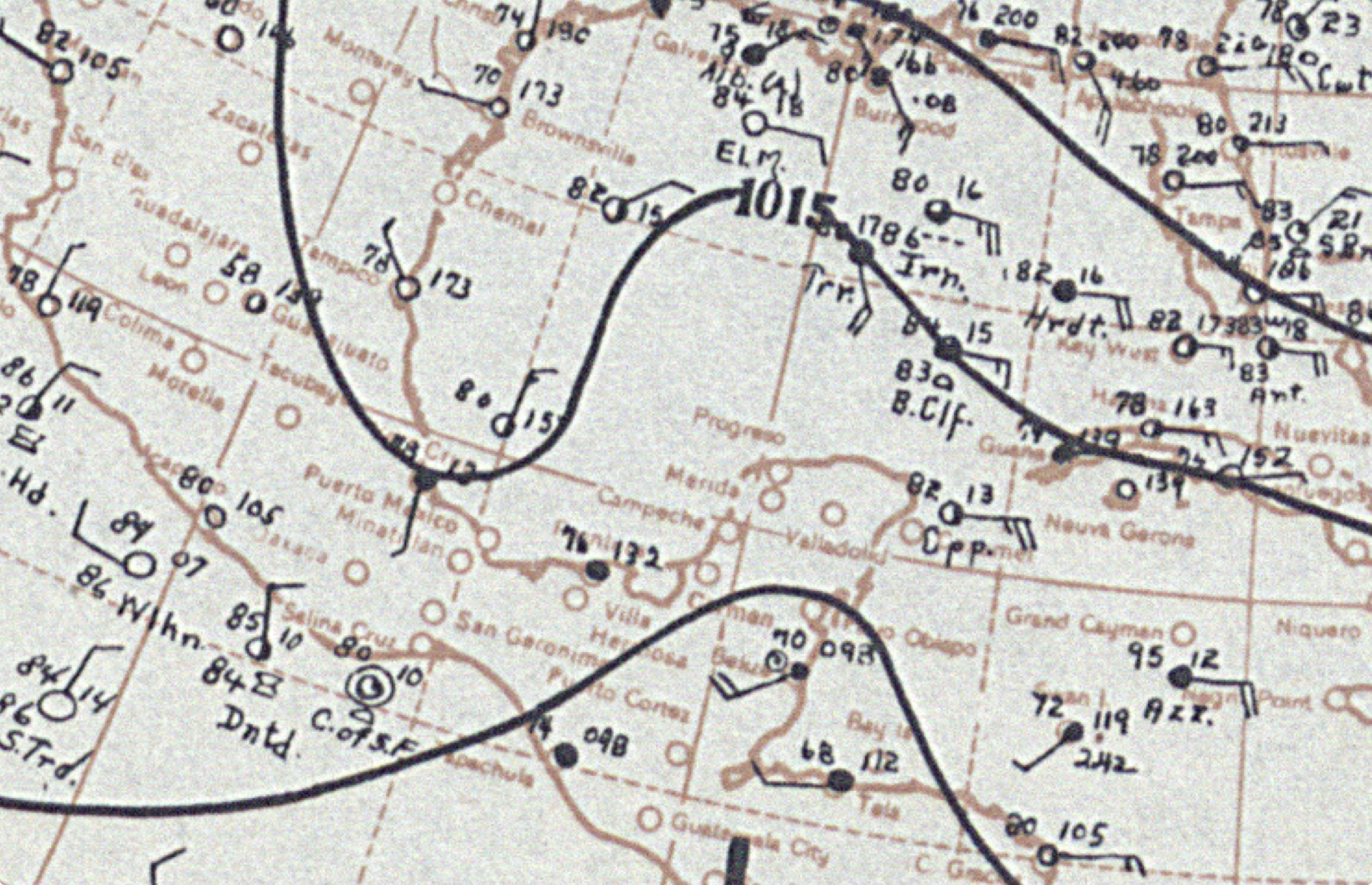
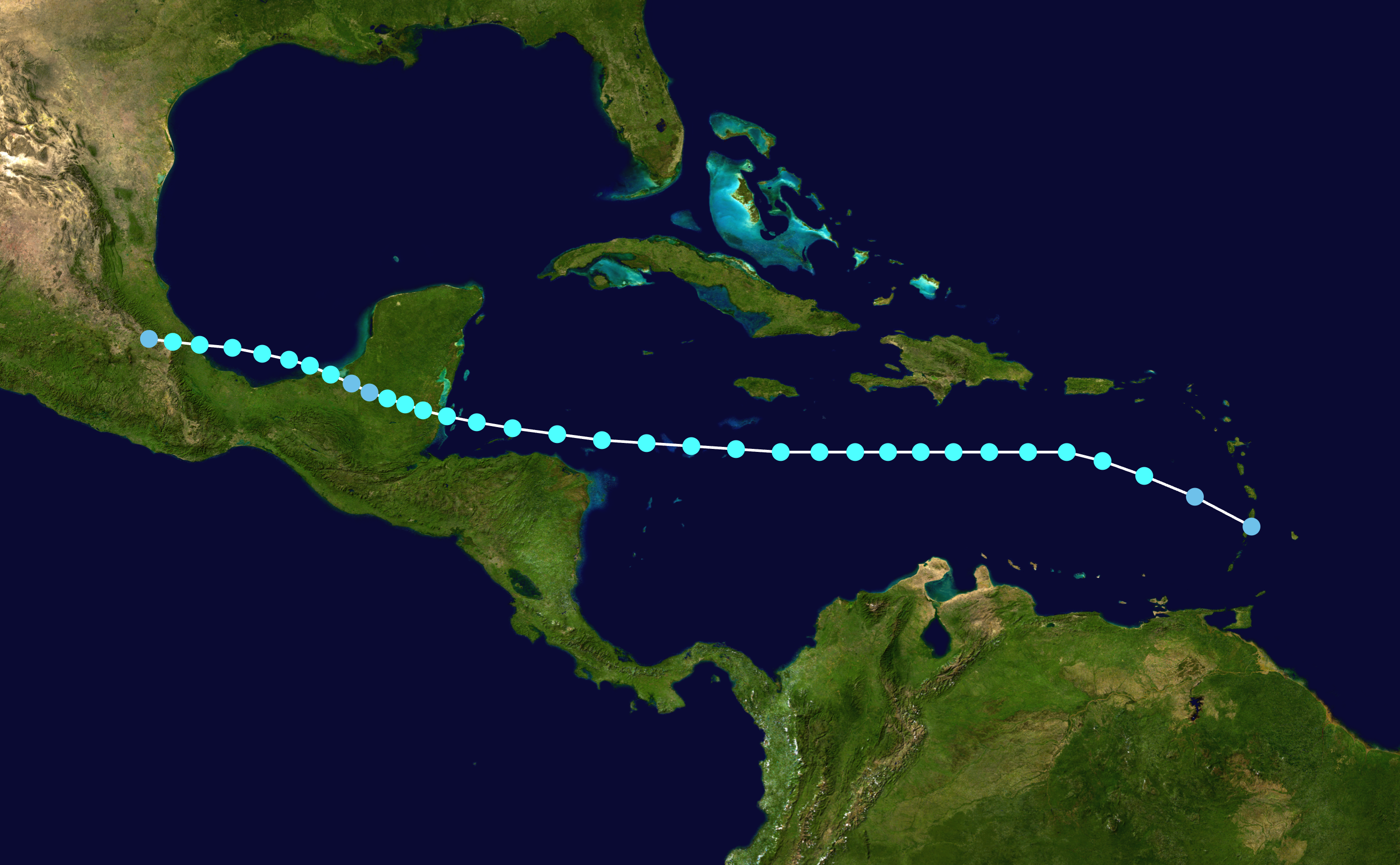
- Duration: August 10 – August 19
- Peak intensity: 60 mph (95 km/h) (1-min); 1002 mbar (hPa)

A tropical depression developed between Saint Vincent and Saint Lucia around 18:00 UTC on August 10. It intensified into a tropical storm twelve hours later. As the cyclone turned to the west from the west-northwest, it continued to intensify, reaching maximum sustained winds of 60 mph (95 km/h) late on August 12. It made landfall a short distance south of Belize City, Belize, around 20:00 UTC on August 15 with slightly weaker winds of 50 mph (85 km/h). While the system fell to tropical depression intensity while over land, it intensified into a tropical storm over the Bay of Campeche early on August 17, regaining peak strength as it made landfall north of Veracruz, Veracruz, just after 12:00 UTC on August 18. The cyclone quickly weakened once inland and dissipated after 00:00 UTC on August 19.

While land stations in Mexico did not observe gale force winds, the Honduran steamship Morazan recorded sustained winds of 46 mph (74 km/h) while stationed at the harbor in Frontera, Tabasco. After the cyclone emerged into the Gulf of Mexico, several ports in the state of Veracruz closed to boat traffic in anticipation of the storm.

=== Tropical Storm Four ===
- Tropical storm (SSHWS)
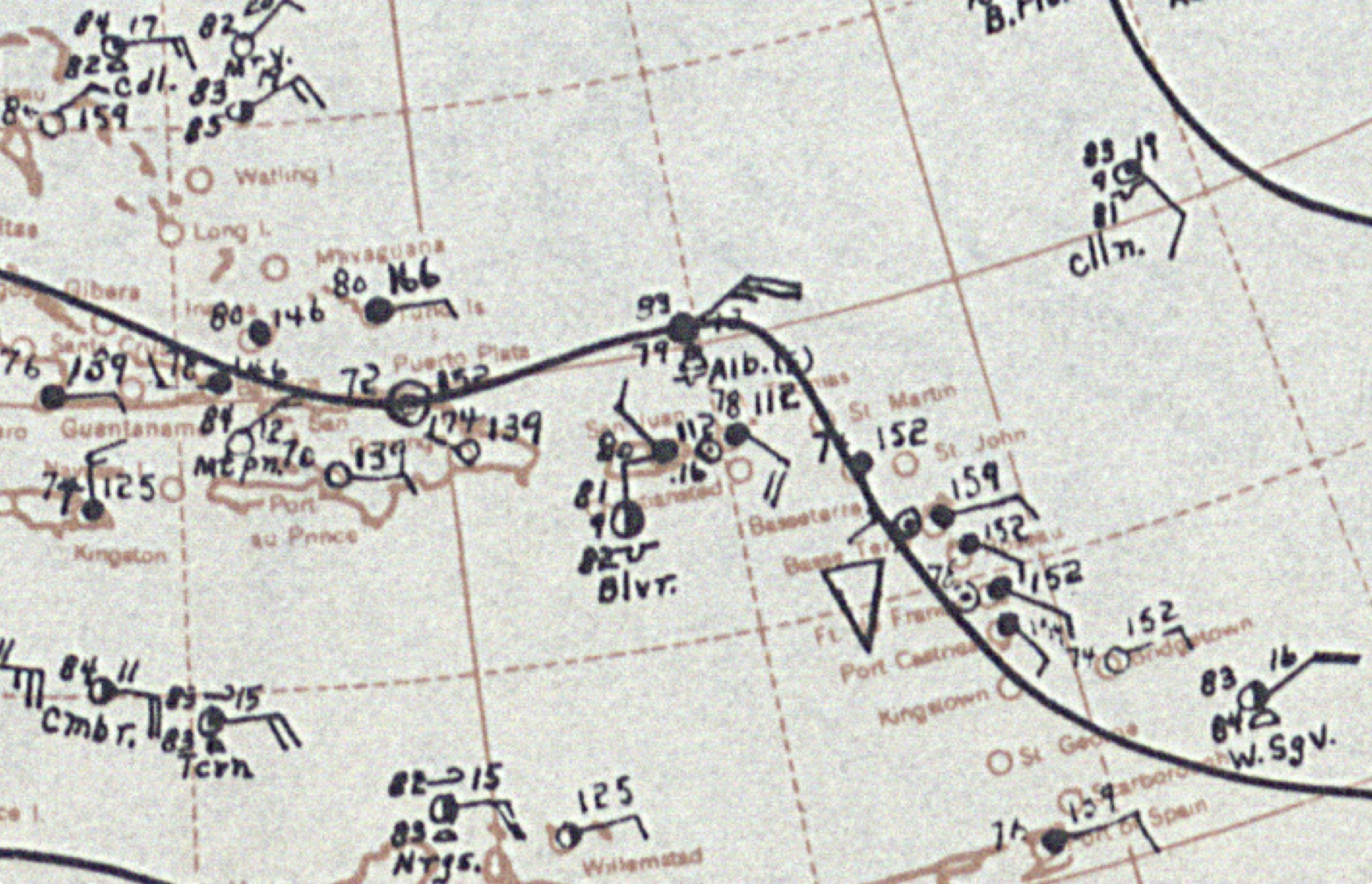
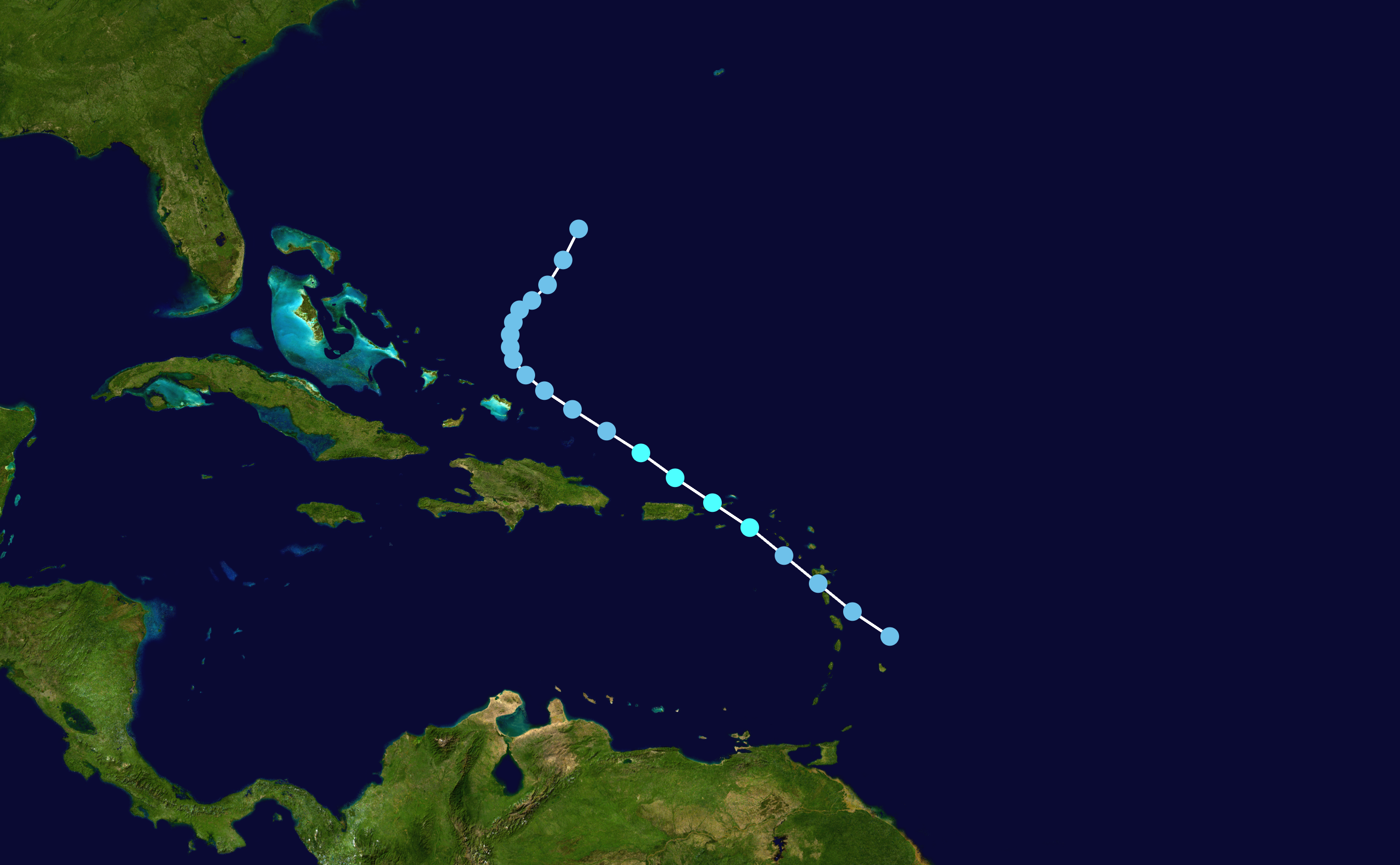
- Duration: August 16 – August 21
- Peak intensity: 40 mph (65 km/h) (1-min);

A tropical depression developed about 70 miles (110 km) north of Barbados around 06:00 UTC on August 16. It moved northwest through the Leeward Islands over the next few hours. While officially recognized as a tropical storm beginning at 06:00 UTC the next morning, there are no conclusive indications that the system ever attained winds of 40 mph (65 km/h); the lack of substantive evidence simply prevented a downgrade during the Atlantic hurricane reanalysis project. Nevertheless, the weak cyclone progressed through the U.S. Virgin Islands and into the southwestern Atlantic, where it fell to tropical depression intensity early on August 18. The cyclone curved to the north-northeast and dissipated after 06:00 UTC on August 21.

A station at the Dominica Botanical Gardens in Roseau, Dominica, recorded 5.4 in (140 mm) of rainfall, accompanied by gusty, albeit non-damaging winds. The storm generated abnormally high tides in New Jersey. At Atlantic City, about 150 people were caught in the undertows, with 1 death occurring, 4 others suffering serious injuries, and 1 person missing.

=== Tropical Storm Five ===
- Tropical storm (SSHWS)
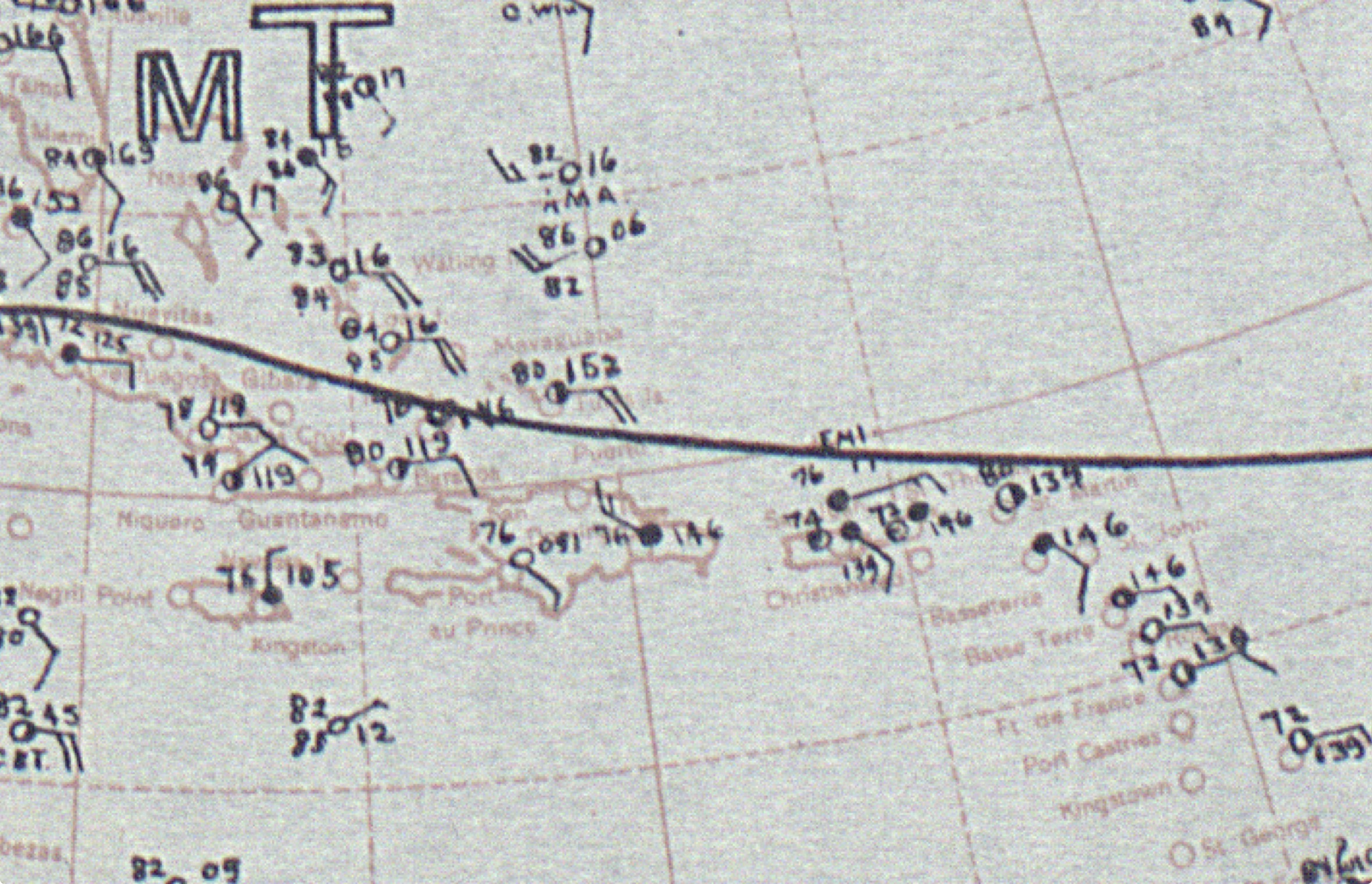
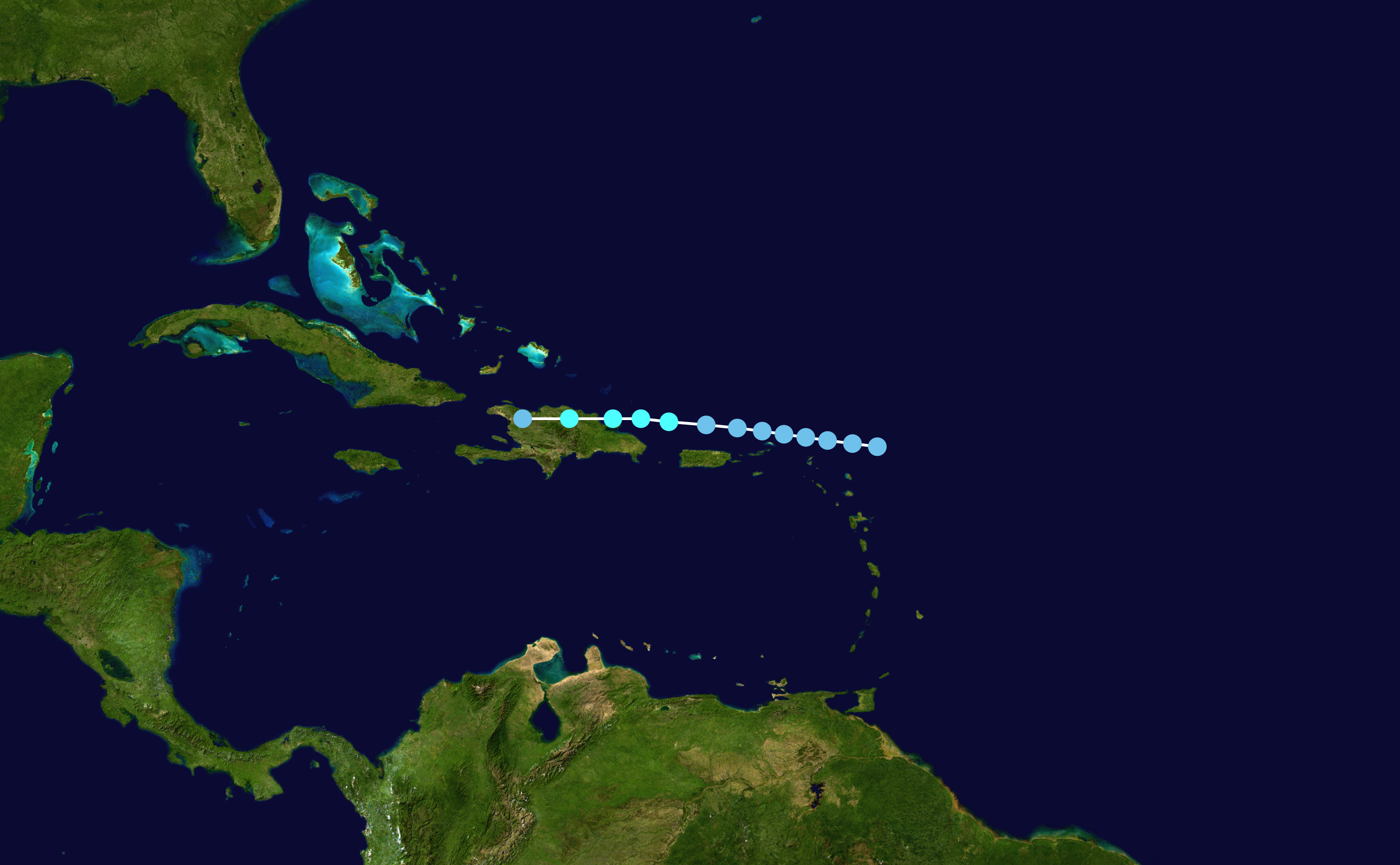
- Duration: September 1 – September 4
- Peak intensity: 45 mph (75 km/h) (1-min); 1007 mbar (hPa)

As part of the Atlantic hurricane reanalysis project, a previously unidentified tropical cyclone was found to have developed just north of the Leeward Islands by 00:00 UTC on September 1, although this could have occurred sooner. It moved nearly due west throughout its lifespan, intensifying to a tropical storm early on September 3 and making landfall along the coastline of northeastern Hispaniola around 14:00 UTC that day with winds of 45 mph (75 km/h). Weakening ensued over the island, and the system degenerated into an open trough after 00:00 UTC on September 4. The remnants of the cyclone were later absorbed by a frontal system off the U.S. East Coast after September 9.

Downpours associated with the system caused a flood disaster in Puerto Rico. According to reports, up to 3.28 in (83.3 mm) in 24 hours caused many rivers to overflow their banks. The normally dry Portugués River was transformed into a torrent of water that carried many small houses and huts downstream, crashing them into a bridge leading to the harbor front in Ponce. There, 90 houses were destroyed and an additional 120 were damaged; this included the Residencia Jacobo Cabassa, considered one of the finest buildings on the island. The flood, in conjunction with landslides, caused significant damage to roads and bridges. Adjacent to Ponce, the Río Inabón caused damage to warehouses. Considerable loss was imposed upon the growing sugarcane crop in Puerto Rico's valleys. Initial reports feared up to 200 people were killed. In the immediate wake of the storm, 30 bodies were recovered, though swollen rivers prevented access to hard-hit locations and that number was expected to increase. Governor Theodore Roosevelt Jr. ordered all government departments to assist in search and rescue, while the Red Cross cared for 250 homeless in Ponce.

=== Hurricane Six ===
- Category 4 hurricane (SSHWS)
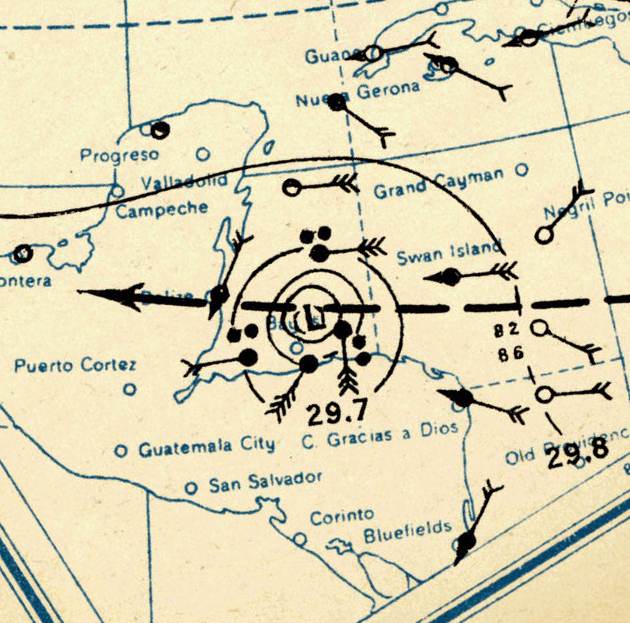
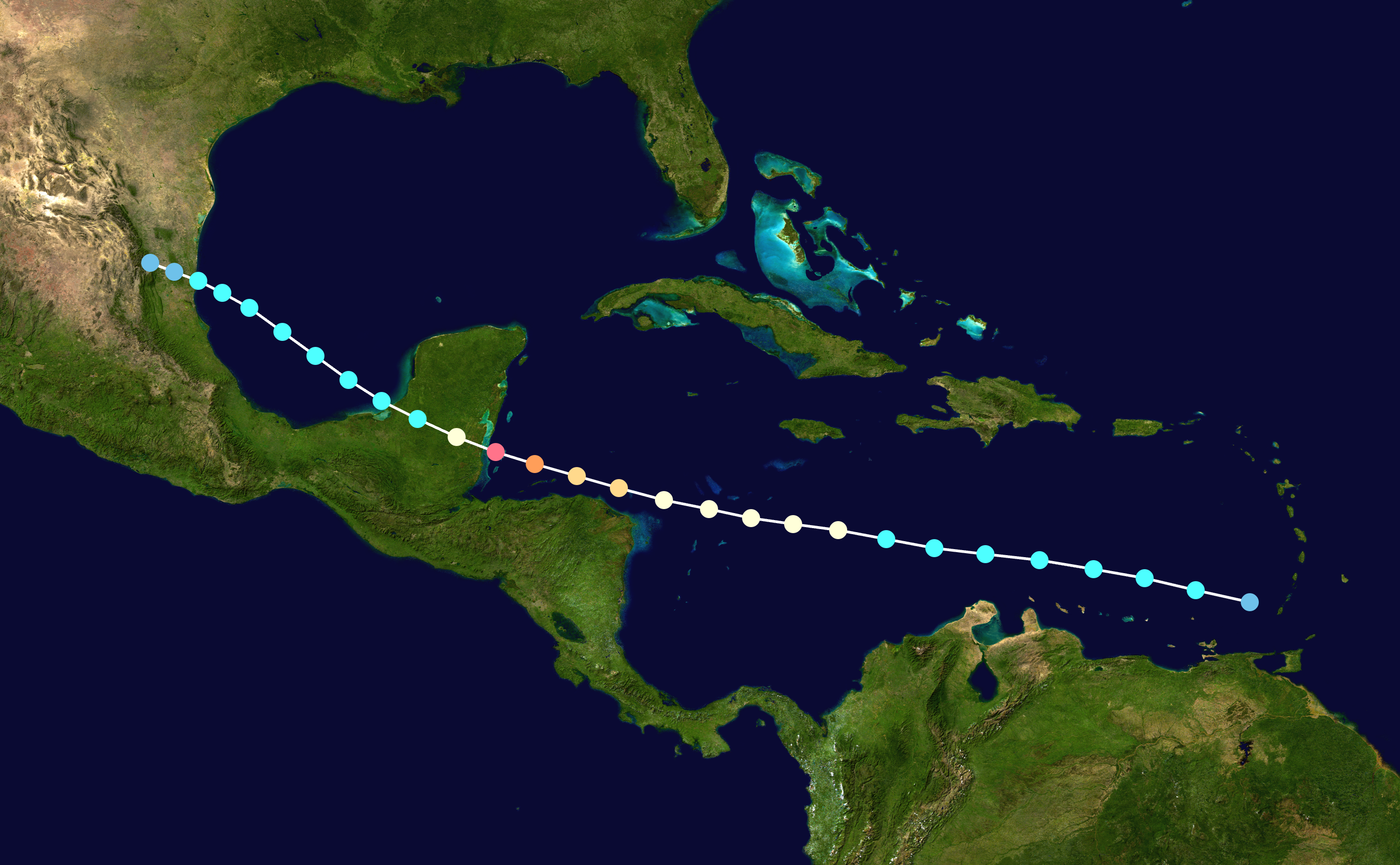
- Duration: September 6 – September 12
- Peak intensity: 130 mph (215 km/h) (1-min); 952 mbar (hPa)

A tropical wave emerged from Africa on August 28. The wave may have developed into a tropical cyclone over the eastern Atlantic at the end of August, though evidence is inconclusive. Given the absence of abundant evidence beforehand, a tropical depression is assessed to have developed about 65 miles (100 km) west of Grenada by 18:00 UTC on September 6. The system moved west-northwest through the Caribbean, becoming a tropical storm six hours after formation and a hurricane late on September 8. Still intensifying, it reached peak strength as a Category 4 hurricane with winds of 130 mph (215 km/h) before making a devastating landfall around Belize City, Belize, at 20:00 UTC on September 10. It fell to tropical storm intensity before crossing the Bay of Campeche, where its exact intensity is unknown given sparse data. The system ultimately made landfall north of Tampico, Tamaulipas, early on September 13 as a minimal tropical storm. It weakened to a tropical depression shortly after moving inland and dissipated after 12:00 UTC that day.

The approach of the hurricane in Belize coincided with celebrations for the Battle of St. George's Caye. Local residents gathered in the street and were apathetic to the cyclone, both because warnings from U.S. ships in the region may have been withheld, and because residents believed local reefs would stunt the impact of any approaching storm. St. George's Caye was reportedly left in ruin. Upon landfall on the mainland, the system delivered winds up to 132 mph (212 km/h) and a large storm surge in Belize City, inundating streets to a depth of 5–9 ft (2–3 m). Seventy percent of the city was destroyed, including all properties on six streets being completely washed away. All agricultural plantations within the vicinity of Belize City, as well as along the Belize River, were razed. The mouth of the Belize River was obstructed by the wreckage of numerous small boats, including six schooners and a 200 t (200,000 kg) dredge. Overall, damage throughout Belize was estimated at $7.5 million. The storm killed approximately 2,500 people, signifying the deadliest hurricane on record in Belize and one of the deadliest on record in the Atlantic basin.

=== Hurricane Seven ===
- Category 2 hurricane (SSHWS)
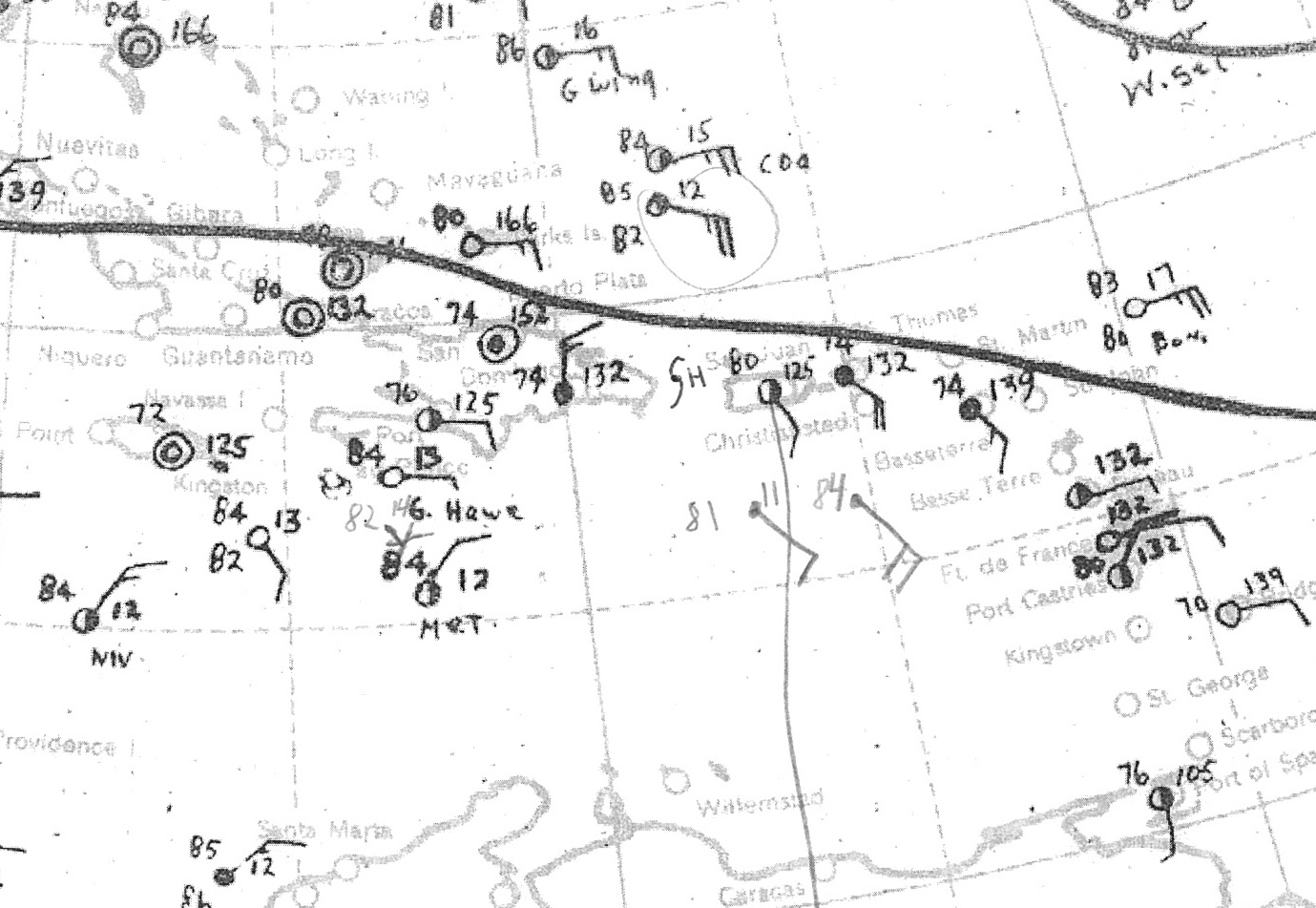
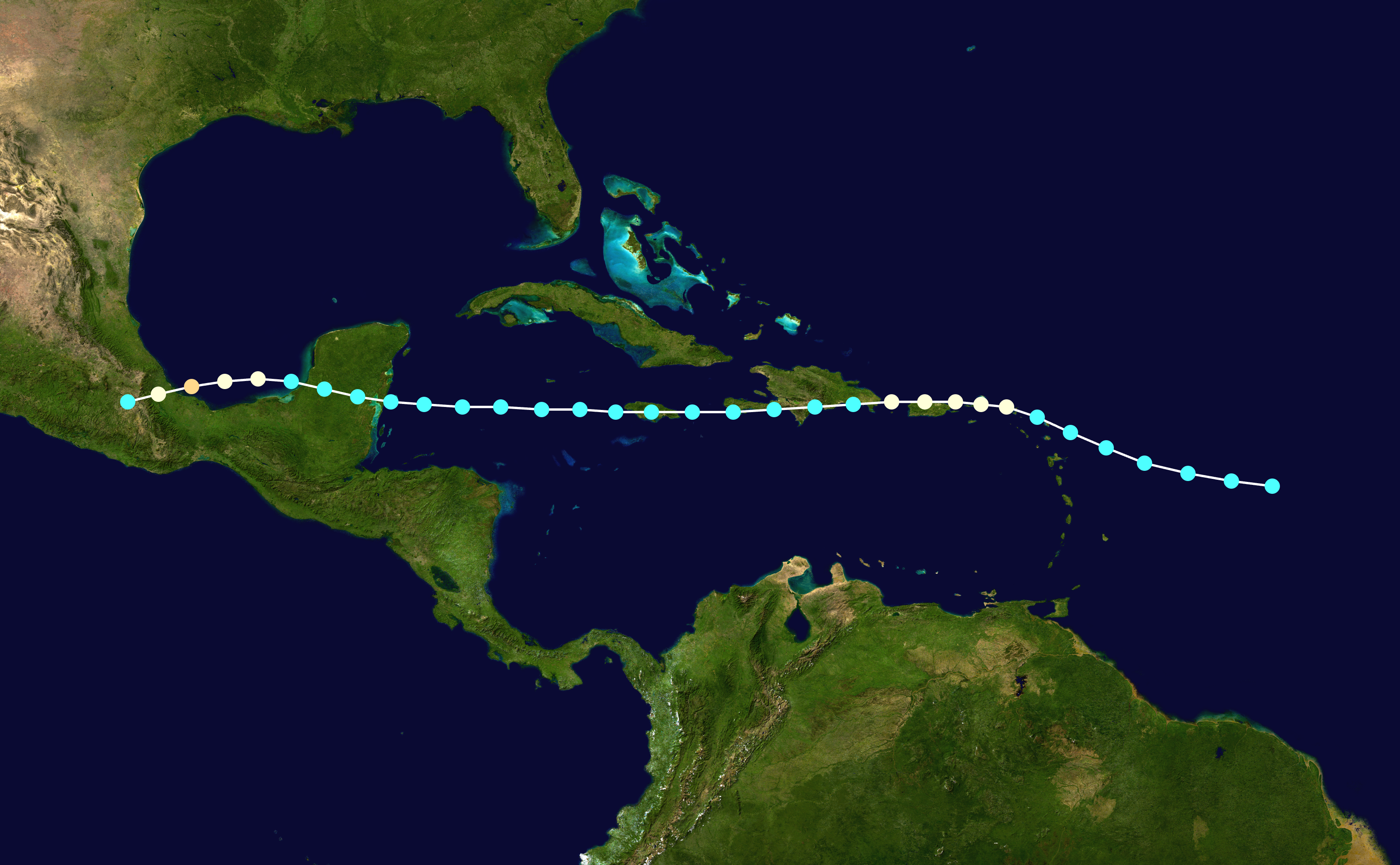
- Duration: September 8 – September 16
- Peak intensity: 100 mph (155 km/h) (1-min); 987 mbar (hPa)

A tropical storm was first noted about 455 miles (730 km) northeast of Barbados around 18:00 UTC on September 8. It intensified on a west-northwest course, becoming a hurricane early on September 10 prior to moving through the U.S. Virgin Islands. The hurricane continued into Puerto Rico – making landfall on the north coast of the island on September 11 – defying initial projections that it would pass safely north. Early on September 12, the storm struck near Punta Cana, Dominican Republic as a minimal hurricane. The cyclone weakened to a tropical storm as it moved south of due west across Haiti, Jamaica, and the western Caribbean. At 19:00 UTC on September 14, it made another landfall north of Belize's border with the Yucatán Peninsula as a strong tropical storm. The cyclone emerged into the Bay of Campeche and quickly strengthened to its peak as a Category 2 hurricane with maximum sustained winds of 100 mph (160 km/h), making a final landfall just east of Veracruz, Veracruz, at 06:00 UTC on September 16 at that intensity. It rapidly weakened once inland and dissipated after 18:00 UTC.

As the system traversed the Caribbean Islands, it produced maximum winds of 60 mph (97 km/h) on St. Thomas. Due to its small stature, damage in Puerto Rico was mainly confined to the San Juan district, and in fact, many residents across the island were unaware a hurricane had occurred. A total of 200 homes were unroofed in the hardest-hit areas, and flooding from the previous disaster just days earlier was exacerbated. The home of the governor sustained water damage. Fruit, coffee, grapefruit, and coconut districts were most severely impacted, though the coffee suffered only minor losses. At least two people were killed. In the immediate wake of the storm, motorcycle police reported a number of people drowned, but no concrete figure was given. Along the coastline, small craft were pushed onshore. The Spanish training ship Juan Sebastián de Elcano dumped 2,500 cases of garlic into the San Juan Harbor and suffered two small holes through her plates after being battered by the storm. The steamer Cerrito was swept onto a reef as well. Two people were hurt in vessels along the coast, including one who sustained a broken ship while being knocked into a ship's railing. Eight people were injured in total, including the head of the Weather Bureau who fell from an anemometer tower during a lull in the cyclone. Communication lines were severed across Puerto Rico. In the neighboring Dominican Republic, Pan-American Airways reported that the Santo Domingo power plant was disabled. In Mexico, the strongest wind speed recorded during the storm's first landfall was 51 mph (82 km/h) at Chetumal, Quintana Roo. The city of Veracruz observed winds of 95 mph (153 km/h). The hurricane unroofed many homes and toppled a number of trees, while warehouses and docks were demolished. Numerous ships sank in the Veracruz harbor. Damage in the city exceeded $100,000. Strong winds knocked out communications at Alvarado and Boca del Río.

=== Hurricane Eight ===
- Category 1 hurricane (SSHWS)
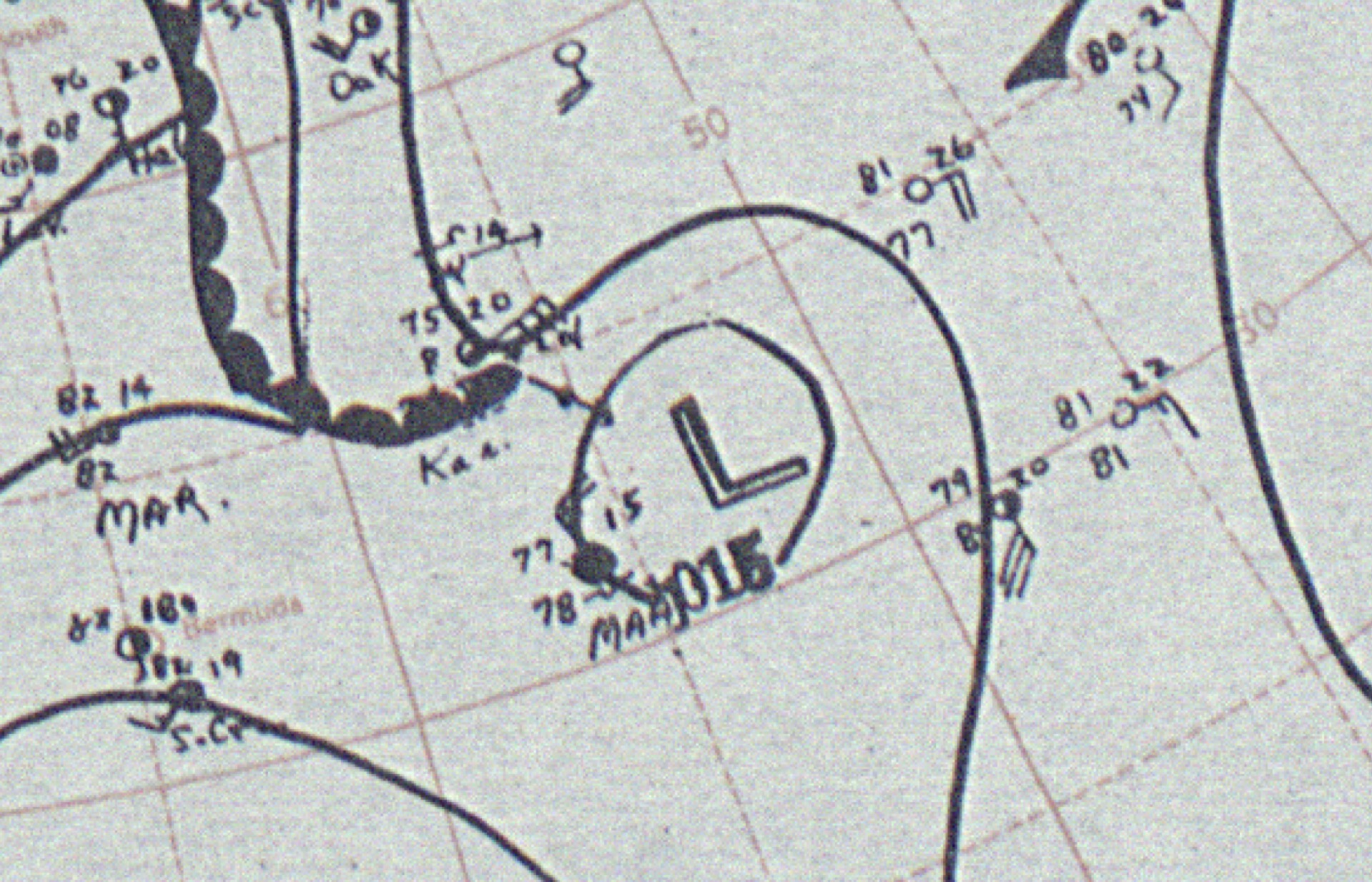
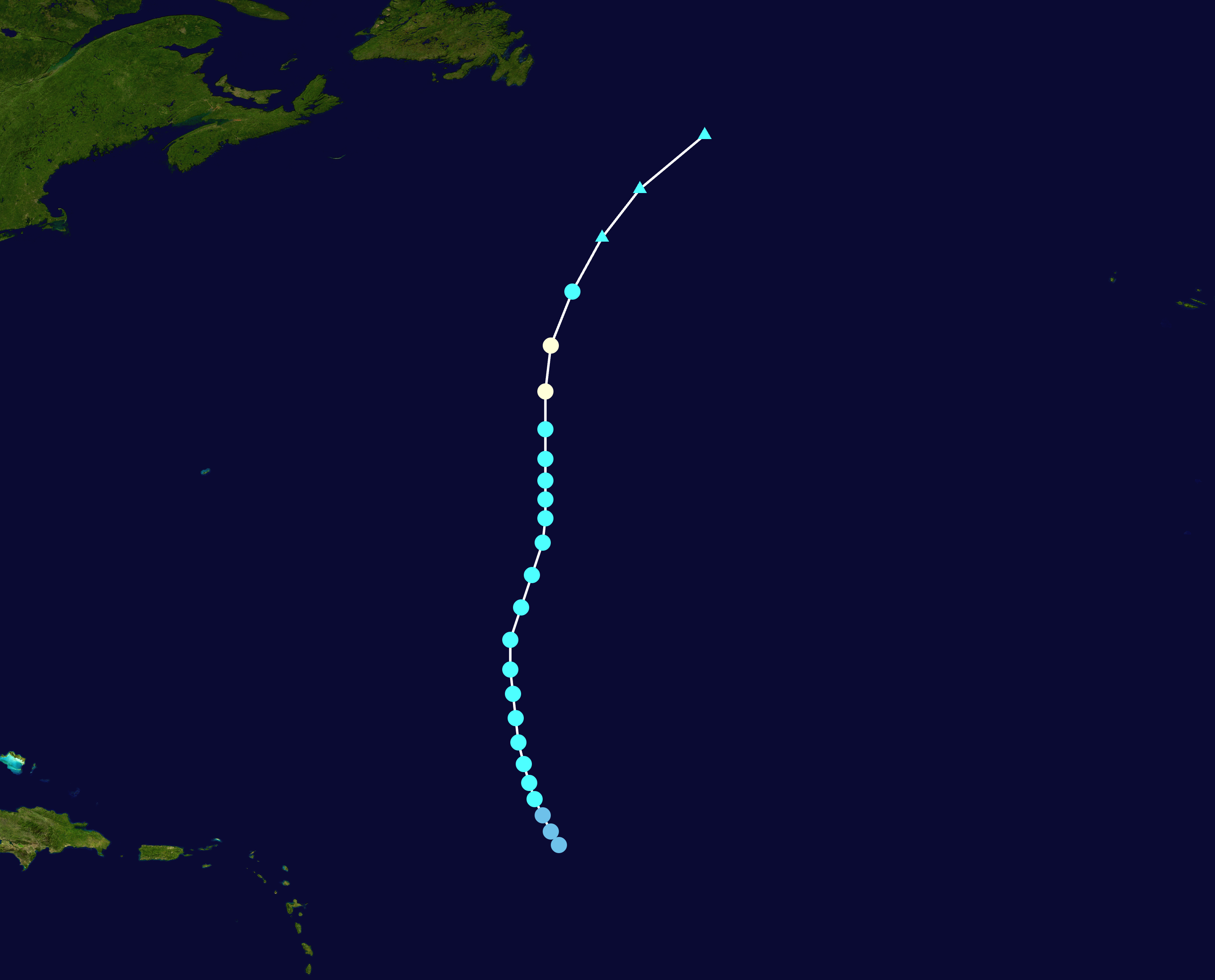
- Duration: September 23 – September 28
- Peak intensity: 75 mph (120 km/h) (1-min); 987 mbar (hPa)

A tropical depression formed about 635 miles (1,020 km) northeast of the Leeward Islands around 06:00 UTC on September 23. The cyclone maintained a general northward heading throughout its duration. Peripheral data from nearby ships indicate it attained tropical storm intensity early on September 24 and gradually strengthened to a Category 1 hurricane four days later, with peak winds of 75 mph (120 km/h). A gradual weakening trend ensued thereafter, and the storm transitioned into an extratropical cyclone around 00:00 UTC on September 28 while to the southeast of Newfoundland. The post-tropical low turned northeast and persisted for a little over a day before it was absorbed by a front or dissipated.

=== Tropical Storm Nine ===
- Tropical storm (SSHWS)
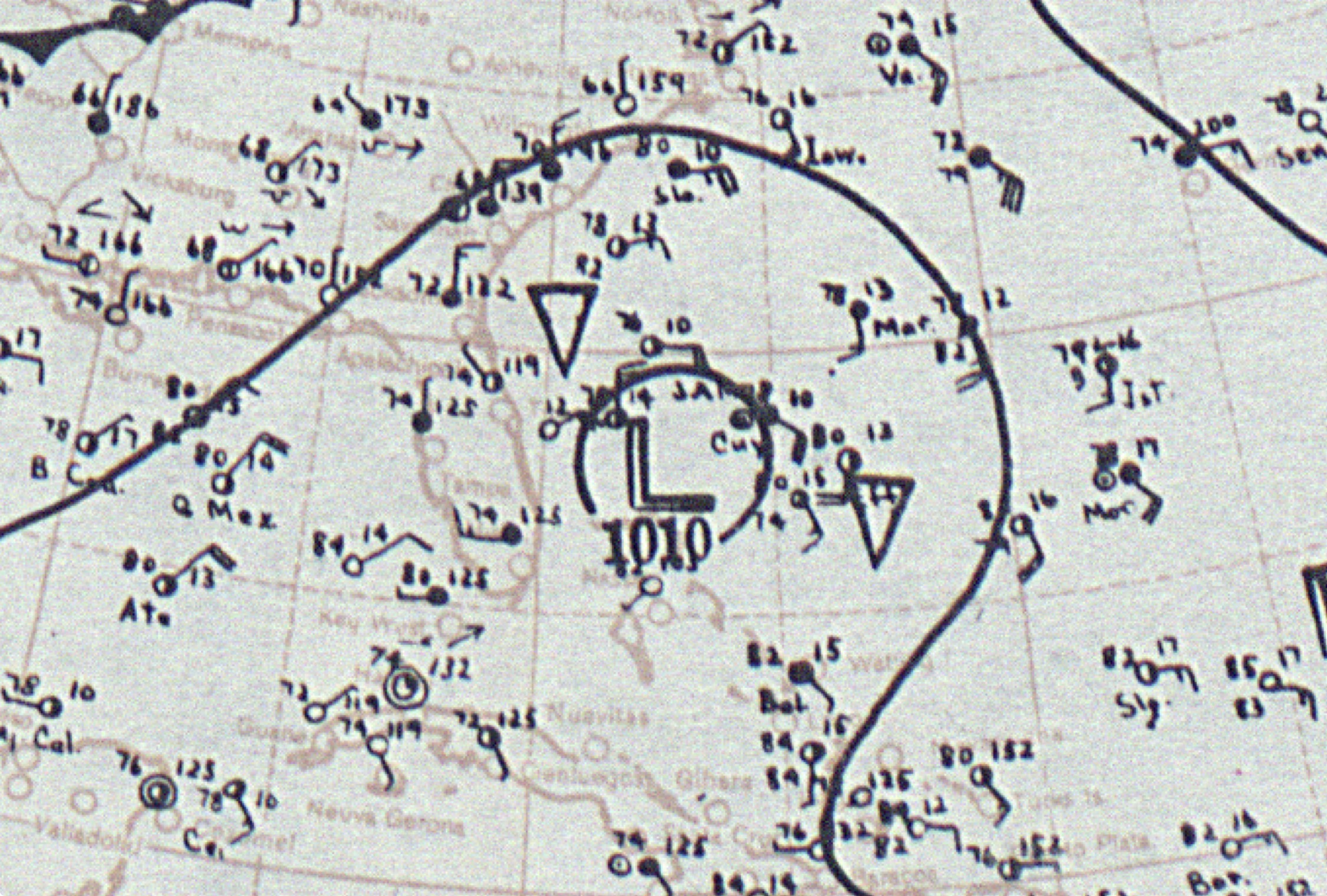
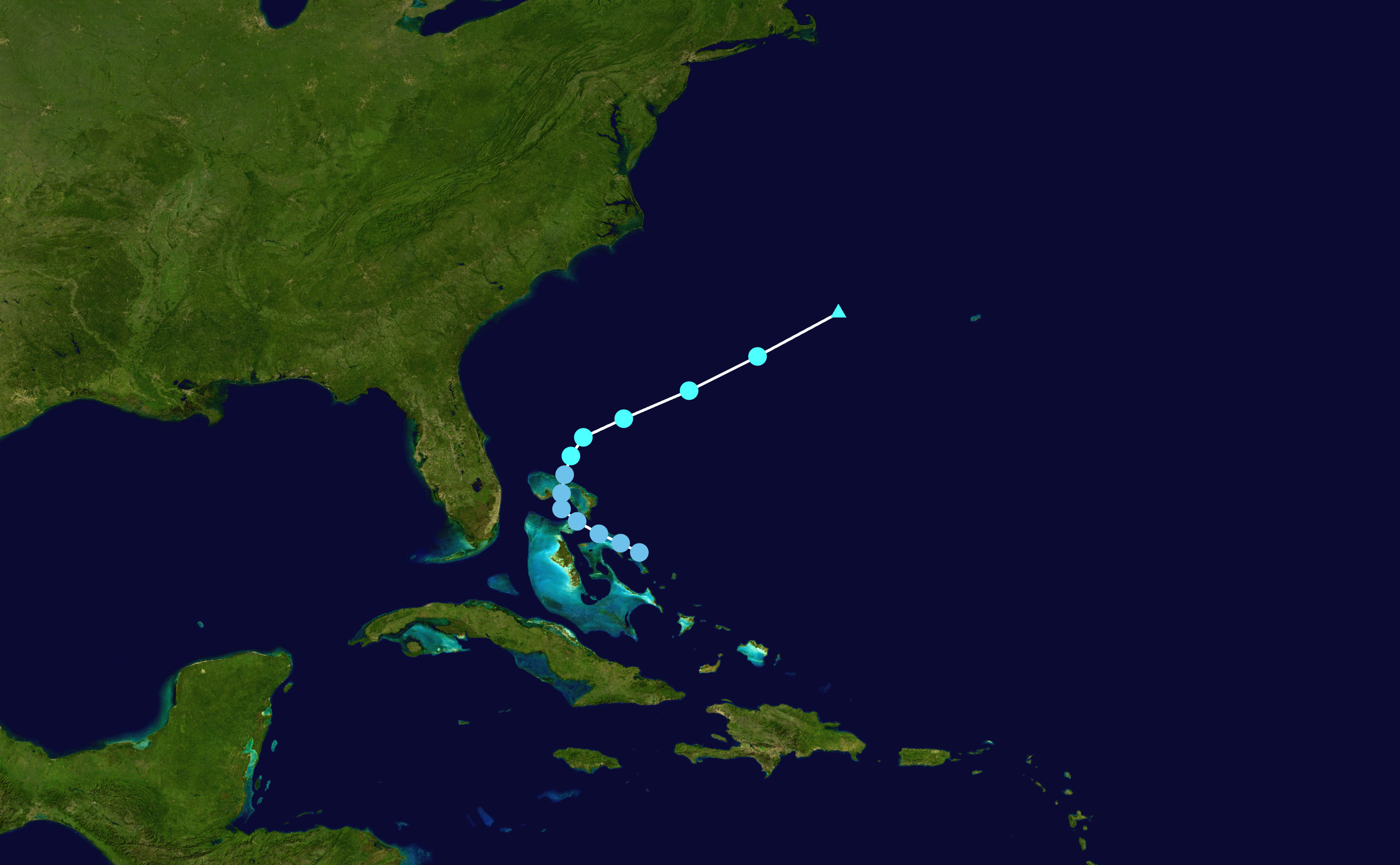
- Duration: October 13 – October 16
- Peak intensity: 45 mph (75 km/h) (1-min); 1000 mbar (hPa)

Another tropical cyclone was discovered as a part of the Atlantic hurricane reanalysis project. A tropical depression, which may have originated from a decaying frontal boundary, formed north of Cat Island in the Bahamas around 12:00 UTC on October 13. The cyclone moved west-northwest through the northern archipelago islands but failed to reach tropical storm intensity until early on October 15, when it had curved northeast away from the Bahamas. The broad system attained peak winds of 45 mph (75 km/h) before transitioning into an extratropical cyclone and combining with a nearby low by 12:00 UTC on October 16 to the west of Bermuda.

=== Tropical Storm Ten ===
- Tropical storm (SSHWS)
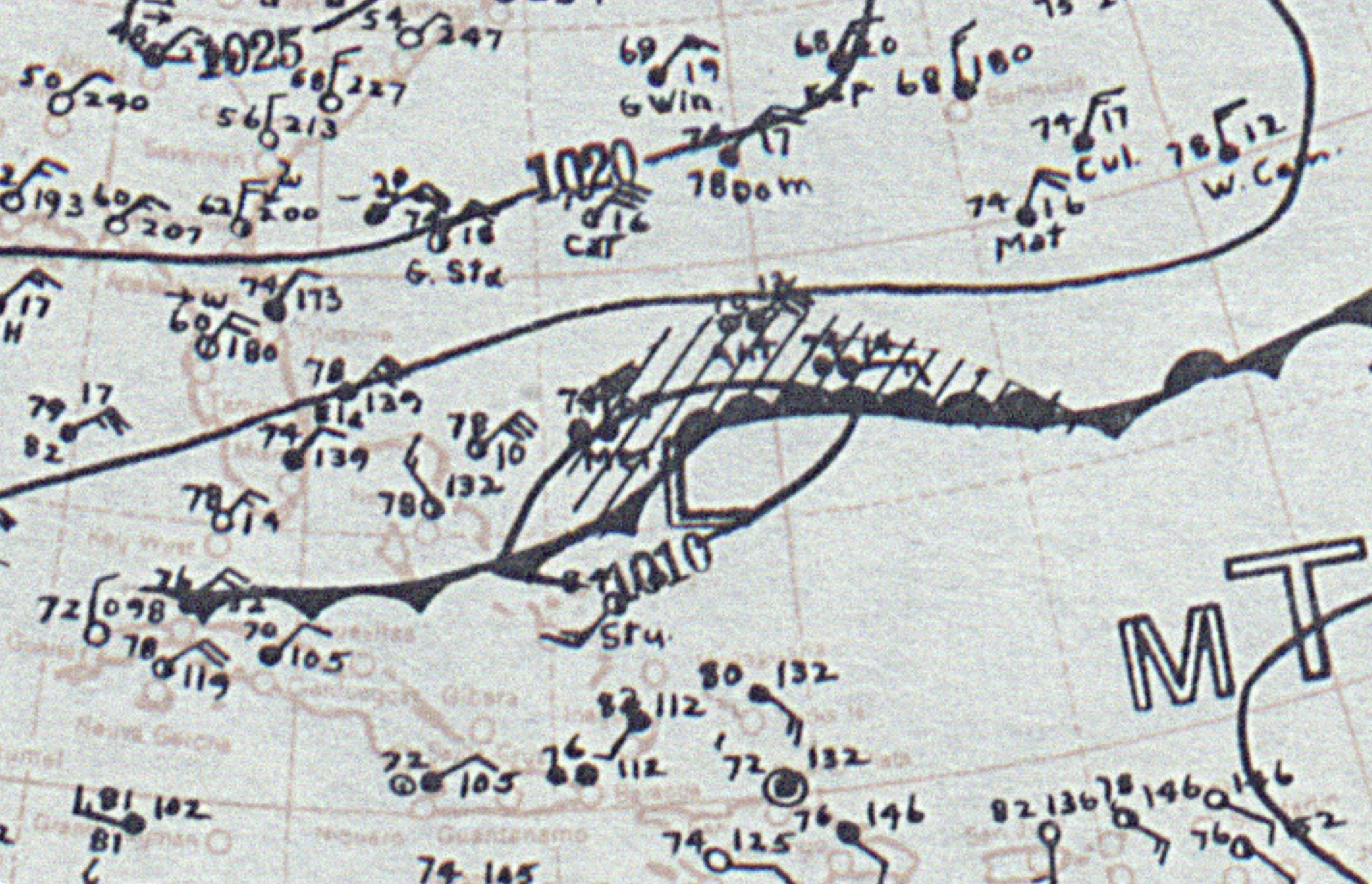
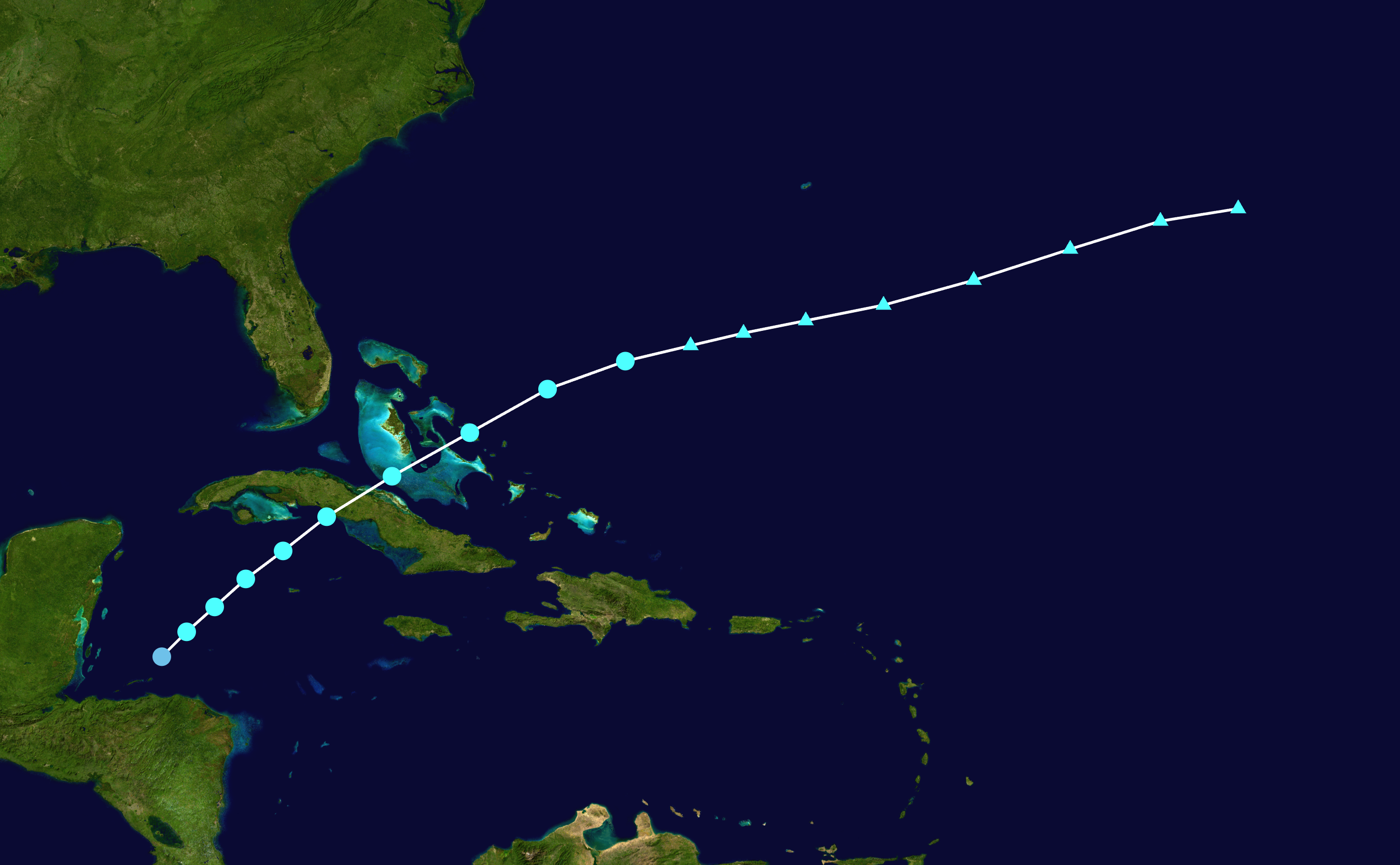
- Duration: October 18 – October 20
- Peak intensity: 45 mph (75 km/h) (1-min); 1004 mbar (hPa)

A broad trough or area of low pressure persisted in the western Caribbean Sea for a few days before organizing into a tropical depression north of Honduras around 12:00 UTC on October 18. It intensified into a tropical storm six hours later while moving northeast. The cyclone made landfall in central Cuba at 18:00 UTC on October 19 with winds of 45 mph (75 km/h); these winds mark its peak intensity as a tropical storm. After crossing Cuba, it continued through the Bahamas and into the western Atlantic, where it transitioned into an extratropical cyclone southwest of Bermuda by 00:00 UTC on October 21. The post-tropical low acquired peak winds of 65 mph (100 km/h) before dissipating east of Bermuda after 18:00 UTC the next day.

=== Tropical Storm Eleven ===
- Tropical storm (SSHWS)
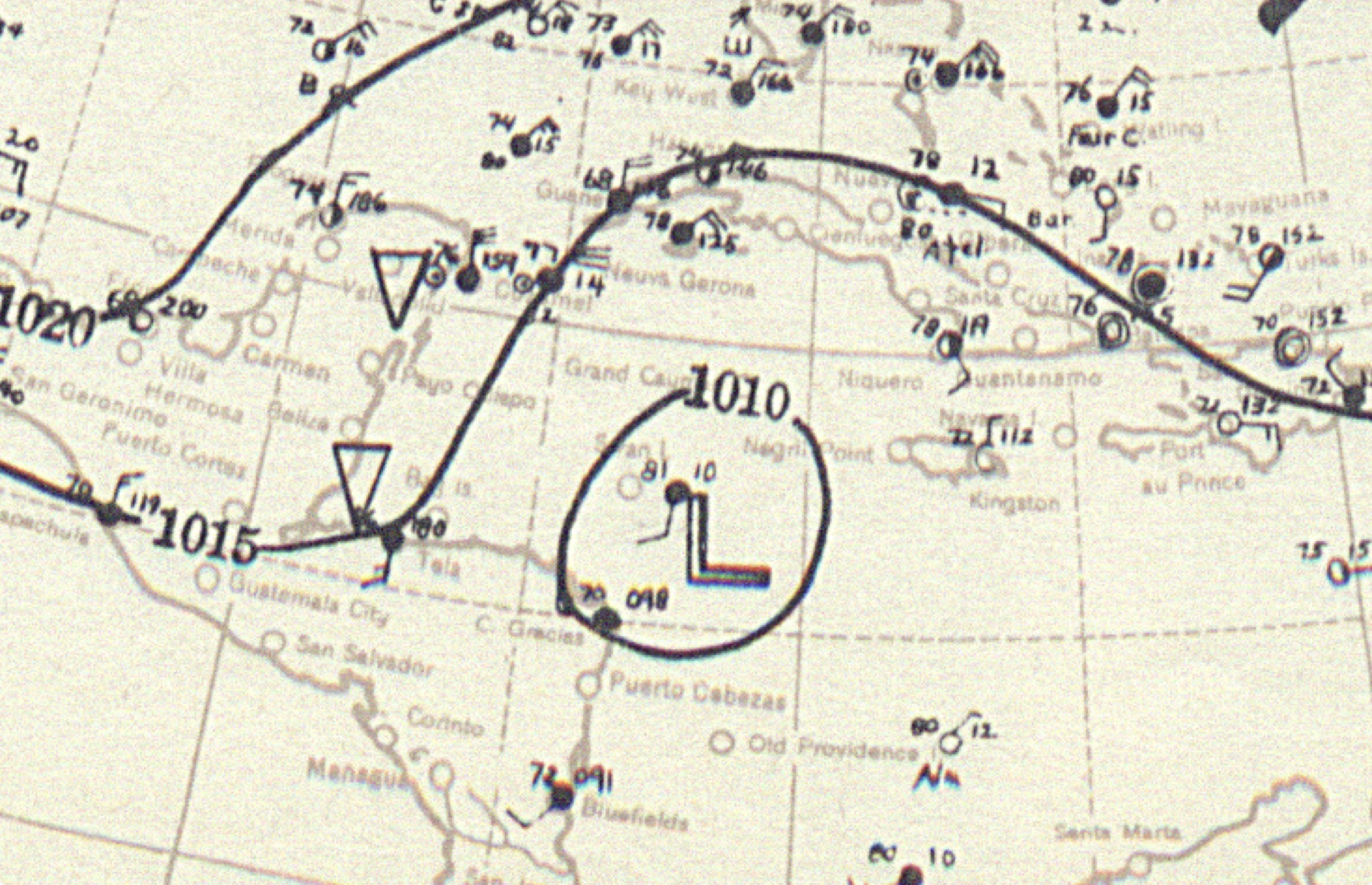
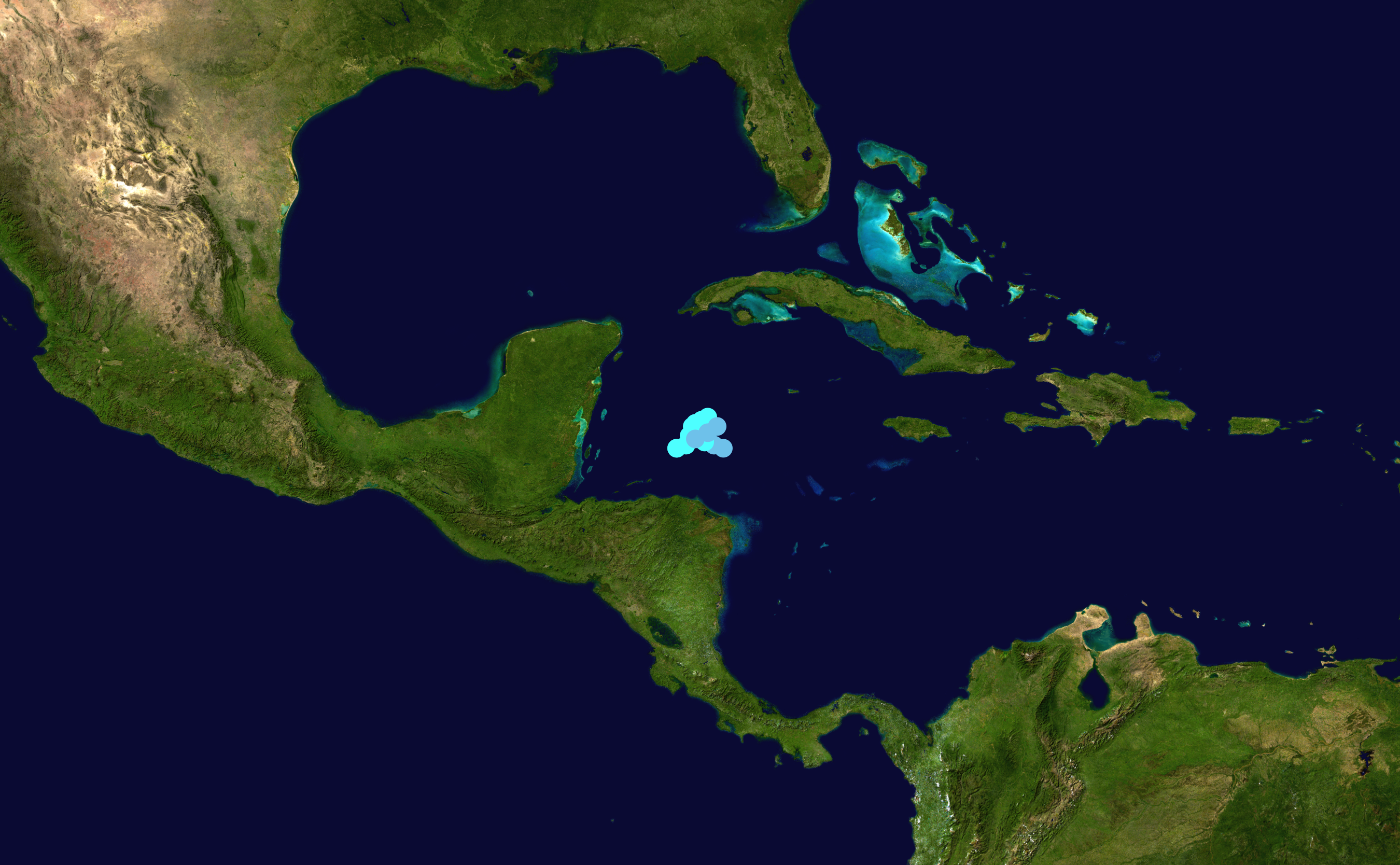
- Duration: November 1 – November 5
- Peak intensity: 65 mph (100 km/h) (1-min); 1011 mbar (hPa)

Yet another tropical cyclone identified in the Atlantic hurricane reanalysis project began as a tropical depression north of the Honduras–Nicaragua border around 12:00 UTC on November 1. It intensified into a tropical storm early the next day and later attained maximum sustained winds of 65 mph (100 km/h). For most of its duration, these winds were located 85–230 miles (135–370 km) from the center, suggesting the storm displayed some characteristics of a subtropical cyclone. After reaching its peak, the system began a gradual weakening trend and meandered over the western Caribbean Sea. It dissipated north of Honduras after 18:00 UTC on November 5.

=== Tropical Storm Twelve ===
- Tropical storm (SSHWS)
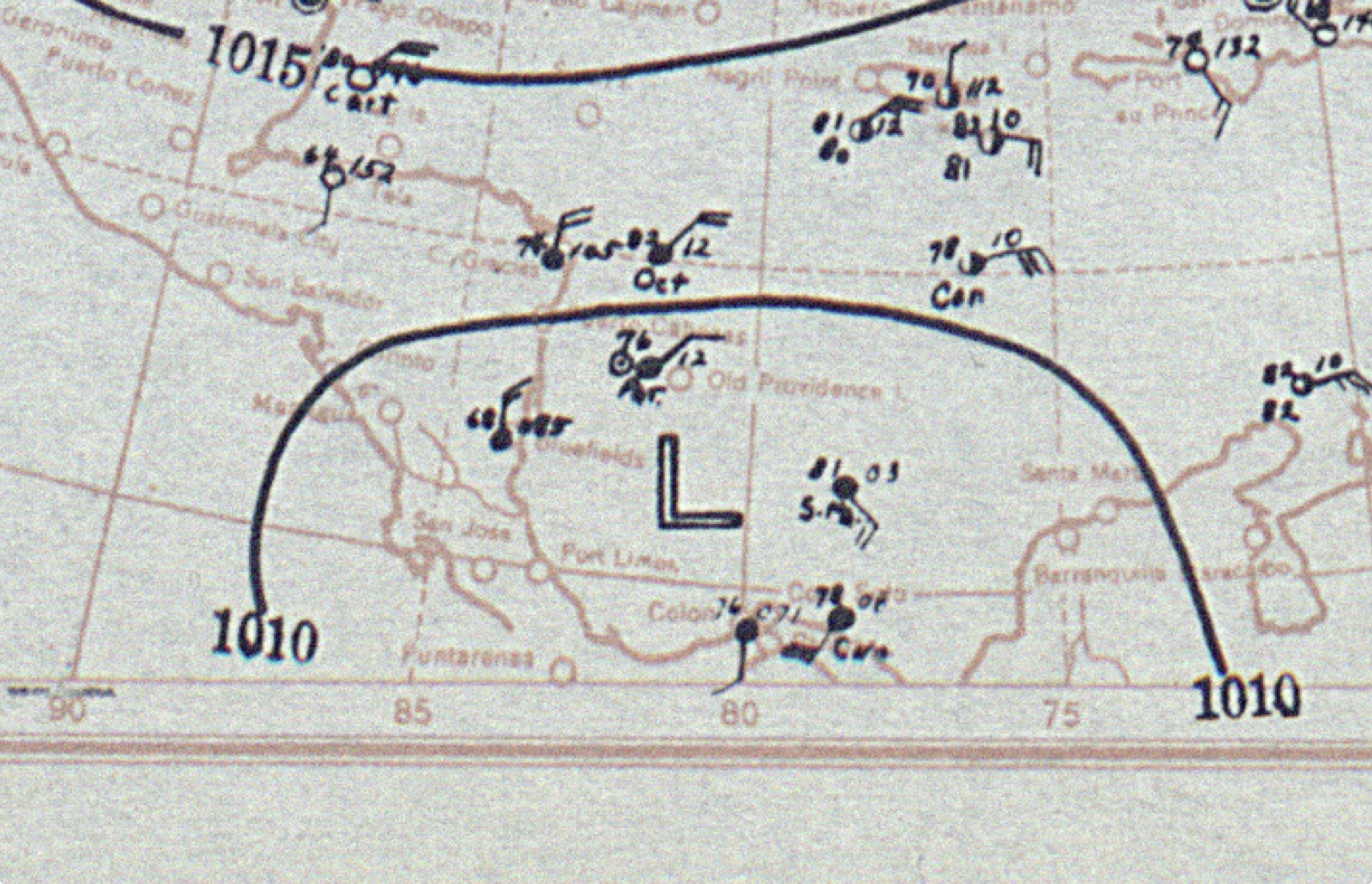
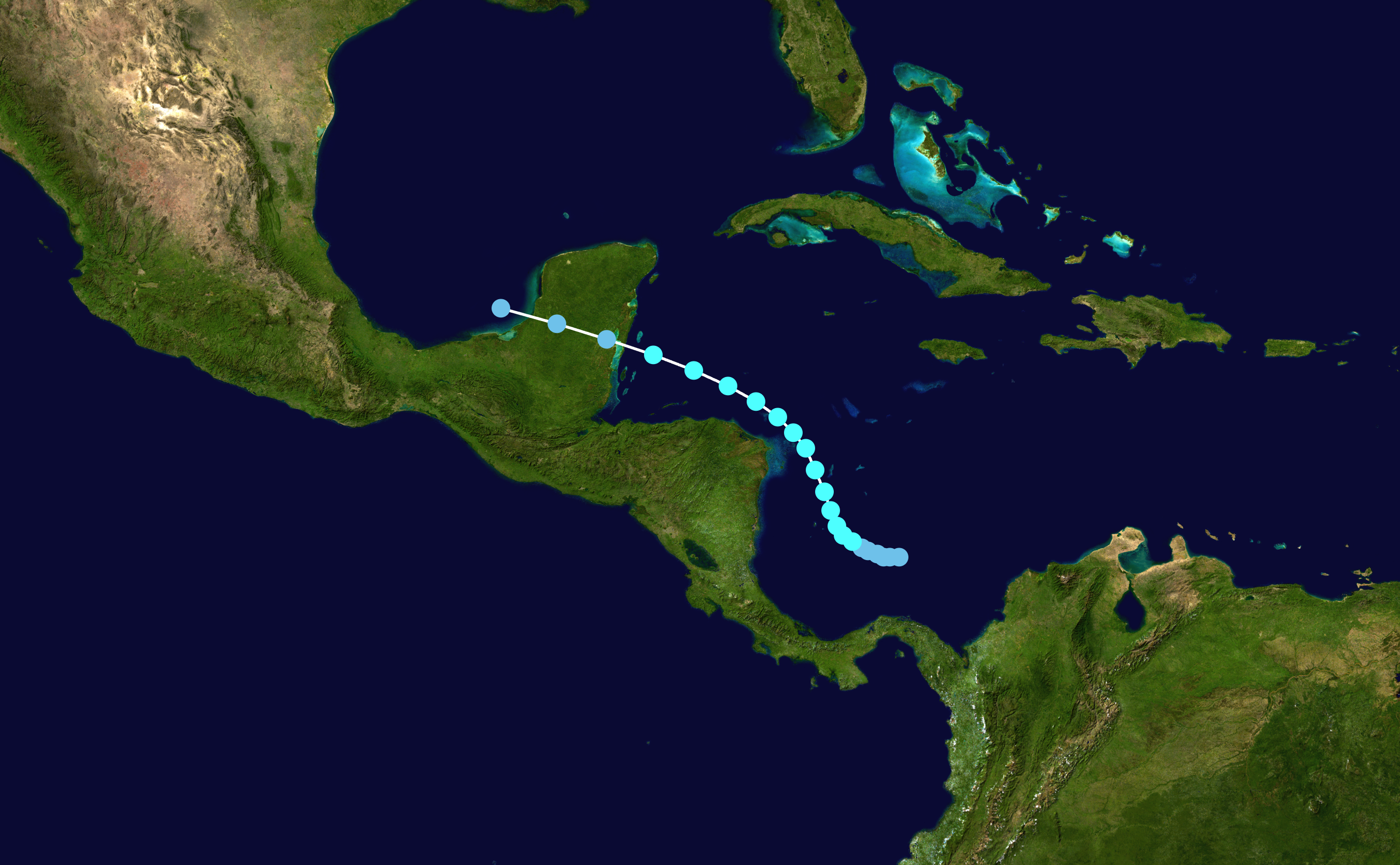
- Duration: November 11 – November 16
- Peak intensity: 50 mph (85 km/h) (1-min); 1003 mbar (hPa)

Another previously undocumented tropical cyclone began as an area of low pressure that persisted over the southwestern Caribbean Sea for several days in early November. It organized into a tropical depression by 12:00 UTC on November 11 and strengthened to a tropical storm early the next day. The system curved toward the north-northwest, narrowly avoiding Honduras and Nicaragua, but banked back toward the west-northwest thereafter and attained peak winds of 50 mph (85 km/h). The cyclone did not further strengthen in the western Caribbean, instead making landfall near Chetumal around 04:00 UTC on November 16 as a minimal tropical storm. It weakened over the Yucatán Peninsula and emerged into the Bay of Campeche, where the storm lost its closed circulation and dissipated after 18:00 UTC on November 16.

=== Tropical Storm Thirteen ===
- Tropical storm (SSHWS)
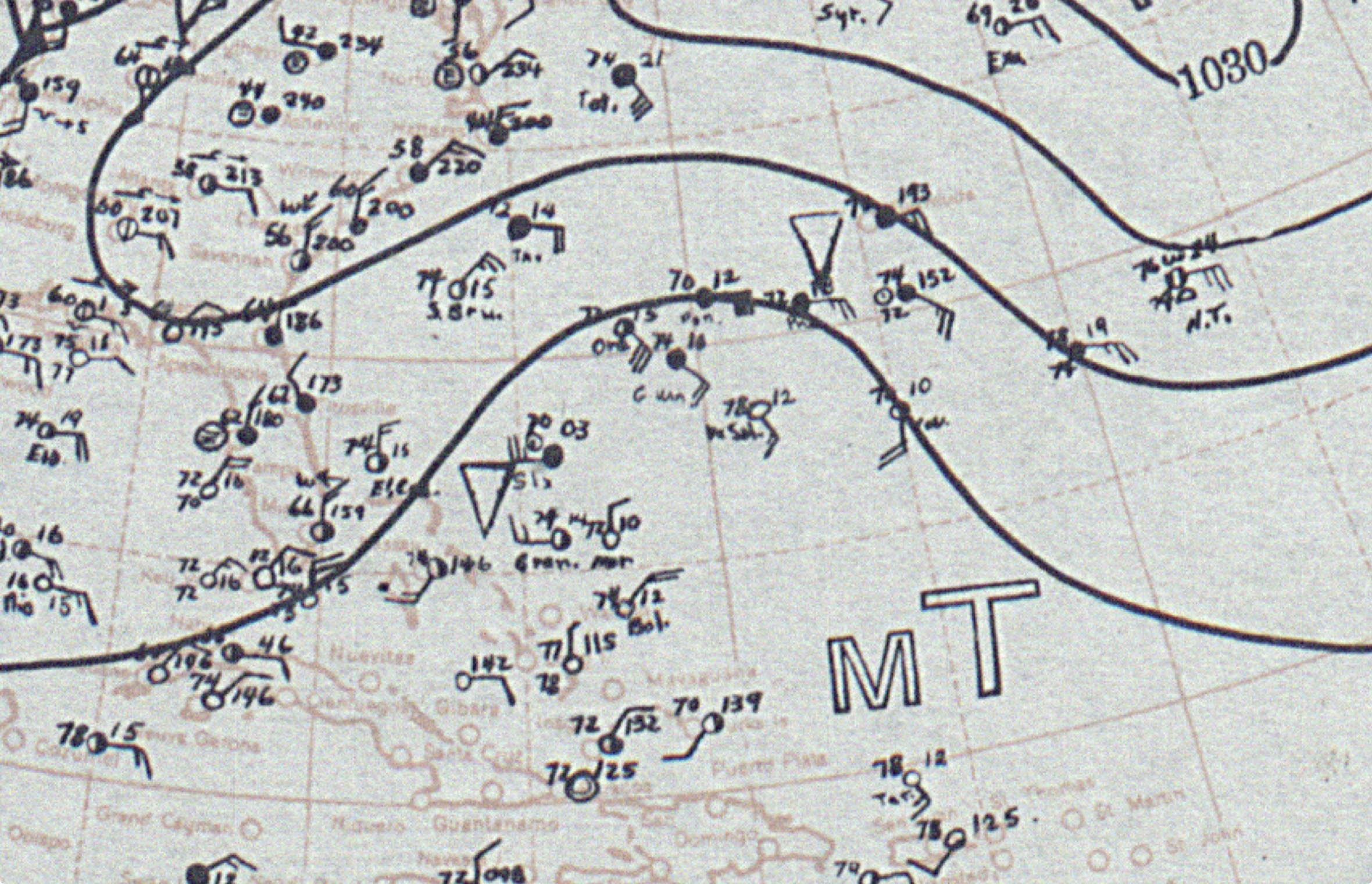
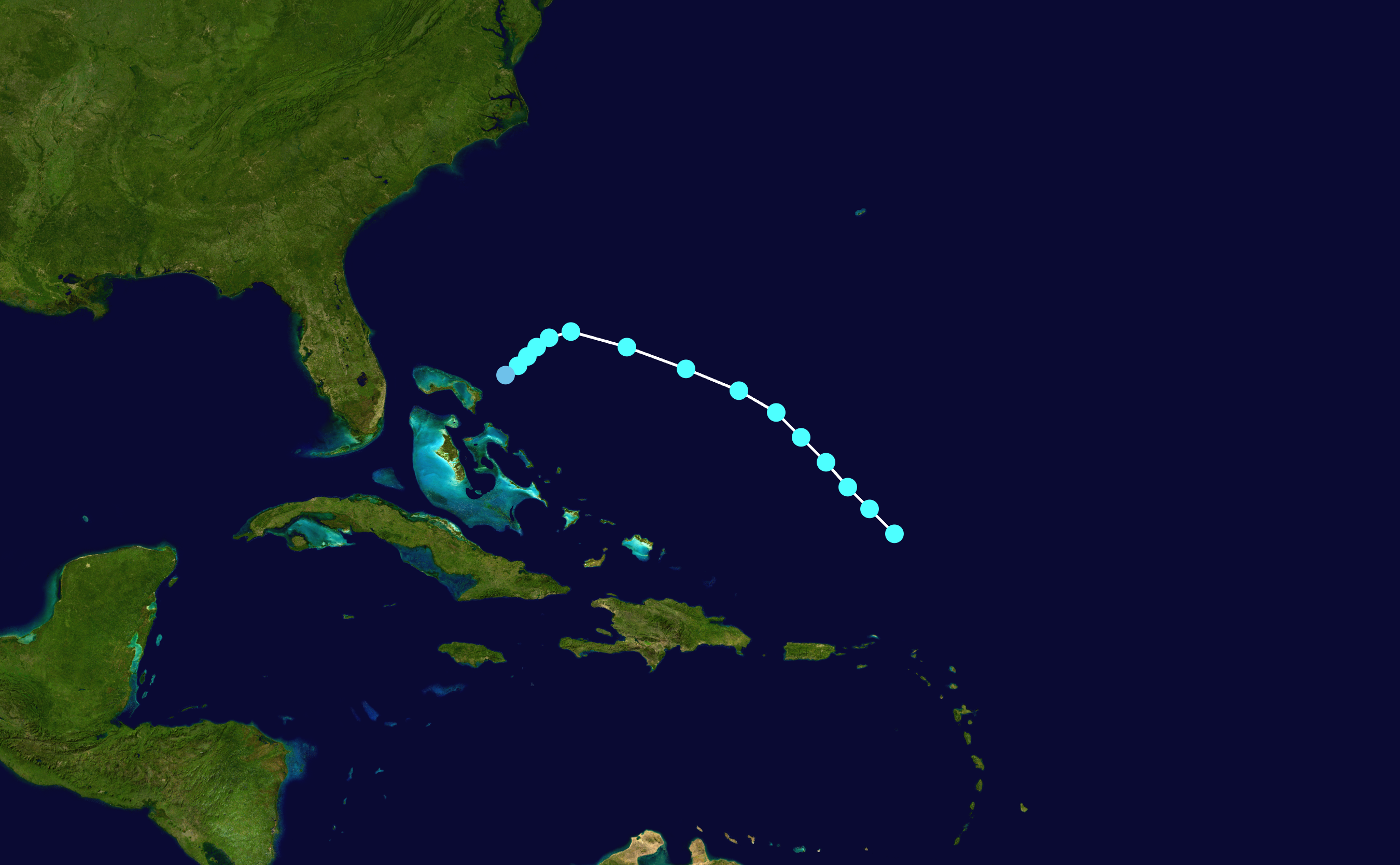
- Duration: November 22 – November 25
- Peak intensity: 65 mph (100 km/h) (1-min); 998 mbar (hPa)

The season's final system was first identified as a tropical storm north of the Leeward Islands around 06:00 UTC on November 22. Stormy weather was recorded on Antigua, and on Saint Lucia, a high tide coupled with 3.5 inches (89 mm) of rain in three hours flooded one building. The storm traveled west-northwest for two days before curving southwest, reaching peak winds of 65 mph (100 km/h) while doing so. Turning southwestward, the system weakened on approach to the Bahamas and dissipated after 18:00 UTC on November 25 to the northeast of Little Abaco Island. As part of the Atlantic hurricane reanalysis project, it was noted that this system may have been a subtropical cyclone for a portion of its duration.

== Season effects ==
The following table lists all of the storms that formed in the 1931 Atlantic hurricane season. It includes their duration, names, areas affected, damages, and death totals. Deaths in parentheses are indirect (an example of an indirect death would be a traffic accident), but were still related to that storm. Damage and deaths include totals from the storm's precursor and its remnants, and all of the damage figures are in 1931 USD.

Saffir–Simpson scale
TD	TS	C1	C2	C3	C4	C5

1931 North Atlantic tropical cyclone season statistics
Storm name	Dates active	Storm category at peak intensity	Max 1-min wind mph (km/h)	Min. press. (mbar)	Areas affected	Damage (US$)	Deaths	Ref(s).
One	June 24–28	Tropical storm	50 (85)	1002	Mexico, Texas	None	None	
Two	July 11–17	Tropical storm	70 (110)	996	Mexico, Texas, Louisiana, Mississippi, Arkansas, Oklahoma	Unknown	None	
Three	August 10–18	Tropical storm	60 (95)	1002	Windward Islands, Belize, Mexico	Unknown	None	
Four	August 16–21	Tropical storm	40 (65)	Unknown	Lesser Antilles, New Jersey	Unknown	1	
Five	September 1–4	Tropical storm	45 (75)	992	Lesser Antilles, Hispaniola	Unknown	30	
Six	September 6–13	Category 4 hurricane	130 (215)	952	Honduras, Belize, Mexico	$7.5 million	2,500	
Seven	September 16–22	Category 2 hurricane	100 (155)	987	Lesser Antilles, Hispaniola, Jamaica, Belize, Mexico	$100,000	2	
Eight	September 18–20	Category 1 hurricane	75 (120)	987	None	None	None	
Nine	October 13–16	Tropical storm	45 (75)	1000	Bahamas	None	None	
Ten	October 18–20	Tropical storm	45 (75)	1004	Cuba, Bahamas	Unknown	None	
Eleven	November 1–5	Tropical storm	65 (100)	1011	None	None	None	
Twelve	November 11–16	Tropical storm	50 (85)	1003	Nicaragua, Honduras, Belize, Mexico	Unknown	None	
Thirteen	November 22–25	Tropical storm	65 (100)	998	Lesser Antilles, Bahamas	Unknown	None	
Season aggregates
13 systems	June 25 – November 25		130 (215)	952		$7.6 million	2,533	

== See also ==
- Atlantic hurricane season
