= High Island School =

Public school in High Island, Texas, United States

Location
- 2113 6 St; High Island, Texas 77623; United States
- Coordinates: 29.5636°N 94.3900°W

Information
- School type: Public
- School district: High Island Independent School District
- Principal: Christopher Loftin
- Faculty: 14.41 (on FTE basis)
- Grades: 9-12
- Enrollment: 159 (2023-2024)
- Student to teacher ratio: 11.03
- Colors: Maroon and White
- Athletics conference: UIL 1A
- Mascot: Cardinal
- Website: High Island School

High Island School or High Island High School is a public school serving students grades PK–12 located in the High Island community of Galveston County, Texas, United States. It is the only school in the High Island Independent School District. Approximately 30 miles from the City of Galveston, it is zoned within the Bolivar Peninsula. It is attended by students residing in unincorporated communities within the Bolivar Peninsula Census-designated place, including High Island, Caplen, and Gilchrist. Students compete in UIL Conference 1A. In 2022, the school received an "A" rating from the Texas Education Agency.

== Athletics ==
The High Island High School students participate in the following sports:

- Baseball
- Basketball
- Football
- Softball
- Track
- Volleyball

== State Titles ==
=== State Finalists ===
- Football -
  - 1979 (B)
