= High Island Independent School District =

School district in Texas, United States

Address
- 2113 6th Street High Island, Texas, 77623; United States
- Coordinates: 29.5628°N 94.3909°W

District information
- Type: Public
- Grades: PK–12
- Schools: 1
- NCES District ID: 4823160

Students and staff
- Students: 159 (2023–2024)
- Teachers: 14.41 (on an FTE basis) (2023–2024)
- Staff: 13.70 (on an FTE basis) (2023–2024)
- Student–teacher ratio: 11.03 (2023–2024)

Other information
- Website: www.highislandisd.com

High Island Independent School District is a public school district based in unincorporated Galveston County, Texas, United States.

HIISD serves the communities of Caplen, High Island, and Gilchrist on the Bolivar Peninsula.

== History ==
Circa 2003 some Bolivar Peninsula residents in the Galveston Independent School District (GISD) portion who were dissatisfied with the Crenshaw School, the then-two-campus GISD K-8 school on the peninsula, sent their children to High Island schools. Crenshaw was rebuilt as a single campus in 2005.

The school district lost approximately 15% of its students in 2008 due to homes and residences destroyed by Hurricane Ike In the fall of 2009, the district reported an enrollment of 186 students.

As of the 2023–2024 school year, the district's student population was 159 students, with a student-to-teacher ratio of approximately 11:3.

== Academic achievement ==
In 2009, the school district was rated "academically acceptable" by the Texas Education Agency.

== Schools ==
- High Island School (PK-12)

== Special programs ==
=== Athletics ===
High Island High School plays six-man football.

== See also ==
- List of school districts in Texas
