= Caplen, Texas =

Unincorporated community in Texas, US

Coordinates: 29°29′59″N 94°31′24″W

Caplen is an unincorporated community that is part of the Bolivar Peninsula census-designated place, in Galveston County, Texas, United States.

== Government and infrastructure ==
On April 23, 1991, the community, and other areas of Galveston County, received an enhanced 9-1-1 system which routes calls to proper dispatchers and allows dispatchers to automatically view the address of the caller.

Unincorporated areas in Galveston County receive animal services from the Galveston County Animal Resource Center, an animal shelter operated by the Galveston County Health District in Texas City.

Unincorporated areas in Galveston County receive emergency medical services from the Galveston Area Ambulance Authority (GAAA), also operated by the health district.

== Education ==
Caplen students are zoned to schools in the High Island Independent School District.

High Island ISD (and therefore Caplen) is assigned to Galveston College in Galveston.

== Parks and recreation ==
The Galveston County Department of Parks and Senior Services operates the Lauderdale Boat Ramp in Caplen.
