= Evergreen Cemetery =

Evergreen Cemetery may refer to the following cemeteries in the United States (listed by state, then city/town):

== Alaska ==
- Evergreen Cemetery (Juneau, Alaska)

== Arizona ==
- Evergreen Cemetery (Bisbee, Arizona), listed on the National Register of Historic Places (NRHP) in Cochise County, Arizona

== Arkansas ==
- Evergreen Cemetery (Fayetteville, Arkansas), listed on the NRHP in Washington County, Arkansas

== California ==
- Evergreen Cemetery (Los Angeles), California
- Evergreen Cemetery (Oakland, California), site for the memorial plaque honoring the victims of the Jonestown Massacre
- Evergreen Cemetery (Riverside, California)
- Evergreen Cemetery (Santa Cruz, California)

== Colorado ==
- Evergreen Cemetery (Colorado Springs, Colorado), listed on the NRHP in El Paso County, Colorado
- Ute Cemetery, listed on the NRHP in Aspen, Colorado, and sometimes known as Evergreen Cemetery

== Connecticut ==
- Evergreen Cemetery (Avon, Connecticut)
- Evergreen Cemetery (New Haven, Connecticut)

== Florida ==
- Evergreen Cemetery (Bartow, Florida)
- Evergreen Cemetery (Fort Lauderdale, Florida), a cemetery in Florida
- Evergreen Cemetery (Jacksonville, Florida), listed on the NRHP in Duval County, Florida
- Evergreen Cemetery (Ocala, Florida)

== Illinois ==
- Evergreen Cemetery (Bloomington, Illinois)
- Evergreen Cemetery (Chester, Illinois), in Chester, Illinois; location of the Governor Bond State Memorial

== Kentucky ==
- Evergreen Cemetery (Southgate, Kentucky)

== Maine ==
- Evergreen Cemetery in Houlton, Maine
- Evergreen Cemetery (Portland, Maine), listed on the NRHP in Cumberland County, Maine

== Massachusetts ==
- Evergreen Cemetery (Boston, Massachusetts), listed on the NRHP in Suffolk County, Massachusetts
- Evergreen Cemetery (Medway, Massachusetts), listed on the NRHP in Norfolk County, Massachusetts

== Michigan ==
- Evergreen Cemetery (Detroit, Michigan), on Woodward Avenue, Detroit

== New Jersey ==
- Evergreen Cemetery (Hillside, New Jersey), listed on the NRHP in Union County, New Jersey
- Evergreen Cemetery (Morristown, New Jersey)

== New York ==
- Cemetery of the Evergreens, Brooklyn, New York
- Evergreen Cemetery (Pine Plains, New York)
- White Store Church and Evergreen Cemetery, Norwich, New York, listed on the NRHP in Chenango County, New York
- Evergreen Cemetery (Owego, New York), listed on the NRHP in Tioga County, New York
- Evergreen Cemetery (Tannersville, New York)

== Pennsylvania ==
- Evergreen Cemetery (Adams County, Pennsylvania)

== Tennessee ==
- Evergreen Cemetery (Murfreesboro, Tennessee)

== Vermont ==
- Evergreen Cemetery (Rutland, Vermont)

== Virginia ==
- Evergreen Cemetery (Richmond, Virginia)

== Washington ==
- Evergreen Cemetery (Everett, Washington), a cemetery containing a pyramid mausoleum
- Evergreen Washelli Memorial Park, Seattle, Washington

== Wisconsin ==
- Evergreen Cemetery (Menomonie, Wisconsin), listed on the NRHP in Dunn County, Wisconsin

== See also ==
- Evergreen Memorial Park (disambiguation)
