= Evergreen Park =

Evergreen Park may refer to:

- Evergreen Park, New Brunswick, a place in Canada
- Evergreen Park, Illinois, a village in the United States
- Evergreen Park (Haikou), a park in Hainan Province, China

== See also ==
- Evergreen Cemetery (disambiguation)
- Evergreen Memorial Park (disambiguation)
