= Effects of Hurricane Ike in inland North America =

Hurricane Ike
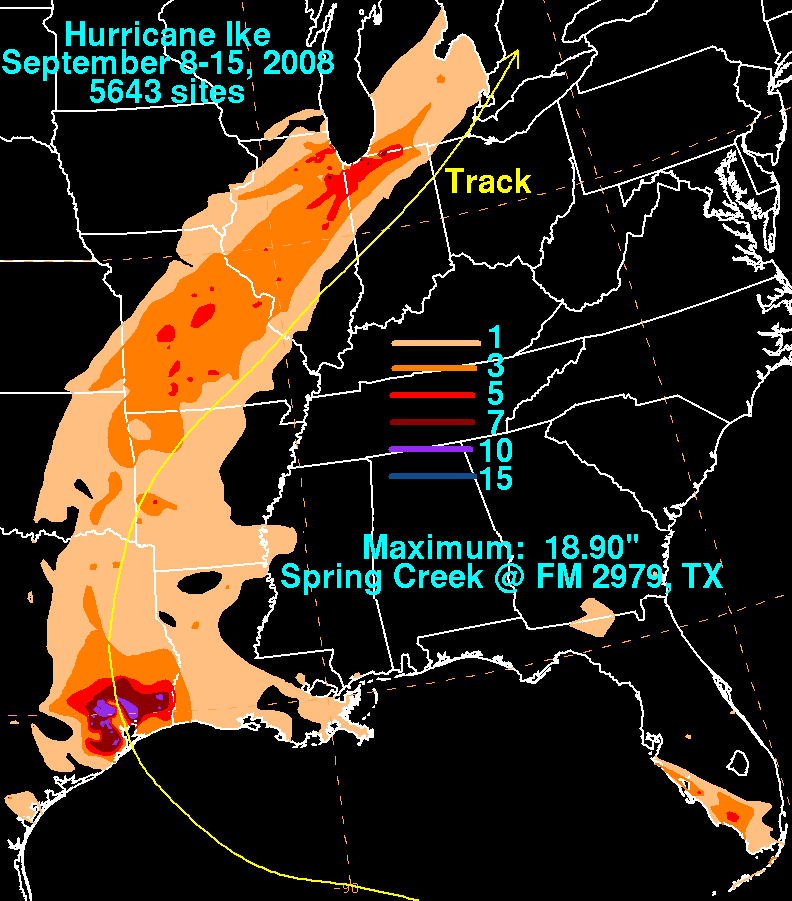
- Ike's storm total rainfall across the United States

Category 1 hurricane
- 1-minute sustained (SSHWS/NWS)
- Highest winds: 75 mph (120 km/h)

Overall effects
- Fatalities: 26
- Damage: $560 million (2008 USD)
- Areas affected: Midwestern United States, Tennessee, Kentucky, New York, Ontario, Ohio
- Part of the 2008 Atlantic hurricane season

The effects of Hurricane Ike in inland North America, in September 2008, were unusually intense and included widespread damage across all or parts of eleven states – Arkansas, Illinois, Indiana, Kentucky, Michigan, Missouri, New York, Ohio, Pennsylvania, Tennessee and West Virginia, (not including Louisiana and Texas where the storm made landfall) and into parts of Ontario as Ike, which had rapidly become an extratropical cyclone, was enhanced by an adjacent frontal boundary and produced widespread winds with gusts to hurricane-force in several areas. In addition, significant flooding which was already underway due to heavy rain from the front to the north was worsened by rainfall brought on by Ike in parts of Missouri, Illinois and Indiana to the west of the center.

The severe winds reported across the Midwest to the east of the center (although little or no rain fell in many of those areas) were as a result of a combination of factors, including the strength and size of Ike itself allowing for a strong pressure gradient and a well-defined structure, the location on the east side of the storm where the winds are usually stronger in a northward-moving system due to its forward motion, its fast forward motion of about 40 mph (64 km/h), and the warm air ahead of the storm allowed the high winds aloft to reach the surface easier. Many areas reported wind gusts up to hurricane force.

It was one of the largest power outages caused by a natural disaster in the history of the Midwest, with around 3.7 million customers losing power (well over 8 million people), including 2.6 million outages in the state of Ohio alone 26 people were killed in the interior states. Ohio alone sustained over $560 million in damage.

== Arkansas ==
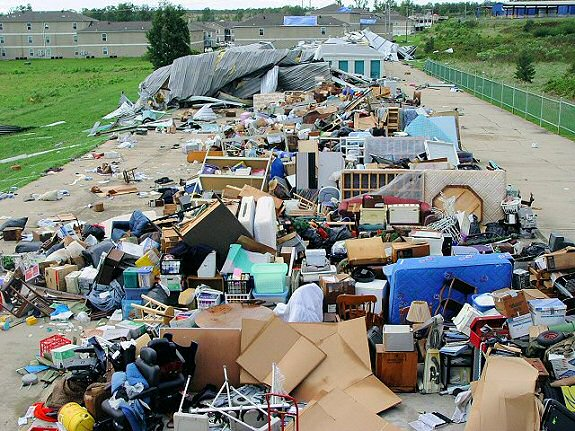
A self-storage warehouse building was destroyed by a tornado southwest of Cabot, Arkansas

In Arkansas, about 200,000 customers lost power as a result of the winds, the worst power loss in that state since an ice storm in 2000. Damage was widespread, with trees and power lines knocked down in many areas. At least five tornadoes—all rated EF1 on the Enhanced Fujita Scale—were reported, in Garland, Hot Spring, Lonoke, Perry and Saline Counties. The Lonoke County tornado caused some structural damage near Cabot, including a storage unit and several metal buildings at a lumber mill that were destroyed, a strip mall that was heavily damaged and many signs blown down. Arkansas was spared the significant rainfall that areas farther north saw though. One person was killed when a tree fell onto a mobile home near Fisher, Arkansas.

== Tennessee and Missouri ==
Two deaths occurred when a tree fell onto two people on a golf course in Hermitage, Tennessee, just outside Nashville.

Parts of Missouri, particularly around St. Louis, sustained major flooding. In St. Charles County, the Missouri River reached well above flood stage with forecasts as high as 11 feet (3.4 m) above flood stage, and seven private levees were threatened. Another hard-hit community was Arnold, where the Meramec River threatened to reach major flood stage for the third time in 2008, although sandbags were still up from the March flood there. The high winds in southeastern Missouri, particularly the Bootheel, also blew corn stalks down and caused severe damage to crops. The winds and rain knocked out power to about 85,000 customers in Missouri.

A woman was also struck and killed by a large tree limb in Ladue, Missouri, and two bodies of a man and a woman who presumably drowned were found in University City, Missouri, outside of St. Louis. Another drowning took place in floodwaters in Columbia, Missouri.

== Kentucky ==
The Louisville area declared a state of emergency due to major damage, and the Louisville International Airport was closed temporarily. A LG&E spokesperson said that this was the worst power outage in 30 years. Near Covington, the Cincinnati-Northern Kentucky International Airport was also temporarily shut down, and the control tower was evacuated. Also in Covington, an apartment building lost its entire roof and the Renaissance Hotel also sustained damage. Later in the day, a statewide state of emergency was declared in Kentucky by Governor Steve Beshear. All school districts in the three northernmost counties in the state, except two (Southgate Independent Schools and Kenton County Schools) were closed or delayed in the first 3 days following the storm.

In the Louisville area, over 300,000 customers were without power - the worst power outage in the utility's history. In western Kentucky, outside crews had to be brought in from as far away as Mississippi to restore power. Statewide, well over 600,000 customers lost electricity as a result of the winds.

In Simpsonville, a boy was struck and killed by a blown tree limb while outdoors.

== Illinois and Indiana ==
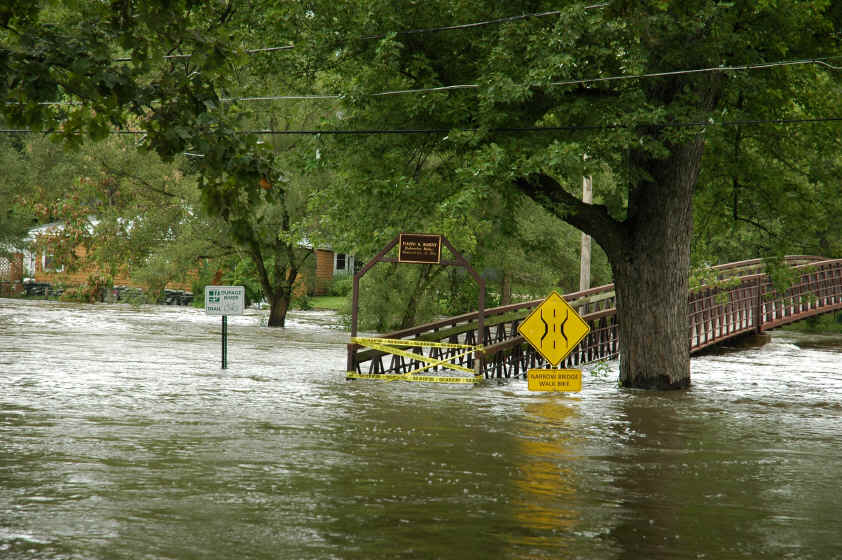
Flooding near a pedestrian bridge in Shorewood, Illinois

Much of Illinois suffered significant flooding. The hardest hit rivers were the DuPage, Des Plaines and Chicago Rivers. Many volunteers were called in to fill sandbags in an attempt to hold back the rising rivers. Dozens of people had to be rescued by boat. The corn and soybean crops were also threatened in many areas as a result of the heavy rainfall. In Riverside, several neighborhoods and much of the local forest preserve area were submerged in up to 2 to 4 feet of rapidly flowing water by the swollen Des Plaines River. A state of emergency was declared in Chicago and Cook County as a result of the floodwaters, and was later extended statewide by Governor Rod Blagojevich. About 49,000 customers lost power in Illinois. Effects were not limited to the state's northeastern corner; in the southwestern city of Chester, the Governor Bond State Memorial was severely damaged by the hurricane.

The northwestern part of Indiana was hard hit by flooding, which was partially related to the frontal boundary and partially related to Ike. One of the hardest-hit communities was Munster, where 5,000 residents had to be evacuated as a result of the Little Calumet River overflowing in many spots and breaking through the levee near the Calumet Avenue bridge. Several people had to be rescued by boat and there was a garage fire and a massive house explosion in the flooded area that leveled one house and damaged others. Parts of Interstates 80 and 94 were closed due to flooding, slowing traffic greatly in the region.

In Indiana, about 350,000 customers lost power statewide, mostly in the southern part. The fields of southern Indiana were heavily impacted, and a spokesman the state's Natural Resource Conservation Service described the situation as a "severe crop loss" and the "worst wind damage I have ever seen". A state of emergency was later declared by Governor Mitch Daniels. Strong winds blew off the steeple of St. Mary's Catholic Church in New Albany, Indiana.

Seven deaths were reported in Indiana. Two deaths took place in Chesterton as a result of flooding, and five deaths due to fallen trees in other parts of Indiana - two in Clark County and one each in Crawford, Perry and Ohio Counties. Two deaths were reported in Illinois, both of which were drownings.

== Ohio and Michigan ==
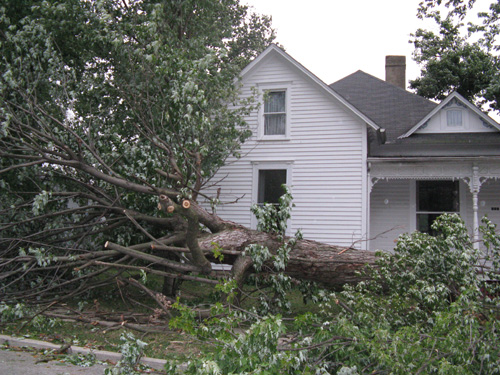
A large tree down in front of a house in Wilmington, Ohio

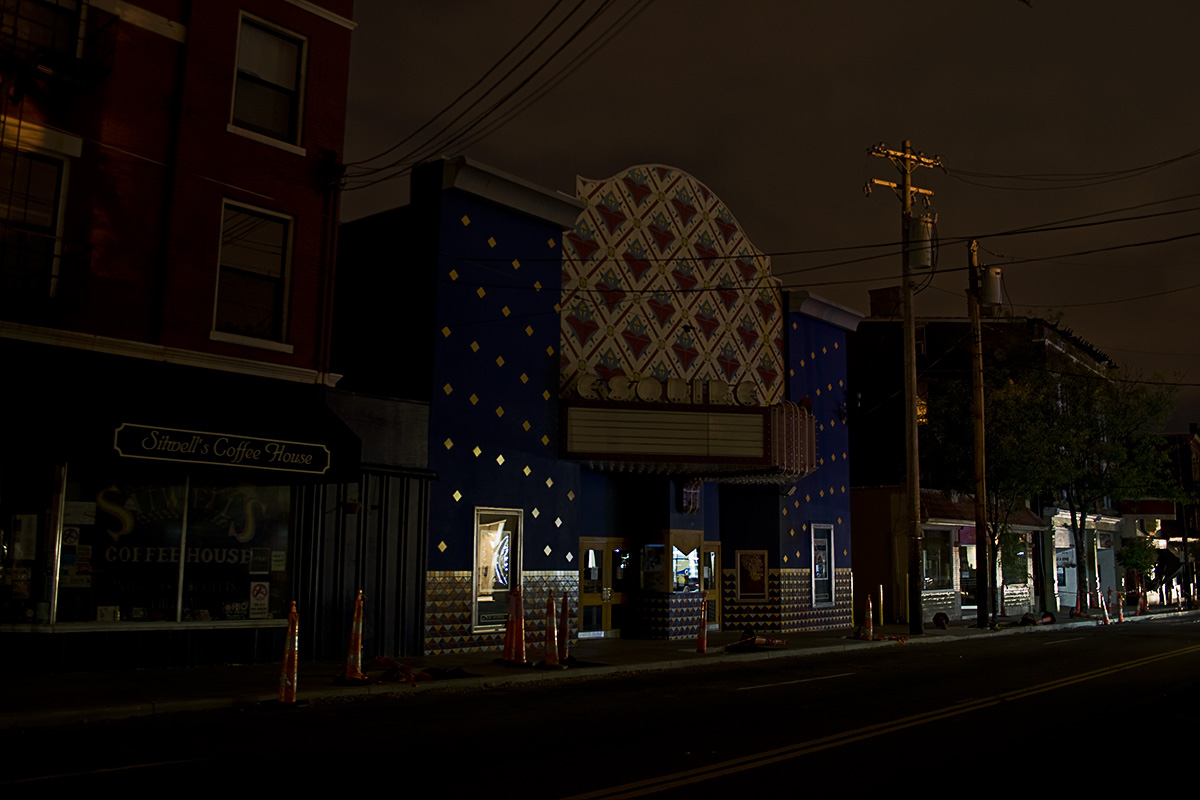
The Esquire Theater on Ludlow Avenue in Cincinnati during the blackout

Ohio was hit extremely hard by the storm. Wind gusts of over 75 mph (121 km/h) were recorded in Cincinnati, Dayton and Columbus, which is equivalent to sustained wind levels found in a Category 1 hurricane. The remnants of Ike caused a total of 2.6 million power outages in the state of Ohio, 330,000 of them for over a week. A state of emergency was declared on Monday by Governor Ted Strickland. On September 16 and 17, Governor Strickland took a tour of the heavily damaged areas, particularly in Cincinnati, Columbus and Dayton to survey the damage. Ike caused $1.255 billion in damage in Ohio.

The Cincinnati metropolitan area was hit extremely hard, with over 927,000 households losing power in that region (approximately 2.1 million people). A Duke Energy spokesperson said, "We have never seen anything like this. Never. We're talking about 90 percent of our customers without power". On September 15, 16 and 17, most of the schools in Hamilton County and Butler County had classes cancelled because of power outages. In Cincinnati, the effects of this storm have become known as The Cincinnati Blackout. A water emergency was also declared in Butler County as the water supply diminished due to the lack of power, and a "Level One" emergency was declared in the county to encourage people to remain at home, although stopping short of a curfew.

In the Dayton, Ohio area 300,000 of 515,000 Dayton Power & Light Co. customers lost power at some point following severe wind storms on the afternoon of September 14, according to a company spokesperson. As of Thursday morning, September 18, 90,000 DP&L customers remained without power. Also hard hit were central Ohio (with over 350,000 customers losing power) and northeastern Ohio (with over 310,000 customers losing power). A curfew was implemented on September 17 in Carlisle due to increased looting activity as a result of the lengthy power outage and damage.

There were 370,000 outages in the state capital of Columbus. Many of the citizens in Columbus were without power for close to a week, because 25 percent of the AEP company's workers were in Texas helping crews there restore electricity to the millions who lost power because of Hurricane Ike. All the major school districts in Columbus were closed for at least two days.

Agricultural damage was severe, with as much as 20% of the state's total corn crop lost as a result of winds blowing down corn stalks. Some fields were nearly flattened by the hurricane-force wind gusts. Tens of thousands of people also lost power in northwest Ohio where widespread outages and damage were reported in the Lima and Findlay areas as the center of the storm tracked just to the north and west. Some of the most significant damage there included a radio tower that collapsed and a church that was heavily damaged.

In Mount Healthy, a tree crushing a house resulted in one fatality, and two others died when a tree crashed onto a motorcycle parade in Hueston Woods State Park near Oxford. A similar incident in Lorain County also resulted in the death of a young boy who was hit by a fallen tree limb. An indirect death in Hilliard was caused by electrocution while working on a generator, and another in St. Bernard was caused by a candle fire while power was out.

The southern part of Michigan sustained heavy rainfall resulting in many houses being flooded, partially due to Ike and partially due to the frontal boundary. Two deaths were reported in Michigan - both drownings, one in a ditch and one in a vehicle. Tornado warnings were also issued across Southern Michigan, for Van Buren, Kalamazoo, and Calhoun counties. A tornado was confirmed in Wayne County, resulting in localized damage associated with EF-2 force winds.

== Pennsylvania, West Virginia and New York ==
In total, over 180,000 customers lost power as a result of the high winds in western Pennsylvania. The damage eventually resulted in a state of emergency declaration by Governor Ed Rendell. In Oil City, one death took place as a result of a fallen tree limb while outdoors.

The Northern Panhandle of West Virginia also sustained high winds and hail as a result of the storm with widespread tree damage. About 32,000 customers in the region lost power, particularly around Wheeling.

The high winds continued northward into Upstate New York late in the evening of September 14. Widespread damage, mostly to trees and power lines, was reported. In New York State, over 100,000 customers were reported without power. The hardest hit area was around Rochester, where over half of the outages were reported.

== Canada ==
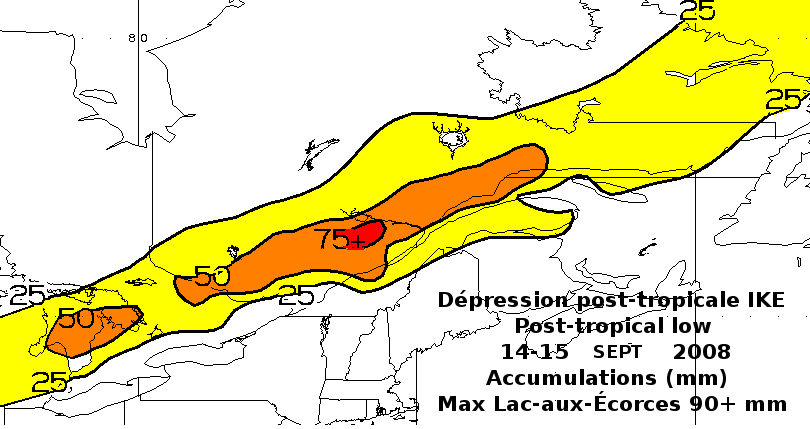
Rainfall accumulations in Canada

In Ontario, Ike's remnants brought a record amount of rain on Sunday, September 14, in the Windsor region. It was closely following a slow-moving frontal system that had drenched the city the day before, dumping 75.2 mm (2.96 in) of rain and breaking the old record of 39.1 mm (1.54 in) in 1979, according to Environment Canada. Most damage in the Windsor area with Ike was confined to downed power lines and toppled tree branches with the wind gusts reaching 80 km/h (50 mph), with spotty street flooding that made driving completely treacherous in some areas. Highways were washed out in the Bruce Peninsula, and trees were uprooted in London, Ontario. The storm continued to cause wind and rain damage as it continues east along the St. Lawrence River leaving around 25,000 customers without electricity, especially in Belleville, Brockville, Bancroft, Peterborough, Bowmanville, Huntsville and Timmins.

In the province of Quebec, regions to the north of the Saint Lawrence River received 50 to 70 mm (1.97 to 2.76 in) of rainfall (Hautes-Laurentides, Haute-Mauricie, Réserve faunique des Laurentides, Saguenay-Lac-Saint-Jean, Charlevoix and Côte-Nord). Maximum rainfall was recorded between Lac-St-Jean and the Réserve faunique des Laurentides with a station recording more than 90 mm (3.54 in) of rain Along the river, the amount was more in the 10 and 30 mm (0.39 and 1.18 in) range, except in Quebec City area which received almost 50 mm (1.97 in), most of it between 7:00 p.m. and 8:00 p.m. This rain caused small inundations, storm drain overflows, and caused one major highway to close. In Montreal, high humidity levels pushed by the system caused electrical malfunction one of the lines of the subway, stranding commuters. High winds up to 78 km/h (48.47 mph) caused, at their worst, over 25,000 households to lose electricity in Montreal, Laval, Estrie and Montérégie and when it reached the Magdalen Islands, it had enough strength to cause a sail boat, the Océan, to sink. Its six passengers were rescued by a helicopter of the Canadian Coast Guard.

The "Ike Spike" in gasoline prices was quite severe in Canada, with gas prices rising anywhere from 15 to 20 cents per liter.

== See also ==
- Hurricane Ike
- Effects of Hurricane Ike in Texas
