= Slow Joe Doyle =

American baseball pitcher (1881–1947)

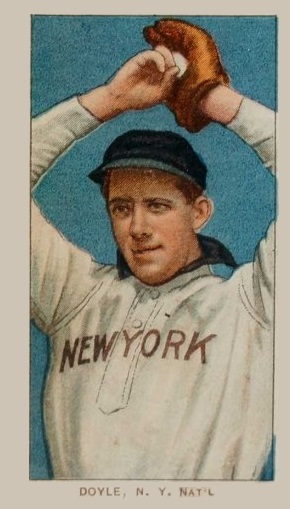
- American Tobacco Company incorrectly identified Doyle as a National League pitcher in this T206 baseball card issued in 1909
- Pitcher
- Born: August 25, 1881; Clay Center, Kansas, U.S.
- Died: November 21, 1947 (aged 66); Tannersville, New York, U.S.
- Batted: Right Threw: Right

MLB debut
- August 25, 1906, for the New York Highlanders

Last MLB appearance
- June 25, 1910, for the Cincinnati Reds

MLB statistics
- Win–loss record: 22–21
- Earned run average: 2.85
- Strikeouts: 209
- Stats at Baseball Reference

Teams
- New York Highlanders (1906–1910); Cincinnati Reds (1910)

Judd Bruce Doyle (September 15, 1881 – November 21, 1947) was an American right-handed Major League Baseball pitcher from 1906 to 1910 for the New York Highlanders and Cincinnati Reds. Doyle got his nickname "Slow Joe" early in his baseball career because he was a very slow working pitcher. He would take a lot of time between pitches, often stalling for notable amounts of time.

== Minor league career ==
Upon graduation from Clay Center High School in May 1901, Doyle began pitching in Ellsworth, Kansas. He caught the eye of Ted Sullivan, who recruited him for the Fort Worth Panthers of the Class D Texas League in 1902. In 1902, he also pitched for the Southern Association's New Orleans Pelicans, going 21–18 between his two squads.

In 1903, he and Ernie Baker formed a one-two punch that pitched the Baton Rouge Red Sticks to a 74–42 record, and the Cotton States League championship. The 1904 squad sputtered to a 49–63 record, however, and partway through the season, Doyle departed the team with an 8–9 record. Shortly afterwards, he began pitching for the Class B Central League Wheeling Stogies. On August 21, 1906, Wheeling sold his contract to the New York Highlanders.

== New York Highlanders ==
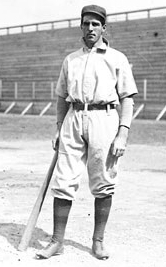
Doyle at South Side Park in 1909

He wants eight to ten days between the games in which he works. He is a slow chap, anyhow. He claims that his arm needs rest. He is one of the greatest pitchers there is.

— Jack Chesbro in Baseball Magazine (February 1910)

Doyle shutout the Cleveland Naps in his major league debut on August 25, 1906. He followed this with a shutout of the Washington Senators on August 30. He was the first 20th century pitcher to throw a shutout in each of his first two starts. It had been accomplished only twice before he did it and has since been accomplished 11 times. Only three American League pitchers have thrown shutouts in their first two big league appearances since Doyle did it. Over the remainder of the season, Doyle appeared in seven more games, losing one.

The following season Doyle went 11–11 with a 2.65 earned run average in 29 games (23 starts). He completed 15 games, and his three home runs allowed were the fifth most in the league. His 4.37 strikeouts per nine innings ratio was the sixth best in the league.

In 1908, Doyle was the Highlanders' opening day starter. However, for the rest of the season he appeared in only 11 more games, starting only four. He went 1–1 with a 2.63 ERA. He appeared in 17 games in 1909, making 15 starts. He went 8–6 with a 2.58 ERA, throwing three shutouts.

Doyle took the losses in his first start of the 1910 season. Though he pitched effectively through seven innings, the Philadelphia Athletics plated five runs in their final at bat. In his next start, Doyle faced nine batters, and retired just one, giving up five hits and two walks. He made one more appearance for the Highlanders against the Boston Red Sox on May 9.

== Cincinnati Reds ==
On May 31 the Cincinnati Reds purchased his contract for $2,000. He was relegated to "mop up duty" with the Reds, closing five games, all losses.

Despite starting out as a promising young pitcher, Doyle won only 22 games in his five-year career. He lost 21 games, and he posted an ERA of 2.85. In 75 appearances (50 starts), he walked 147 batters and struck out 209. As a batter, he hit .163 in 135 career at-bats.

== Personal life ==
Doyle married Mary Louise Lackey in 1910. They had three sons and lived in Tannersville, New York, where Doyle owned Doyle's Garage automobile repair shop. He died of a heart attack in Tannersville on November 21, 1947, at the age of 66, and was buried at the Evergreen Cemetery in Tannersville.

== T206 baseball card set ==
Doyle was one of 392 baseball players featured on a Cigarette card issued by the American Tobacco Company in cigarette and loose tobacco packs from 1909 to 1911. Sixty years after the card was first issued, baseball card collector Larry Fritsch noticed that there were two different versions of the Doyle card. One mistakenly stating that he played for 'N.Y. NAT'L', and a second that simply said 'N.Y.' Presumably, the printer mixed Joe up with Larry Doyle, who played for the New York Giants in the National League. Upon realizing his error, the printer merely removed the NAT'L from the caption and printed corrected versions of the card. While the corrected version of the card is fairly common, there are believed to be only eight authentic error cards in existence.
