= Effects of Hurricane Ike in Texas =

Hurricane Ike
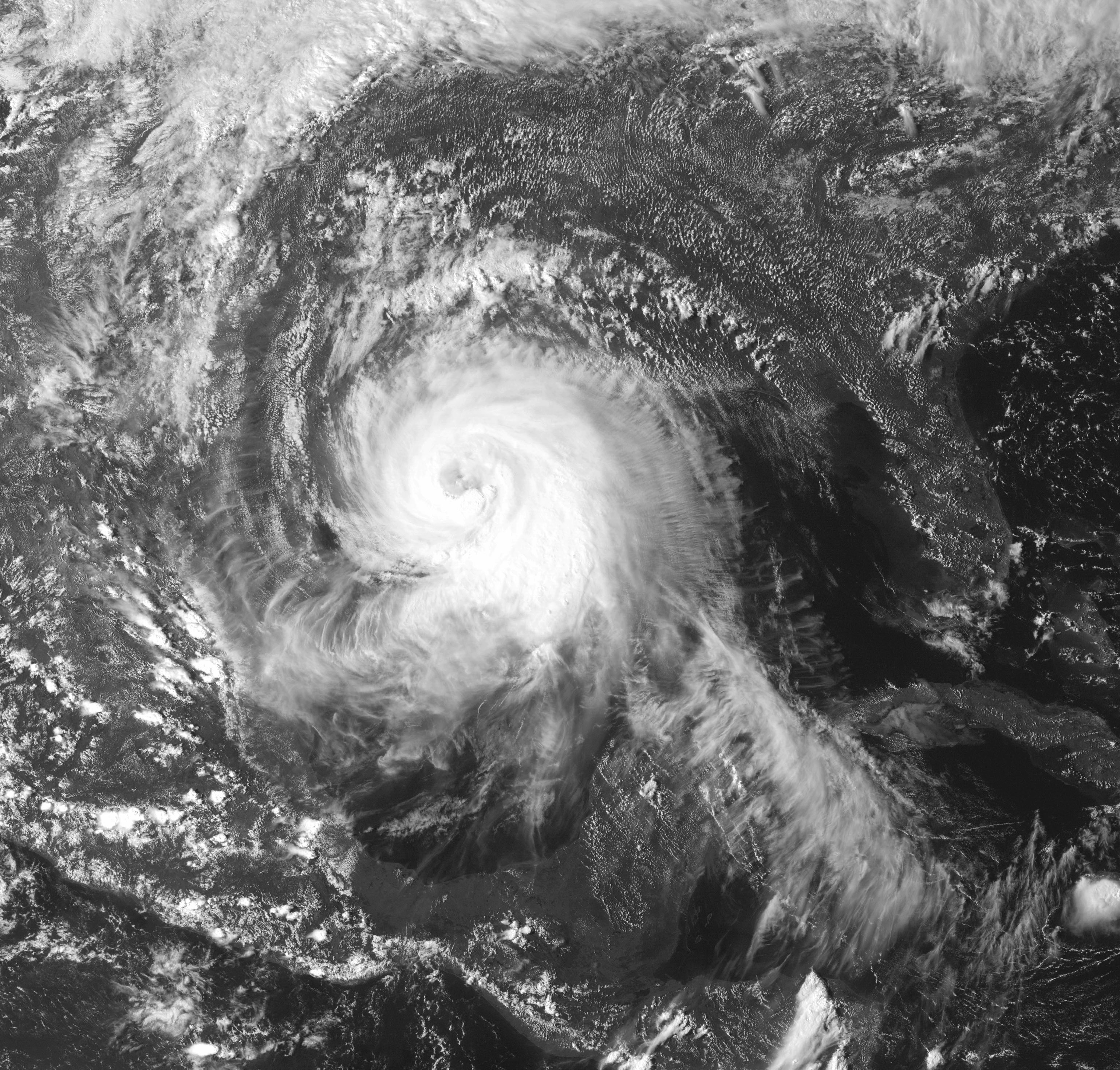
- Satellite image of Hurricane Ike on September 12 as it approached Texas

Category 2 hurricane
- 1-minute sustained (SSHWS/NWS)
- Highest winds: 110 mph (175 km/h)
- Highest gusts: 130 mph (215 km/h)

Overall effects
- Fatalities: 84 total
- Damage: $30 billion (2008 USD)
- Areas affected: East Texas (especially Galveston, Bolivar Peninsula, Gilchrist)
- Part of the 2008 Atlantic hurricane season

Hurricane Ike caused major destruction in Texas with crippling and long-lasting effects, including death, widespread damage, and impacts to the price and availability of oil and gas. Hurricane Ike also had a long-term impact on the U.S. economy. Making landfall over Galveston as a Category 2 hurricane, at 2:10 a.m. CDT on September 13, 2008, Hurricane Ike caused extensive damage in Texas, with sustained winds of 110 mph (180 km/h), a 22 ft (6.7 m) storm surge, and widespread coastal flooding.

More than 140,000 residents in the Texas Gulf Coast danger zones in Ike's path had failed to evacuate, partly due to fears of multi-hour traffic jams as during Hurricane Rita, but over 940 were rescued from rising waters, and nearly 2,000 rescued afterward. As of December 27, 2008, 37 people are known to have died in Texas due to Ike while hundreds are still missing.

The storm had come ashore hours before daybreak with 110-mph (175 km/h) winds and towering waves, pushing boats ashore, smashing many houses, flooding thousands of homes, knocking out windows in Houston's skyscrapers, uprooting trees, and cutting electric power to millions of customers (estimates range from 2.8 million to 4.5 million customers) for weeks or months.

Some people survived by punching holes in attics, climbing to rooftops or trees, using nearby boats, or floating on debris until reaching solid ground.

Afterward, an estimated 100,000 homes had been flooded in Texas, and numerous boats washed ashore. Galveston was declared uninhabitable, and Houston imposed a week-long nighttime curfew due to limited electric power.

== Hurricane preparations ==
On September 8, Texas State Governor Rick Perry declared 88 Texas state counties a disaster area in preparation for Hurricane Ike, expected to hit the Texas coast as early as Saturday morning, which included placing 7,500 Texas Military Forces troops on standby. The Texas County of Brazoria called for voluntary evacuation and Matagorda County called for mandatory evacuation as did the County of Brazoria for zip code 77541 and the city of Lake Jackson. Galveston, parts of southern Houston and areas south of the city and near the Texas coast were under a mandatory evacuation order starting at noon September 11.

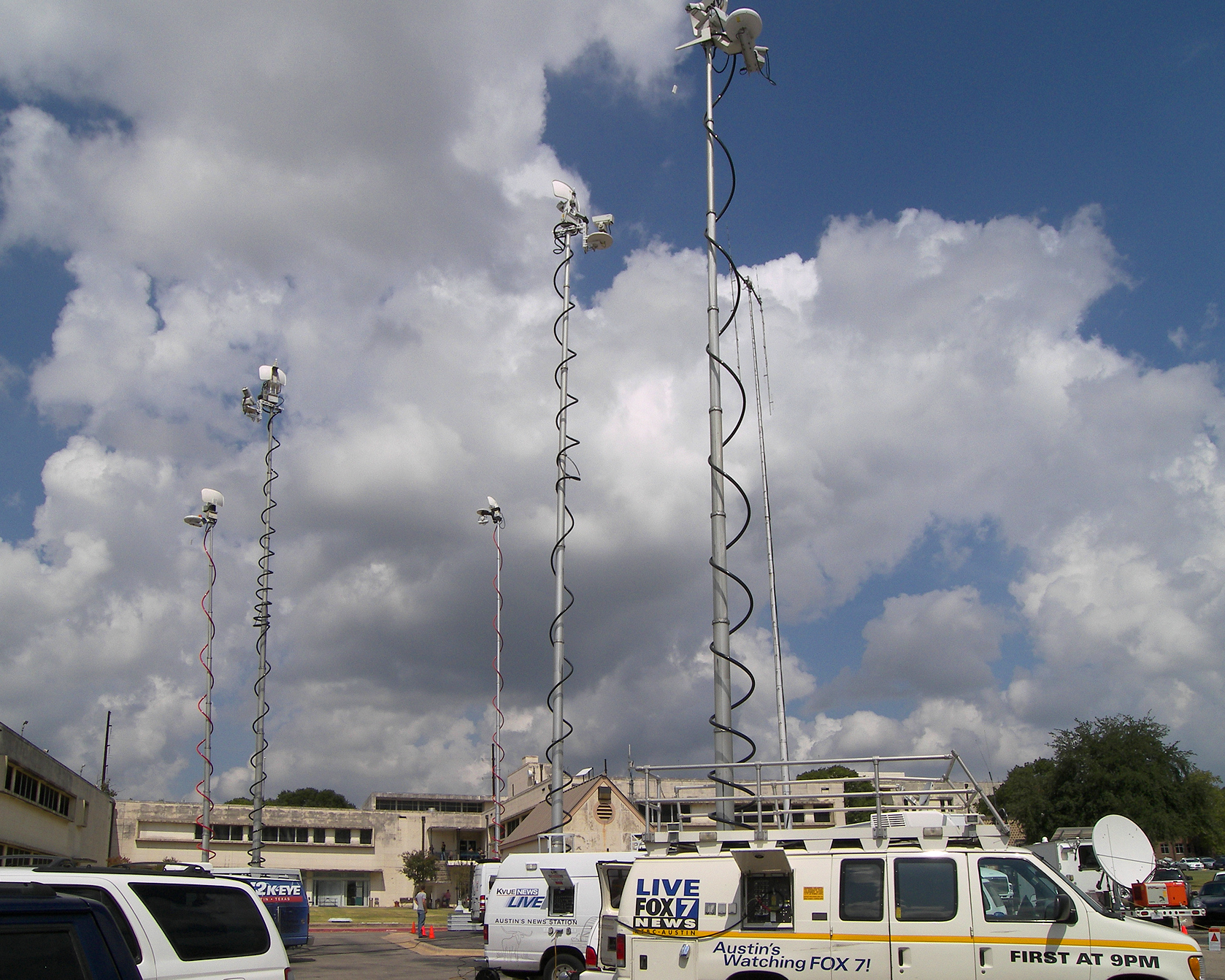
News vans at the Texas Department of Public Safety in Austin for a news conference about Hurricane Ike. The state's emergency operation center is located in the DPS building.

On September 10, U.S. President George W. Bush made an emergency declaration for Texas in advance of Hurricane Ike, making more federal help available for preparations and evacuations.

State rural water associations activated mutual aid networks to prepare for the landfall of Hurricane Hanna and Hurricane Ike while still providing assistance to areas impacted by Hurricane Gustav. The Texas Rural Water Association held meetings with state agencies on Tuesday, September 9, to plan for landfall along the Texas gulf coast.

On September 11, forecasting models began to show Ike making landfall just south of Galveston. City Manager Steve LeBlanc late Wednesday issued a mandatory evacuation order for the low lying west end of Galveston Island. Later, the mandatory evacuation order was extended to the entire island of Galveston, as well as low-lying areas around Houston, Texas. Mandatory evacuations were not restricted to the Houston and Galveston areas only. Mandatory evacuations were also ordered for Jefferson, Orange, and Chambers counties located east of Houston. Additionally, mandatory evacuations were ordered for residents with special needs and those registered with 211 in Jasper and Newton counties. Voluntary evacuations were in effect for Hardin and Tyler as well as the remainder of Newton and Jasper counties.

Also on September 11, at 8:19 p.m. (CDT), the National Weather Service in Houston/Galveston, TX issued a strongly worded bulletin, regarding storm surge along the shoreline of Galveston Bay. The bulletin advised residents living in single-family homes in some parts of coastal Texas may face "certain death" if they do not heed orders to evacuate. Reports said as many as 40 percent of Galveston's citizens may have not paid attention to the warnings. It was feared to be much the same in Port Arthur.

The prices of crude oil and gas increased in the expectation of damage to some of the numerous oil refineries along the South Texas coast, or at least delays in production from the oil and gas platforms in the Gulf of Mexico.

== Surge measurements ==
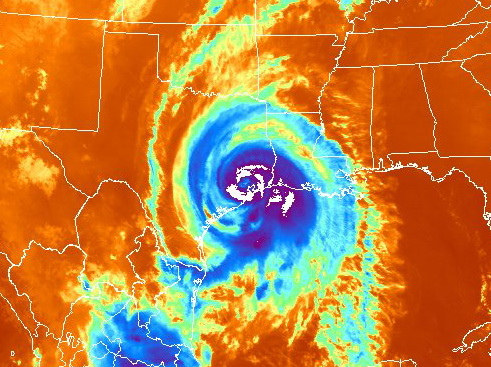
Satellite image map of Hurricane Ike after landfall on the Texas Coast.

Landfall had been predicted near Freeport, Texas, by the National Hurricane Center, as of Wednesday, September 10, 2008. However, the actual landfall was further east, over the east end of Galveston Island (near Texas City, TX), with the eye centered over Galveston Bay. Because some winds blew from the north at Galveston, water was pushed back out into the Gulf, and the actual storm surge there was muted to 19 ft (5.8 m), rather than the original prediction of over 25 ft (7.6 m) as with a west-end landfall, which would have pushed more water into Galveston Bay, being a channel bay.

As of September 13, 2008, the highest storm surge had been noted at Sabine Pass at 22 ft (6.7 m), the highest surge ever recorded at that station, and Ike also brought on the record for greatest storm surge ever seen with any Category 2 hurricane. However, Bolivar Peninsula, at the entrance to Galveston Bay, was nearer to the eastern side of the eye. The morning high tide (on 2008-09-13), adding 2.3 ft (0.70 m), occurred at 4:14 am CDT at the Galveston Bay entrance. The total eastern storm tide was then nearly 16 ft (4.9 m) by landfall at 2:10 am, with higher waves on top.

== Aftermath ==
On the night of September 13, 2008, the eye of Hurricane Ike approached the Texas coast near Galveston Bay, making landfall at 2:10 a.m. CDT over the east end of Galveston Island(near Texas City).

People in low-lying areas who had not heeded evacuation orders, in single-family one- or two-story homes, had been warned by the weather service that they "faced certain death" in the overnight storm surge.

In regional Texas towns, electrical power began failing before 8 p.m. CDT, leaving more than 3 million people without power. In addition, grocery store shelves in the Houston area were left empty.

Rainfall estimates indicated that 2-day rainfall totals from mid-day Friday through mid-day Saturday exceeded 20 in (51 cm) in parts of both northern Harris County and southern Montgomery County, with a multi-county area receiving at least 10 inches (25 cm) of rainfall.

=== Bolivar Peninsula and southern Chambers County ===
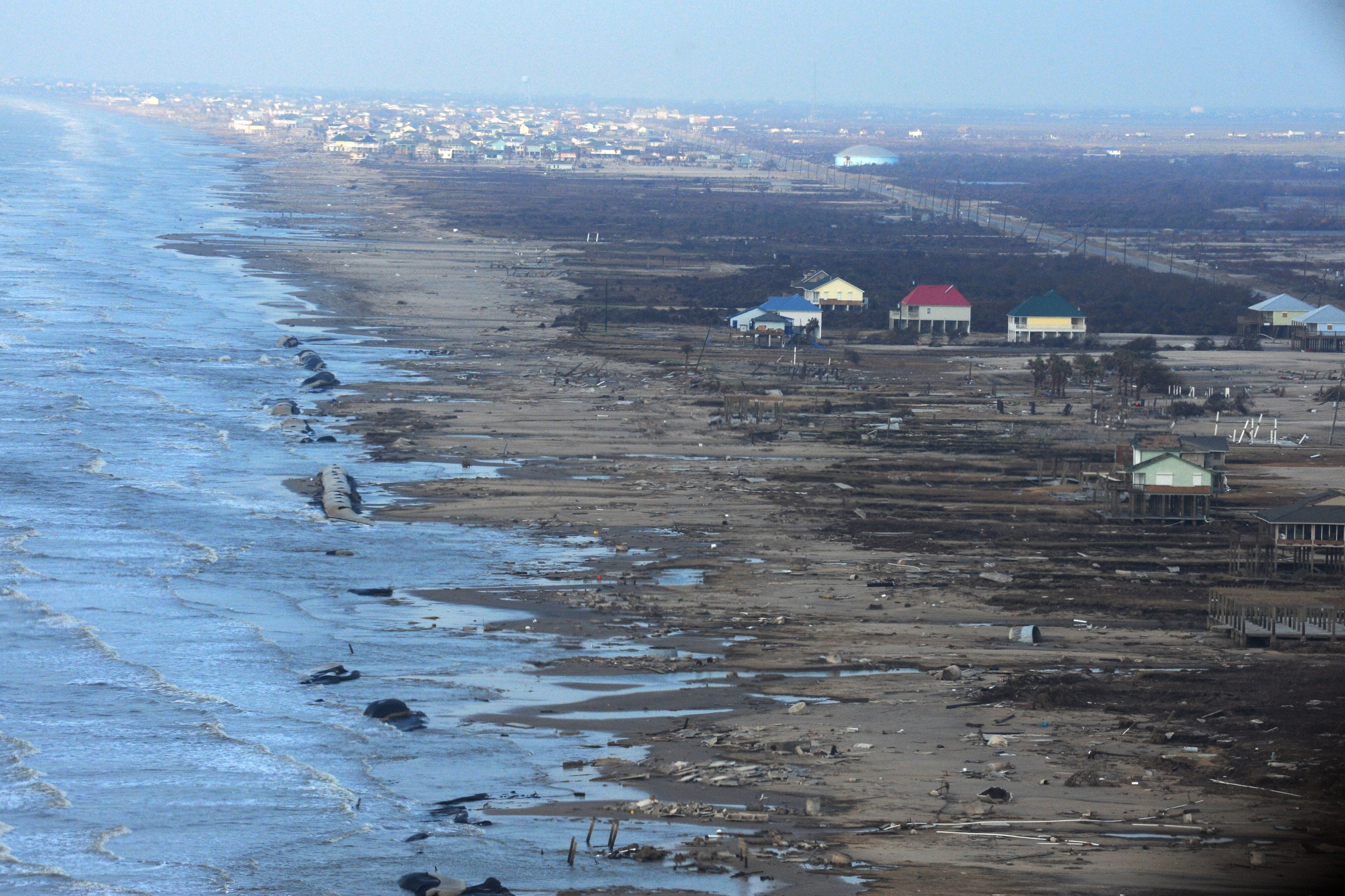
Bolivar Peninsula beach devastation from Hurricane Ike

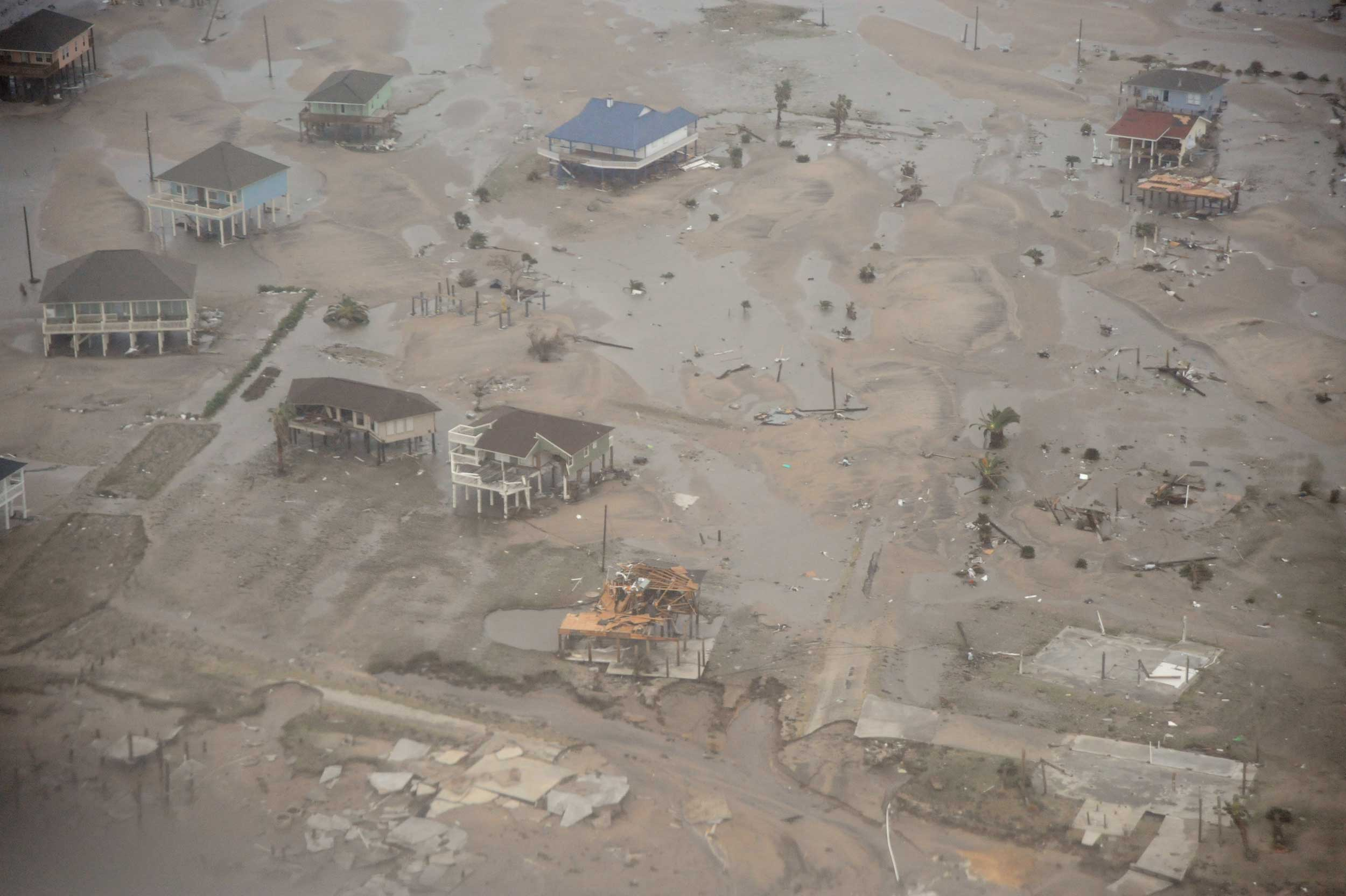
Bolivar Point - September 13, 2008

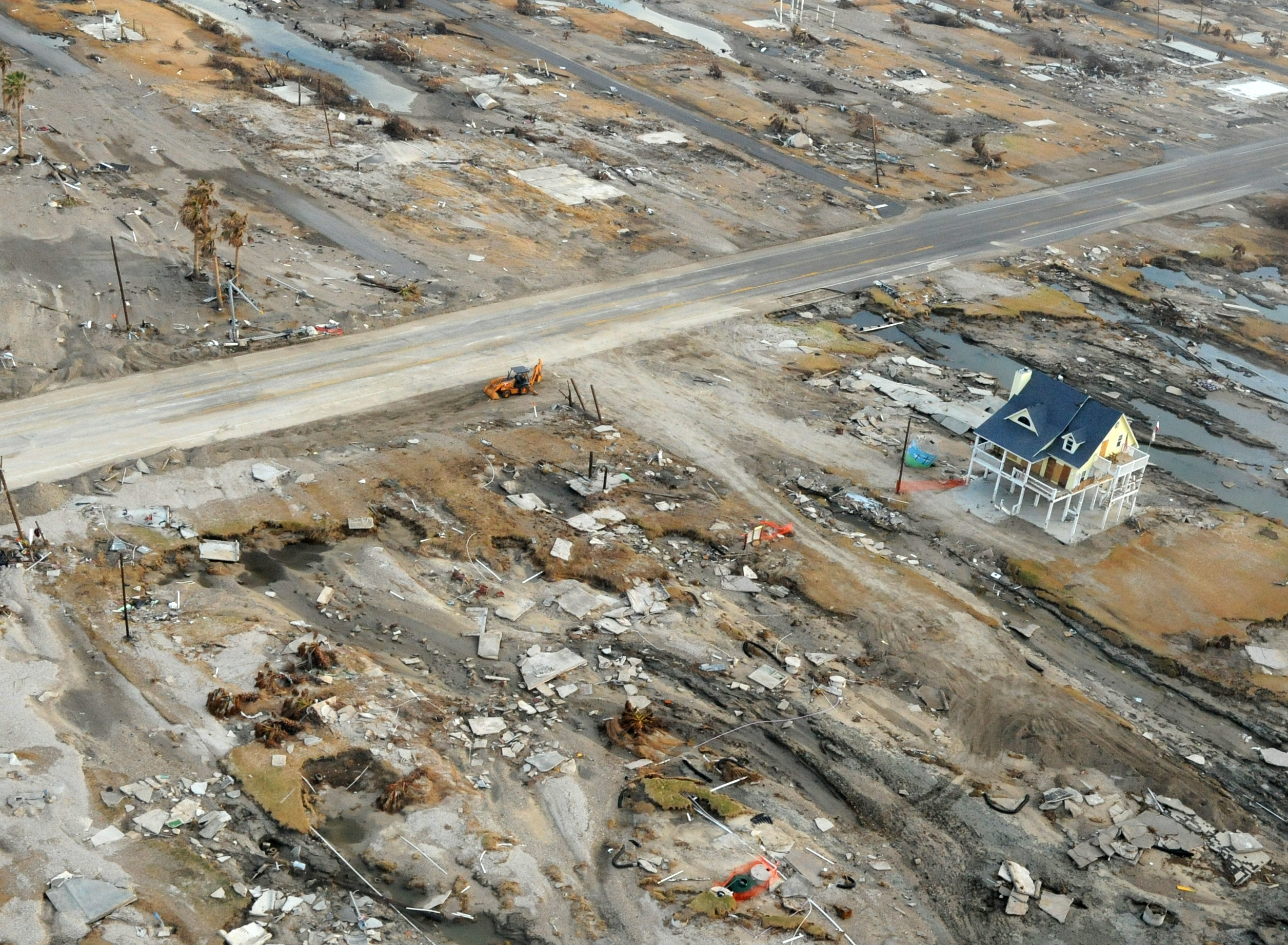
Damage from Ike in Gilchrist

Bolivar Peninsula got the strong side of the storm; as it located just east across the water from the landfall site on Galveston Island, it had been submerged under the storm tide. Water from the storm surge was over the first floor of many houses.

Most, if not all of the communities previously located on the Bolivar Peninsula, which together with Galveston Island separates Galveston Bay from the Gulf of Mexico, were utterly devastated. Based on an extensive aerial survey conducted on the afternoons of Saturday, September 13 and Sunday, September 14, very little remains west of the community of High Island. The area of total or near-total destruction includes Caplen, Port Bolivar, and the area surrounding Gregory Park. Most, if not all of the structures that had been situated along the length of SH 87 west of High Point, as well as Loop 108 on the western edge of Bolivar, were destroyed.

Crystal Beach, a populous community located roughly at the midpoint of the peninsula, was submerged and destroyed; waves and wind pounded houses, and even some houses elevated on 14-ft (4.3–m) stilts rolled into the waters. The tiny beachfront community of Gilchrist, which sat astride the north-facing Rollover Pass, was completely swept away, save for only a few homes. One of these homes, the only one in its neighborhood to remain intact (although it was rendered uninhabitable), attracted widespread media interest after images of it began to appear in newspapers and on television. At least six bodies were found in an extensive search.

Two flood water sensors in Chambers County, Texas, survived Ike's storm surge, while those on eastern Bolivar Peninsula were left inoperable during the hurricane. Along the eastern shores of Galveston Bay surge heights were measured at 16.9 ft (5.2 m) and a measurement along SH 124 measured 17.0 ft (5.2 m). Massive amounts of surge carried debris, largely from Bolivar Peninsula and southern Chambers County were left along the northern coast of Rollover Pass.

There is controversy whether houses near the beach are allowed to be rebuilt if they are destroyed by such storms.

=== Galveston ===
In Galveston, by 4 p.m. CDT (2100 UTC) on September 12, the rising storm surge began overtopping the 17 ft (5.2 m) Galveston Seawall, which faces the Gulf of Mexico; waves had been crashing along the seawall earlier, from 9 a.m. CDT. Although Seawall Boulevard is elevated above the shoreline, many areas of town slope down behind the seawall to the lower elevation of Galveston Island.

The historic Balinese Room, a former mafia-run nightclub on a pier that had extended 600 ft (180 m) into the Gulf of Mexico and had withstood many serious storms, was swept away as Ike's eye crossed over the eastern half of Galveston Island. The elevated structure, a pier, which had hosted performers ranging from Frank Sinatra, Bob Hope and George Burns to Groucho Marx and Sammy Davis, Jr., had recently been renovated and returned to profitability after years of neglect and disrepair, and was listed on the National Register of Historic Places.

None of the many wooden piers that gave Galveston much of its unique character survived the landfall of Hurricane Ike. In addition to the Balinese Room, Murdoch's, Hooters and the 61st Street Pier were all completely destroyed. Murdoch's Pier was rebuilt and reopened in October 2009, while Hooters Galveston (housed in the former Ocean Grill building) was not rebuilt; the site remains vacant as of 2011. A new Hooters was reopened in November 2017 off 61st Street south of I-45 instead. The 61st Street Pier was rebuilt and reopened in 2010. Seawall Boulevard, which runs the entire length of the seawall several meters above the popular beaches adjoining the Gulf, was littered with the debris of these and other structures.

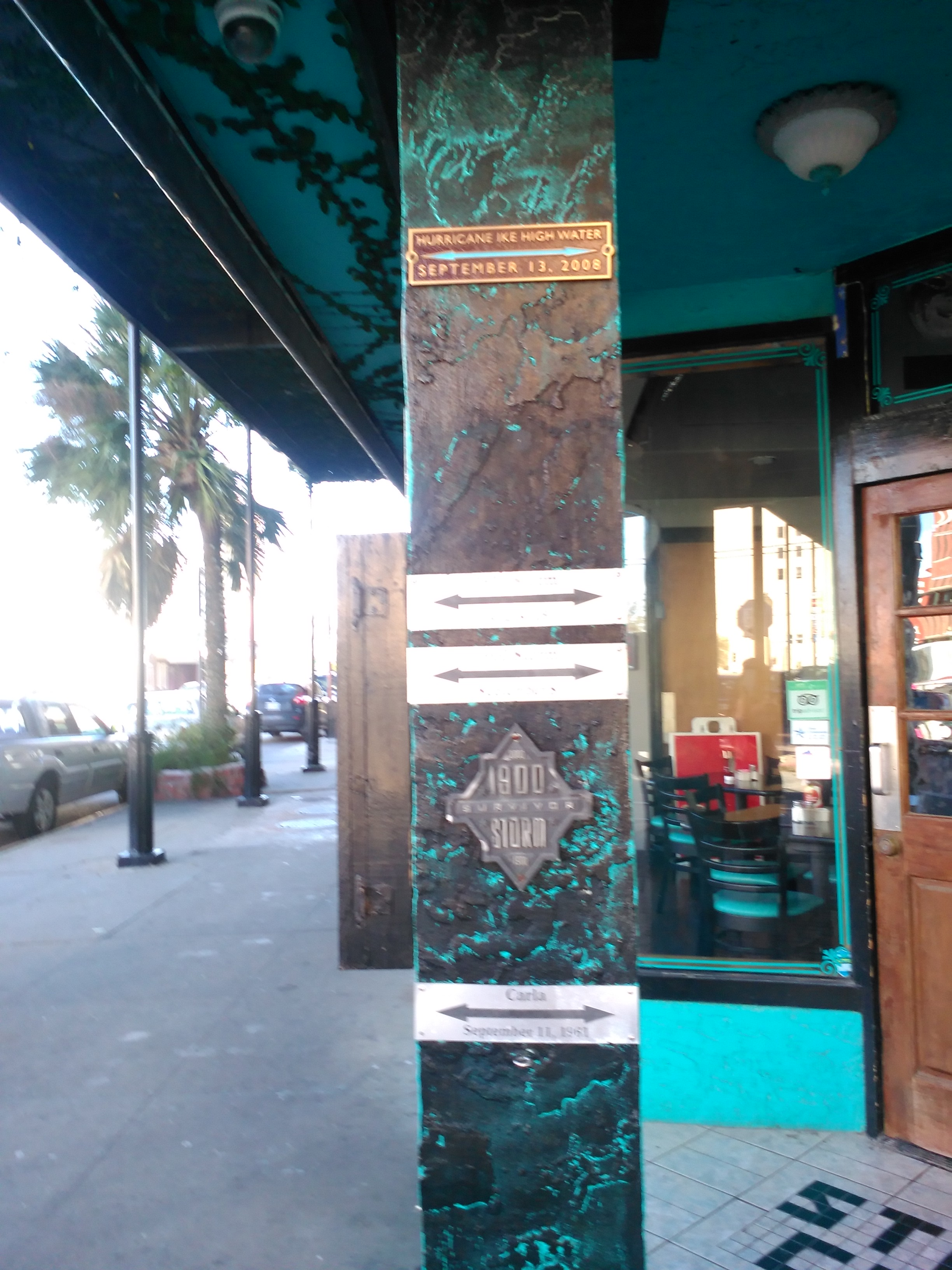
Sign showing the highest water level of Hurricane Ike in Galveston

The landmark Flagship Hotel, which sat on deep concrete pylons, was seriously damaged, but no one was injured, and while an early survey indicated the structure would be salvageable; however that proved to be untrue, and the hotel was demolished in 2011. Some of the hotel's siding was peeled off by the storm (this occurred during Hurricane Alicia in 1983), venting at least one top-floor guest suite to the open air, and the elevated ramp permitting vehicles to access the hotel's lower level from Seawall Boulevard fell into the Gulf.

The seemingly protected back side of the island also suffered heavy damage to tourist areas. The Lone Star Flight Museum suffered massive damage as the storm surge washed over the airport and though all the aircraft hangars (not just the museums) with about 8 ft (2.4 m) of water. All the airplanes, except those that flew out before the storm, were damaged from moderate to severe, but the worst was the complete destruction of the "Aviation Hall of Fame" with numerous personal items of aviation's greatest pioneers. Conversely, Moody Gardens was built with hurricane storms in mind with strong pyramid shaped structures very high above sea level, so it was able to withstand the worst of the storm and return to operation quickly.

The Galveston Island Trolley infrastructure was heavily damaged and operations were not restarted after the hurricane, and later suspended indefinitely. FEMA agreed to provide $200 million for repairs in the city. As of 2020 the line has yet to reopen.

The Galveston Railroad Museum suffered damage throughout its museum and exhibit grounds. Several railcars and locomotives were damaged by the hurricane's winds and flooding. Two historical EMD F7 locomotives were scrapped after being severely damaged. The museum's model railroad layout was also destroyed.

Even though there were advance evacuation plans, Mary Jo Naschke, spokesperson for the city of Galveston, estimated that (as of Friday morning) a quarter of the city's residents disregarded calls for them to evacuate, despite predictions that most of Galveston Island would suffer heavy flooding storm tide. By 6 p.m. Friday night, estimates varied as to how many of the 58,000 residents remained, but the figures of remaining residents were in the thousands.

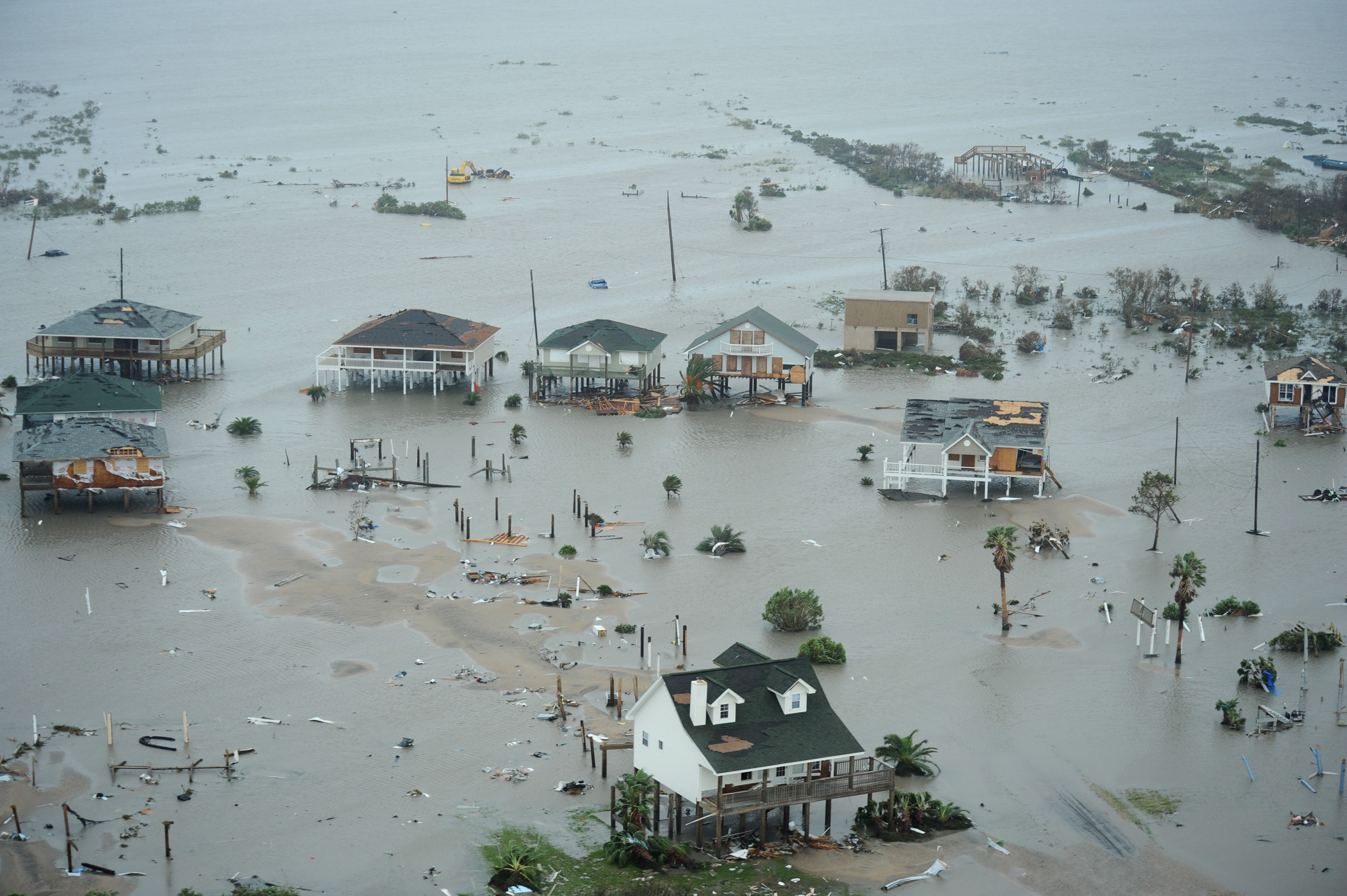
Galveston Island, viewed during a search and rescue mission

Some people survived by punching holes in attics and carried sick relatives away from the flood. On the 91st Street Pier, formerly a two-story structure resembling a house that extended 400 ft (120 m) into the Gulf, three persons opted to ride the storm out, despite a National Weather Service warning direly predicting that they faced "certain death" from what was expected to be up to a 24 ft (7.3 m) storm surge. Calling local emergency operators three hours ahead of Ike's landfall, they requested evacuation by Coast Guard personnel, as the entire length of the pier and the structure's first story had by that time fallen into the Gulf. They were informed that no one could rescue them at that time, due to the unacceptable risks their prospective rescuers would be subjected to. Weathering the storm huddled inside what remained of the pier's second floor, they were lifted to safety by a rescue helicopter late the following morning.

An early survey of Galveston Island, performed late Saturday, September 13 and Sunday, September 14, 2008, indicated that the entirety of the Island west of 11 Mile Road was entirely devastated, and that few structures on Galveston's western one-third had survived. This area of near-total destruction includes the communities of Bayou Vista and Jamaica Beach, as well as the Galveston Country Club and the Galveston Island State Park. The affected area previously included 1,000 structures, including single-family dwellings, commercial enterprises, and hotels and resorts. It is unknown how many residents may have ignored repeated calls to evacuate, or what became of those who decided to remain in Galveston's vulnerable West End.

Electric power failed in Galveston around 7:45 p.m. CDT. Widespread flooding included downtown Galveston: such as 6 ft (1.8 m) deep inside the Galveston County Courthouse, and the University of Texas Medical Branch at Galveston was flooded. Five people have died on Galveston Island - two of them drowned and three of them were due to natural causes.

In transferring survivors out of town, Galveston officials used Ball High School, which was used as a "shelter of last resort" for evacuees, to be a center for FEMA. More than 200 residents stayed at the school shelter, and hundreds more ate meals there. Buses were brought in on Sunday to take residents from that shelter, and others who wanted to leave the island, to a shelter in San Antonio.

On the day of landfall, police were stopping travelers at La Marque, 4 mi (6.4 km) north of Galveston, and making them exit the highway. I-45 at La Marque had been closed because boats and parts of wrecked piers were strewn throughout floodwaters blocking the road.

Chris Terrill filmed the impact of Ike on Galveston, in the second part of his three-part series Nature's Fury. The film captured the evacuation, storm surge and 17-foot (5.2 m) waves overtopping the sea wall preceding the hurricane's arrival; before and after footage of the historic Balinese Room nightclub that was destroyed in the storm; scenes on the street during 100 mph (160 km/h) winds and lashing rain; and the devastation afterwards.

From a historical perspective, on September 8, 1900, the Great Galveston Hurricane came ashore on a path similar to Ike, bringing with it a storm surge that inundated most of Galveston Island: as a result, much of the city was destroyed and at least 6,000 people were killed in a few hours; afterward, the level of the island was raised an average of 4 ft (1.2 m), adding a high seawall 17 ft (5.2 m) to block incoming waves.

=== Houston ===
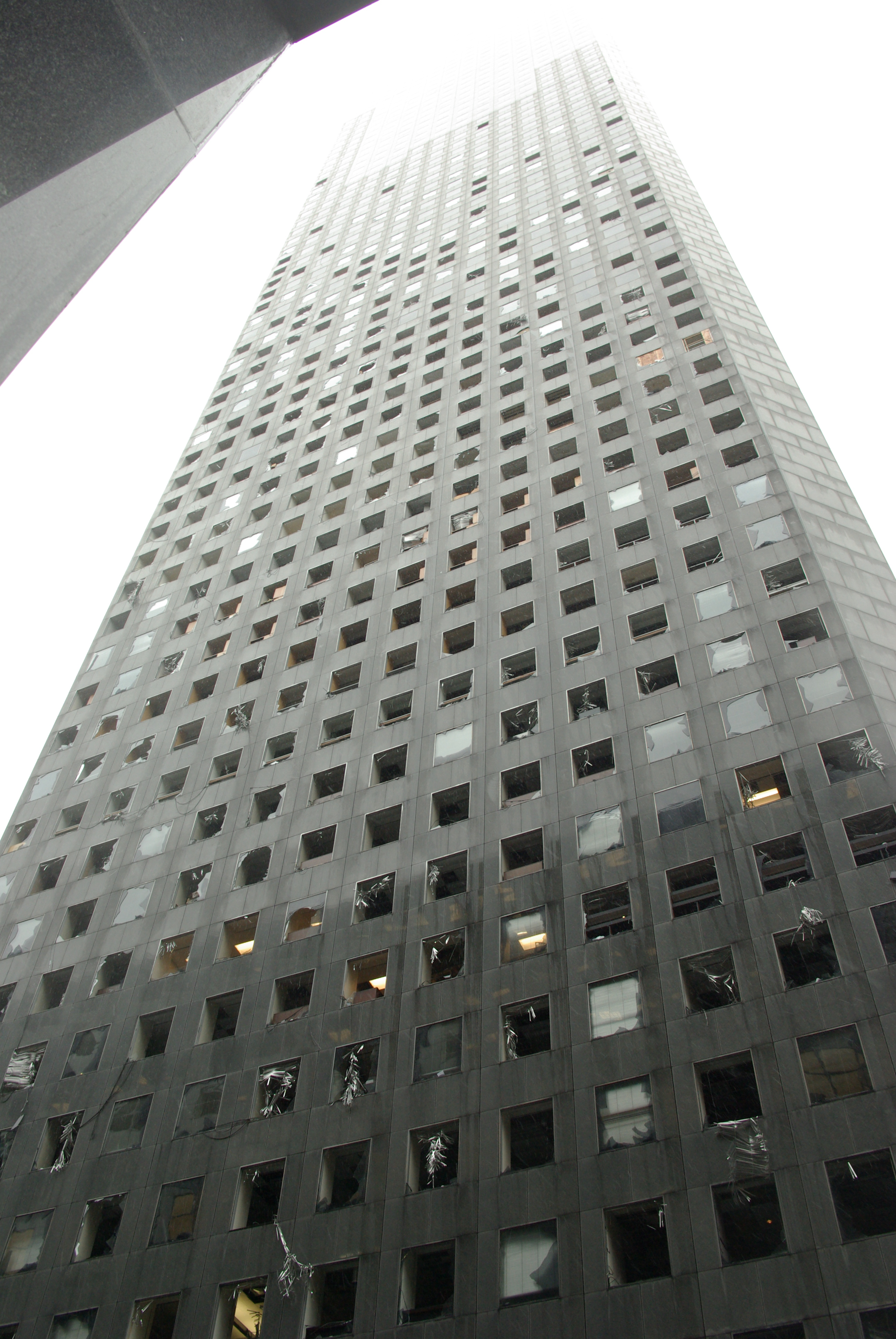
Windows were damaged on the JPMorgan Chase Tower.

In Houston, windows broke in downtown buildings such as the 75-story JPMorgan Chase Tower, and Reliant Stadium was damaged. according to a witness interviewed by Fox News, furniture from offices in the JPMorgan Chase building was blown out of the shattered windows and into the parking garage across the street. A fire partially burned Brennan's restaurant in downtown Houston, but workers were rescued. Many trees were uprooted, and bus stop shelters were mangled. The Houston Theater District was flooded.

Although electric power was out in most of the region, the lights remained on at the Texas Medical Center, a complex of about a dozen hospitals. At Memorial Hermann Hospital, patients were coming in with a variety of problems, including people who had run out of medicine or oxygen, or others who had cuts and bruises.

Based on information compiled by the US Centers for Disease Control, twenty-eight deaths in Harris County are attributed to the indirect effects of Ike, including illnesses, and accidents, such as carbon monoxide poisoning, fires, and tree cutting.

Hurricane Ike affected Houston Astros' late dash for Major League Baseball's playoffs, indefinitely postponing Friday and Saturday's games against the Chicago Cubs. The games were played in American Family Field in Milwaukee, and the Cubs swept the Astros. As a result, the Astros failed to qualify for the 2008 Major League Baseball postseason. In football, the Houston Texans were forced to postpone a game against the Baltimore Ravens, which also involved a Texans game against the Cincinnati Bengals being moved up a week.

Flights in and out of Houston's two major airports (Bush Intercontinental and Hobby) were suspended on Friday September 12, 2008, with plans to resume on the following Sunday. However, as of Sunday September 14, 2008, Intercontinental remained without power, but both airports planned to re-open Monday with limited service.

Due to large number of destroyed, damaged, or dysfunctional traffic lights, most Houston roads remained clogged two weeks after Ike hit. Many highway exits were jammed and caused a gridlock on highways as well, especially during rush hours. Many gas stations were out of service for a week because of no electricity to pump the gas. The few that functioned resulted in long lines and only once a week gasoline deliveries. This "hit and miss" to find gasoline led to the buying out of gasoline once it was delivered. Similarly there were long lines in most of the few open grocery stores, home repair stores, and restaurants.

=== Texas City ===
A Valero Energy Corp. spokesman, Bill Day, said that crews would soon get in to inspect the oil refineries in Houston and Texas City, which remained shut down on Saturday, September 13, 2008. Texas City (north of Galveston) was very near to the landfall site of Hurricane Ike. The Mainland Medical Center (off I-45) closed its doors on Saturday at 4 p.m. CDT, after water service was unavailable in the area. One death has been reported in Texas City, which was caused by a lack of dialysis treatment due to the storm's aftermath.

The beloved Texas City Dike, a manmade structure extending nearly five miles into the mouth of Galveston Bay, was overtopped and seriously damaged along with all structures built upon it. The dike, known to locals as "the world's longest manmade fishing pier," had stood for seven decades and was considered Texas City's primary defense against the devastation wrought by a powerful storm surge. An aerial survey late afternoon Sunday, September 14, revealed that the eastern and northern portions of Texas City, as well as San Leon were still substantially flooded. Substantial wind damage appeared to have been sustained by the Texas City Industrial Complex that borders Galveston Bay.

A few businesses, including some gasoline stations, convenience stores and fast food restaurants, were planning to re-open as early as Monday, September 15, 2008. Beginning Sunday, September 14, the Texas Military Forces began using the city's high school football stadium as a staging and relocation area used by Black Hawk helicopters, which were used to retrieve stranded citizens from Bolivar, Galveston and other area communities. Also on September 14, the Red Cross opened a disaster relief center in Texas City.

=== League City ===
In League City, the electric power went out, and CenterPoint Energy said it could take four weeks or more to restore power after the largest outage in the company's history. Residents who evacuated were allowed to return on September 16, 2008, and advised to bring back enough food for two weeks; a dusk-until-dawn curfew was in effect. Two deaths have been reported in League City, both due to natural causes indirectly caused by Ike.

=== Kemah, Seabrook, Taylor Lake Village and El Lago ===
House in Kemah, TX, that was struck by Hurricane Ike in 2008.

Kemah, about 35 mi (56 km) south of Houston, was without power and water, and still had 5 ft (1.5 m) of flooding on Saturday, September 13, 2008. SH 146 was closed at the FM 2094 intersection. There was a lot of debris on the roads, completely covering some lanes.

Severe damage occurred at the Kemah Boardwalk, the site of many popular restaurants and shops, as well as a small waterfront amusement park with various rides, including a carousel, kiddie train and Ferris wheel overlooking Galveston Bay. The entire first floor of Landry's seafood restaurant was demolished and swept away, as well as those of neighboring structures. The Boardwalk had received 4 million visitors per year. In an interview on local CBS affiliate KHOU-TV, the Boardwalk manager expressed confidence that despite such unprecedented devastation to the tourist attraction, the site would be rebuilt.

In Seabrook, most homes and businesses east of SH 146 (close to Galveston Bay) were flooded by storm surge, which included the Miramar subdivision and "Old Seabrook". Homes along Todville Rd (which parallels Galveston Bay) were washed away, or had their entire bottom floors gutted. SH 146 just north of the Kemah Bridge was completely inundated, causing boats and other debris to collect on the highway after the waters subsided. The Seabrook Waterfront district sustained substantial damage. The surge caused boats to float onto or very close to NASA Road 1 also destroyed boat docks and businesses along NASA Road 1 all the way to the Nassau Bay Hilton hotel.

=== Clear Lake and Nassau Bay ===
Near Clear Lake, where winds reportedly gusted over 100 mph, many people rode out the storm at the Nassau Bay Hilton, across from the NASA/JSC complex. The roof of the Mission Control Center of NASA's Johnson Space Center was damaged by Hurricane Ike, but there were no injuries and no major flooding. Along with the roof damage, there were branches and light poles on the ground, with minor damage to buildings and vehicles. There was also damage to hangars and awnings at NASA's Ellington Field, east of I-45. NASA has its own generators to provide electric power.

=== Baytown ===
Baytown, on the upper portion of Galveston Bay, was affected by the storm surge from Hurricane Ike. Homes in the Lakewood subdivision on the western side of Baytown on the bay sustained major flood damage. Many homes were eventually demolished because they were beyond repair. The Bayland Marina on the Waterfront District near SH 146 sustained major damage. All boats docked there were lost. Most of the boats were found along SH 146 or in the nearby subdivision. Hurricane Ike also caused the temporary shutting down of the Baytown ExxonMobil refinery.

=== Jefferson County ===
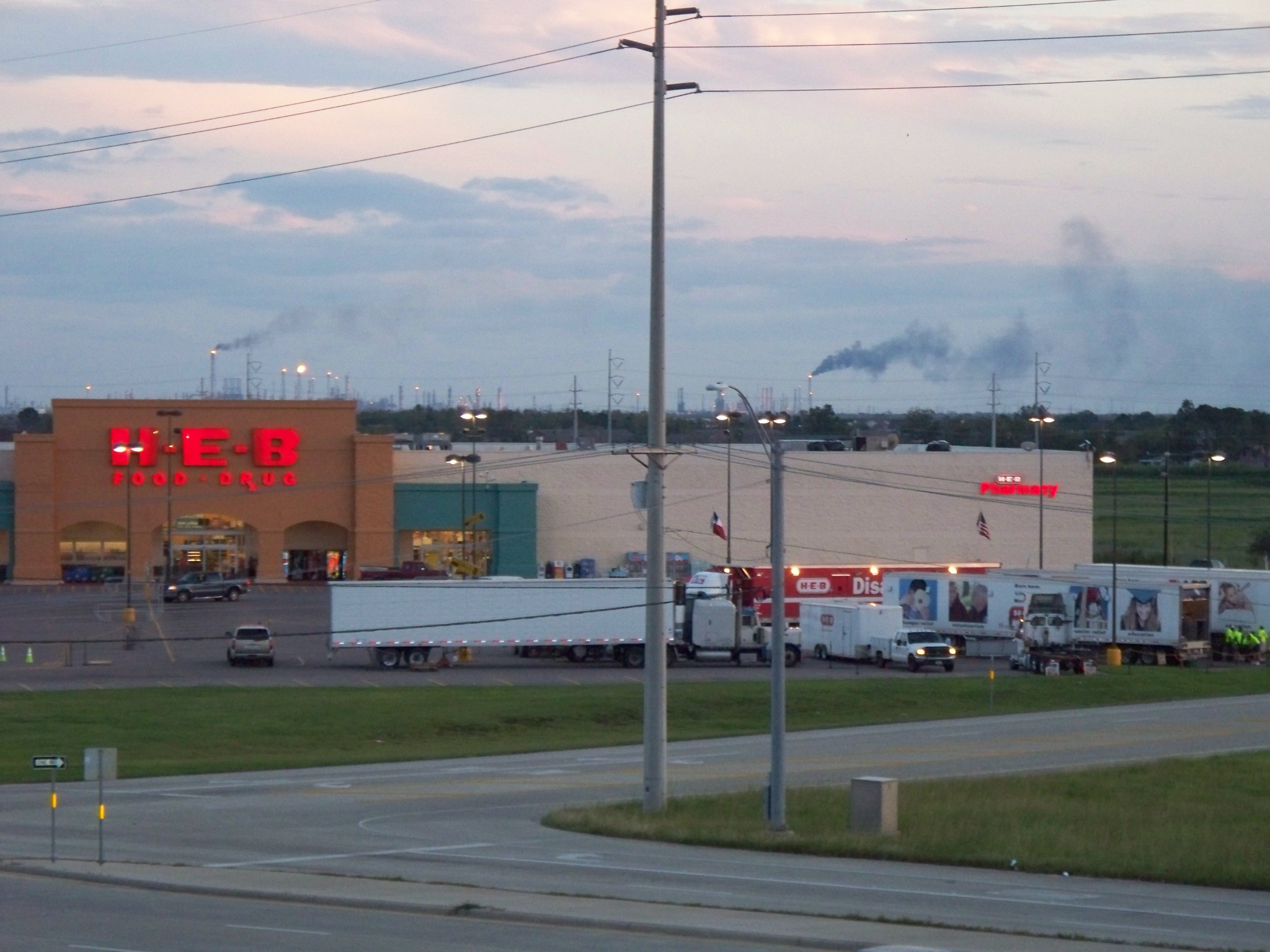
Recovery crews gather at an HEB Store while refineries in background flare due to shutdown in Port Arthur.

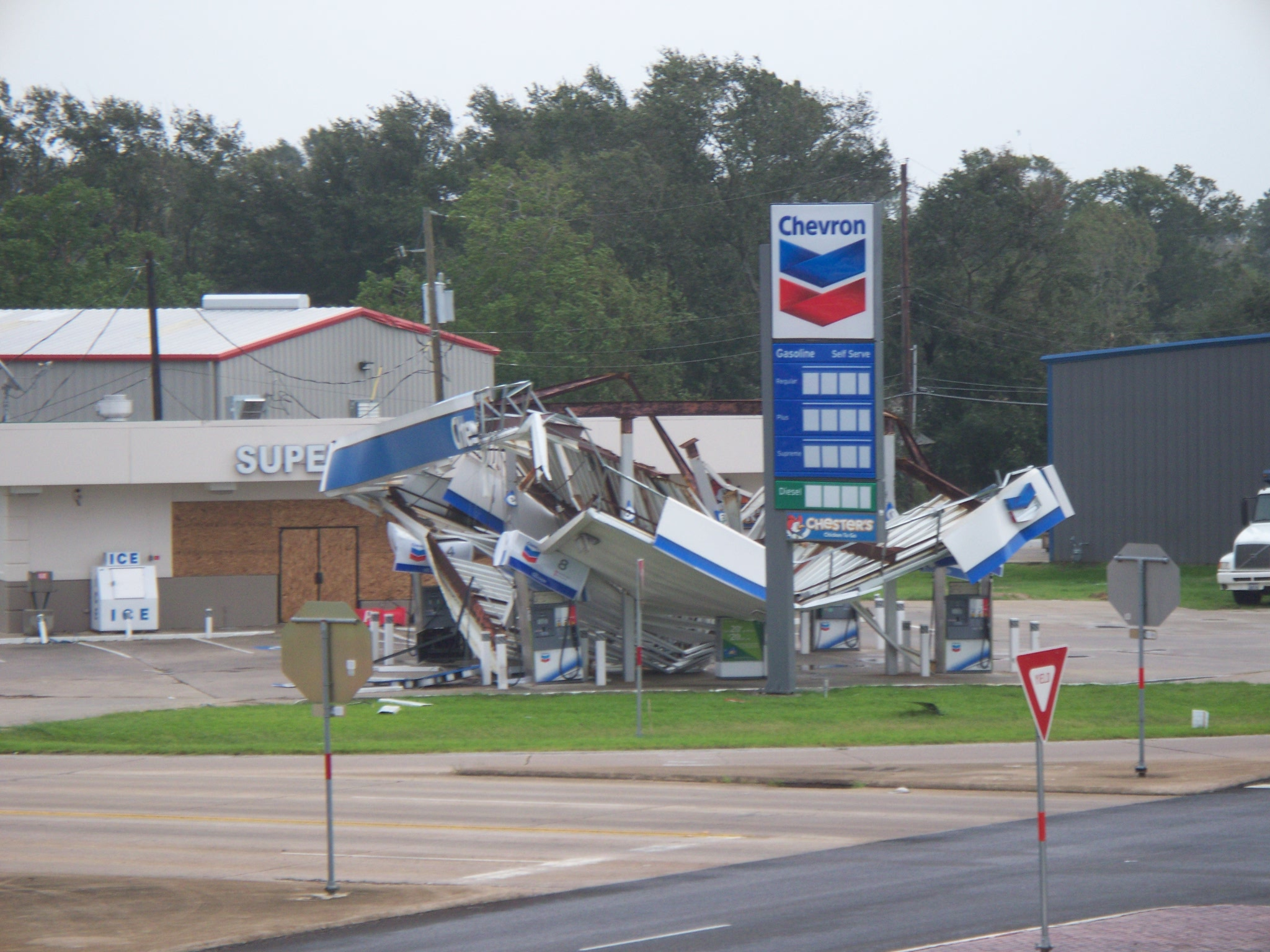
Gas station canopy damage near Nederland.

Like most of East Texas, the Beaumont and Port Arthur areas received winds at hurricane force. Ike's storm surge threatened the Port Arthur levees, and penetrated far enough inland to contaminate the water supply for Beaumont with salt water.

Hardest hit were rural areas of Jefferson County, including the unincorporated communities of LaBelle and Fannett. As of September 18, 4000 head of cattle were estimated dead, drowned by floods in the county, both from rain, and storm surge.

One fatality has been reported in extreme Southeast Texas related to Ike. It was as a result of a generator fire when power was out. Despite official assurances that this was the only Ike-related death in the area, rumors spread that large numbers of people died during the storm. This was fueled by the presence of refrigerated trailers outside a Beaumont funeral home. The funeral home had lost electrical service and was using the trailers to store bodies of people who died of natural causes until burials could be arranged.

=== Orange County ===
Damage was widespread and severe across Orange County. Storm surge almost completely flooded Bridge City, breached the levee at the Orange, and travelled up the Neches River to flood Rose City.

Orange received winds at hurricane force. Mayor Brown Claybar estimated about a third of the city of 19,000 people was flooded, anywhere from 6 in (15 cm) to 6 ft (1.8 m). He said about 375 people, of those who stayed behind during the storm, began to emerge, some needing food, water and medical care. Many dead fish littered streets and properties.

Bridge City Mayor Kirk Roccaforte estimated that only 14 homes (Amended later to some 34), in the city were unaffected by the surge. 10 of which were in the Oakview addition, 5 on Louise Street, and 5 on Lafitte Street. One resident on Louise Street who stayed made a video of the cresting serge. These homes were well above the 100 year storm surge flood plain. The piles of debris and waterlogged furniture placed outside homes by residents beginning to clean up led the mayor to say "The whole city looks like a flea market. During the post-storm cleanup, Bridge City residents found swimming pools had been occupied by jellyfish brought inland with the water. Three people were found dead in Orange County on September 29.

=== Other towns ===
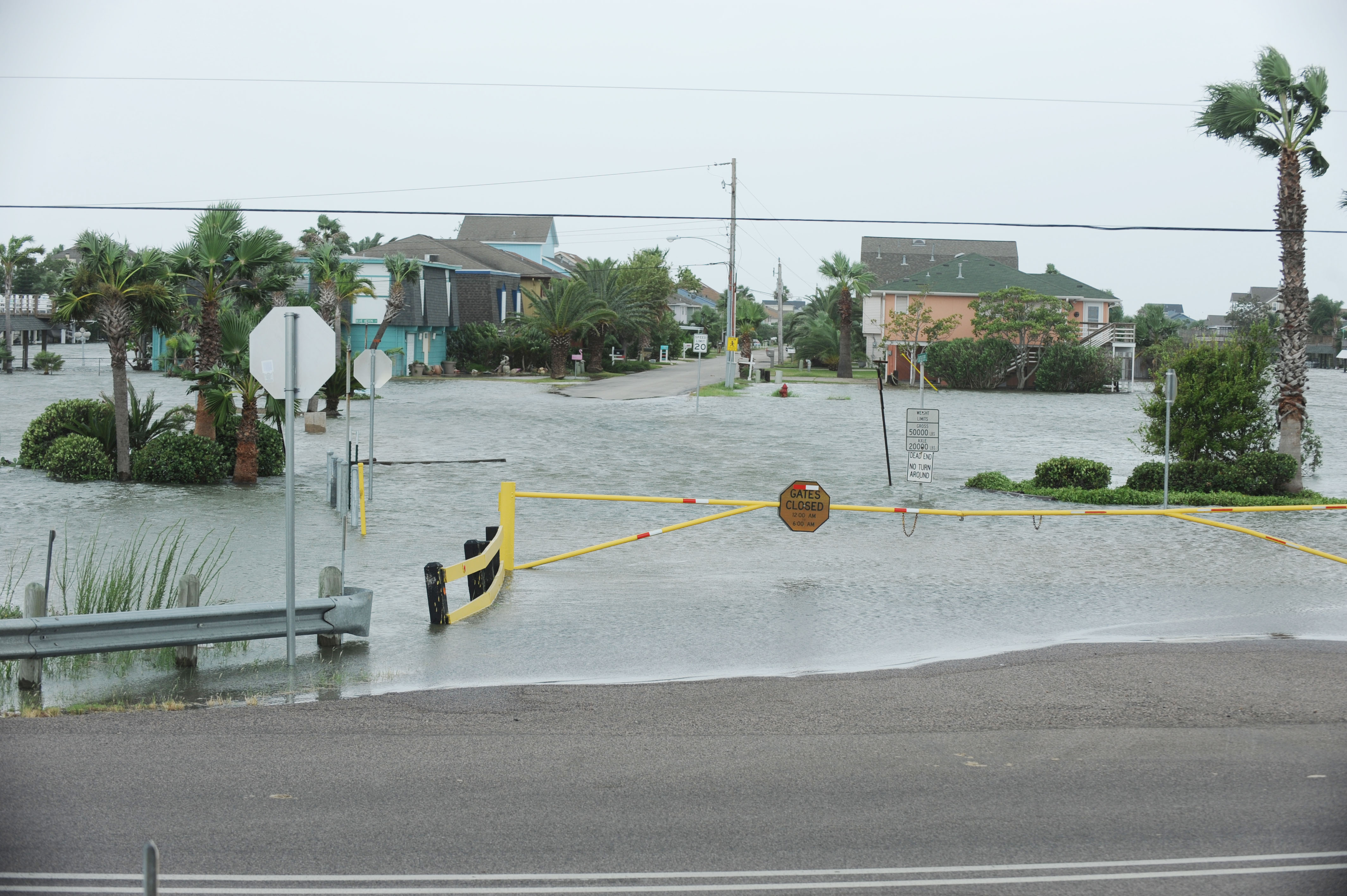
Flood waters begin to rise in a neighborhood of Bayou Vista.

One death was confirmed to have been Ike-related as a tree fell onto a boy in Montgomery County while being cut in preparation for the storm, and another person was killed not far away from a fallen tree during the storm. After the storm, another tree-cutting accident involving a damaged tree killed another young boy in Montgomery County, and a cleanup accident involving a truck resulted in a fourth death in the county. Another fallen tree in Huntsville resulted in a fatality after it crashed into a house. In Anahuac, one person was electrocuted in the preparations, and one person was killed by a house fire while without power in Walker County. One person in San Leon drowned. Corpus Christi received winds at tropical-storm force. Near Corpus Christi, a man was reportedly swept away with the Coast Guard searching for his body after the storm had passed.

=== Electrical outages ===
CenterPoint Energy, the largest power company in the region, said that it had restored power to 112,000 homes and business on Saturday, plus many of Houston's skyscrapers had regained power. The progress was as follows:

- by Saturday evening, 112,000 customers had power;
- by Sunday noon, 262,000 customers had power;
- by Tuesday 9 p.m., 750,000 customers had power.

However, over 1.5 million people remained without power as of September 16, 2008.

Entergy Texas, whose service area includes Beaumont-Port Arthur west to cities north of Houston such as The Woodlands and Conroe, estimated that 392,600 of their 395,000 customers lost power during Ike. Although nearly all their customers lost power, the company reported restoration of electrical service to all customers who could safely receive power on September 25, twelve days after the storm. The majority of Entergy customers unable to receive power were located in High Island and on the Bolivar Peninsula.

=== Offshore ships and oil rigs ===
On Saturday, September 13, 2008, the US Coast Guard sent the tugboat Rotterdam to rescue the crew of a disabled freighter, Antalina, carrying 22 people, hours after the ship had survived Hurricane Ike, without any means of escaping. Repairs to the ship's broken fuel pump will be made at sea; the tugboat will then tow the ship to Port Arthur, to be anchored for additional repairs and eventually to offload more of its cargo: petroleum coke, a petroleum byproduct.

Two oil rigs were adrift in the Gulf of Mexico, but crews had prepared to secure both rigs as soon as the water conditions settled.

As of September 19, a revised total of 49 oil and gas platforms, of the 3,800 in the Gulf, were considered destroyed (compared with 44 destroyed during Hurricane Katrina).

BP reported that the drilling derrick (tower) on its Mad Dog platform had been toppled into the sea, adding that it was too early to predict when the platform could resume production.

=== Oil refineries ===
There were 14 oil refineries in the affected region, and 8 were known to have survived with little flooding.

=== Emergency shelters ===
Several communities accepted thousands of evacuees, or later refugees, from the impact areas, including:

- In Galveston, Ball High School held 200 evacuees (as a "shelter of last resort"), plus providing meals to hundreds more.
- In San Antonio, about 219 miles (352 km) from Galveston, shelters held nearly 5,000 evacuees.
- In Tyler, about 200 miles (320 km) inland, 3,400 evacuees took temporary refuge, and it became clear that some shelters would not suffice for long-term evacuation.
- More than 4,000 people rode out the storm in tents, campers and RVs, according to the Texas Parks and Wildlife Department.

There were other shelters as well.

== Recovery ==
Response teams from the Texas Rural Water Association moved from their staging area in Mauriceville, Texas the day after landfall. They distributed emergency generators to impacted systems, some as early as eight hours after the loss of water service.

== Economic impact ==
Property damage in Texas from the storm was estimated to be $29 billion. The storm also had a large lingering negative economic impact to the state long after the storm with estimates totaling $142 billion according to a Hurricane Ike Impact Report by the Texas Engineering Extension Service

Below is a summary of the estimated economic impact by county according to the report. Each surveyed county experienced decreases in economic performance during the study period with the exception of Liberty County which experienced a growth.

- Brazoria County - $1.8 billion ($528.5 million in manufacturing sector).
- Chambers County - $20 billion ($12.1 billion in utilities sector).
- Galveston County - $22.16 billion ($19.5 billion in manufacturing sector).
- Harris County - $103.8 billion ($38.8 billion in wholesale sector).
- Jefferson County - $11.9 billion ($9.1 billion in manufacturing sector).
- Liberty County - Only county where economy grew following Ike - Growth during study period was $169.8 million. The county's economic growth was burdened with $277 million in losses in the manufacturing sector.
- Orange County - $364.9 million ($116 million in retail).
- Tyler County - $79.9 million ($50.4 million in real estate).

== See also ==
- Hurricane Ike - main storm article for Ike
- Effects of Hurricane Ike in inland North America
- 1900 Galveston Hurricane - the catastrophic Category 4 hurricane for which the city of Galveston is famous
- Hurricane Gustav - another 2008 Category 4 storm that existed prior to Hurricane Ike
- 2008 Atlantic hurricane season
