= White Store Church and Evergreen Cemetery =

Historic church in New York, United States

- U.S. National Register of Historic Places
- U.S. Historic district
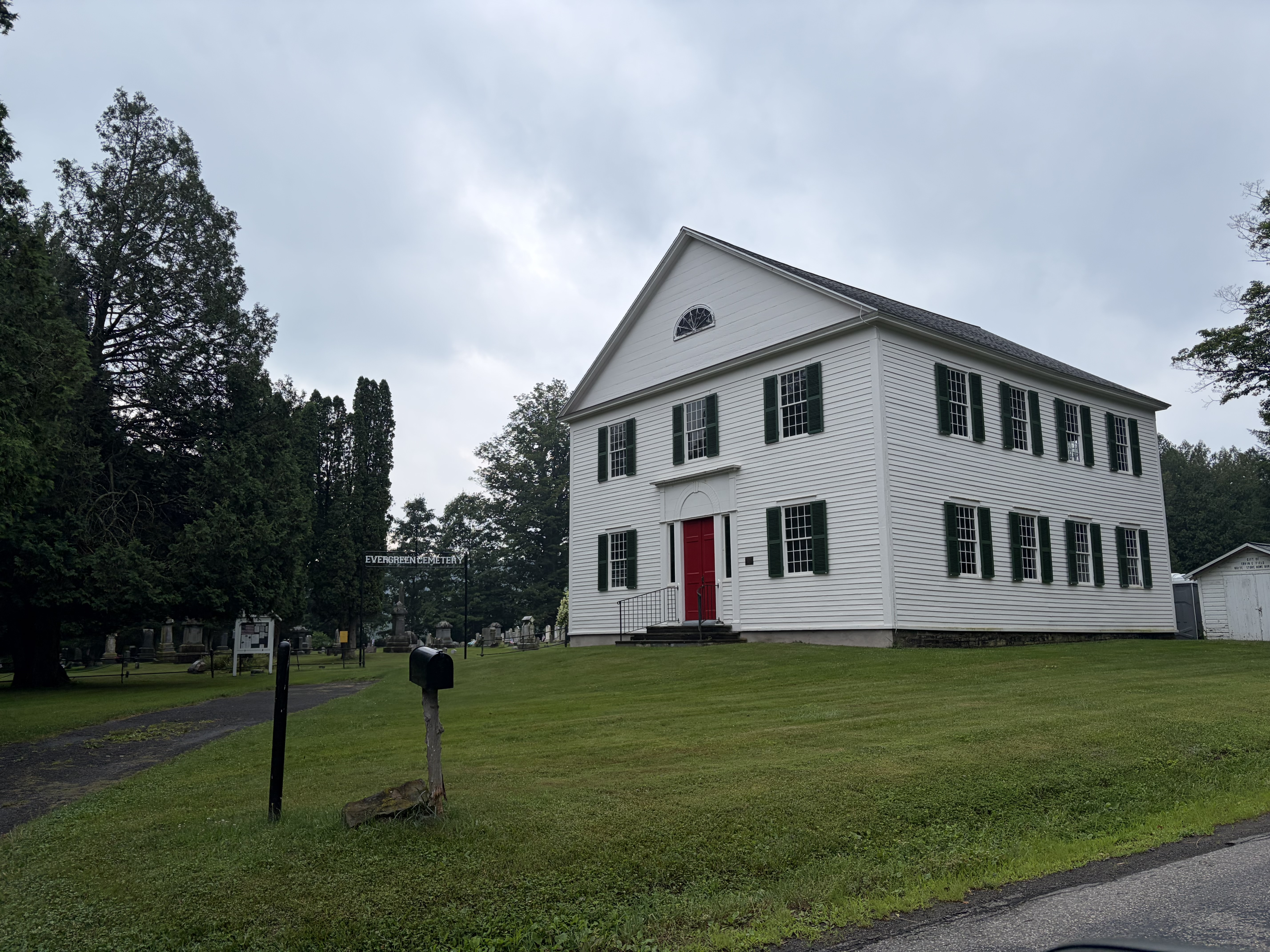
- White Store Church and the entrance to Evergreen Cemetery

- Location within New York Location within the United States
- Location: Jct. of NY 8 and White Store Rd., 4 mi. S of South New Berlin, Norwich, New York
- Coordinates: 42°29.0′N 75°24.4′W
- Area: 4 acres (1.6 ha)
- Architectural style: Federal
- NRHP reference No.: 95000047
- Added to NRHP: February 10, 1995

White Store Church and Evergreen Cemetery is a national historic district containing a historic meetinghouse and cemetery at the junction of New York State Route 8 and White Store Road, 4 miles south of South New Berlin in Norwich, Chenango County, New York. The district includes two contributing buildings, one contributing site, and seven contributing structures. The property consists of the cemetery established in 1805 and a Federal style frame church completed in 1820. Also on the property is a small maintenance shed and privy. The church is a simple, two story frame structure with a gable roof, measuring 40 feet wide and 46 feet deep. The cemetery contains approximately 400 burials, with the earliest stones dated to 1795.

It was added to the National Register of Historic Places in 1995.
