= Governor Bond State Memorial =

Monument in Evergreen Cemetery, Illinois

- Interactive map of Governor Bond State Memorial
- Location: Chester, Illinois, US
- Coordinates: 37°55′2.7″N 89°49′37.3″W
- Type: Obelisk
- Material: Granite
- Opening date: 1883
- Website: https://dnrhistoric.illinois.gov/experience/sites/site.governor-bond-memorial.html

Governor Bond State Memorial is a granite monument that marks the grave of Shadrach Bond, the first governor of Illinois after it became a state in 1818. Born in Maryland, Bond settled in Monroe County, Illinois, in 1794, and served as an Illinois Territory delegate to the U.S. House of Representatives from 1812 to 1814. Erected in 1883, the monument is styled as an obelisk and is maintained by the Illinois Historic Preservation Agency as a state historic site. The monument is located in Evergreen Cemetery, Illinois Route 3 North, in Chester, Illinois, United States.

In September 2008, Governor Bond's obelisk – the tallest and most prominent monument in the cemetery – was toppled due to the effects of Hurricane Ike.
