= Evergreen Memorial Park =

Evergreen Memorial Park may refer to:

- Evergreen Cemetery (Los Angeles)
- Evergreen Memorial Park (Riverside, California)
- Evergreen Memorial Park (Omaha, Nebraska)
- Evergreen Memorial Park (Portsmouth, Virginia)

== See also ==
- Evergreen Cemetery (disambiguation)
- Evergreen Memorial Park (disambiguation)
