= Evergreen Cemetery (Tannersville, New York) =

Cemetery

Coordinates: 42°11′00″N 74°09′08″W

Evergreen Cemetery is a cemetery located in Tannersville, Greene County, New York. It holds graves dating to the 1810s.

== Notable graves ==
- Judd Bruce Doyle, aka, Slow Joe Doyle, (1881–1947), professional baseball player
