= Evergreen Cemetery (Medway, Massachusetts) =

Historic cemetery in Massachusetts, United States

- U.S. National Register of Historic Places
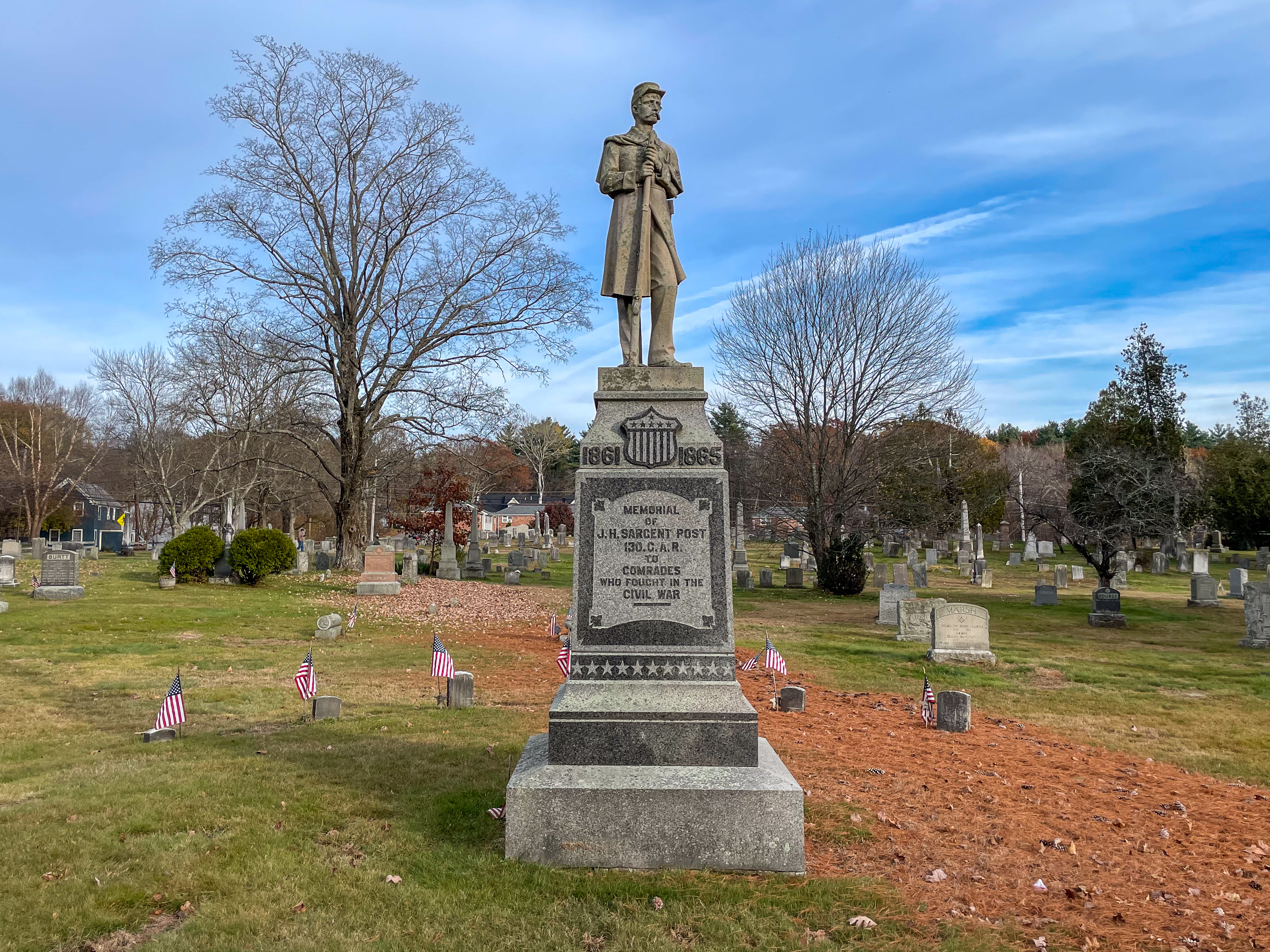

- Location within Massachusetts Location within the United States
- Location: 8 Evergreen Street, Medway, Massachusetts
- Coordinates: 42°8′51″N 71°25′25″W
- Area: 12.8 acres (5.2 ha)
- Built: 1750
- Architect: Joseph Barbur Jr.
- NRHP reference No.: 100006778
- Added to NRHP: August 4, 2021

Evergreen Cemetery is an active cemetery at Evergreen and Cottage Streets in Medway, Massachusetts. Founded in 1750, it is one of the community's oldest cemeteries, with burials including many of its early families, as well as veterans of the American Revolutionary War and American Civil War. It also houses the burial of Joseph Barbur Jr., a regionally prominent funerary stone carver. The cemetery was listed on the National Register of Historic Places in 2021.

== Description ==
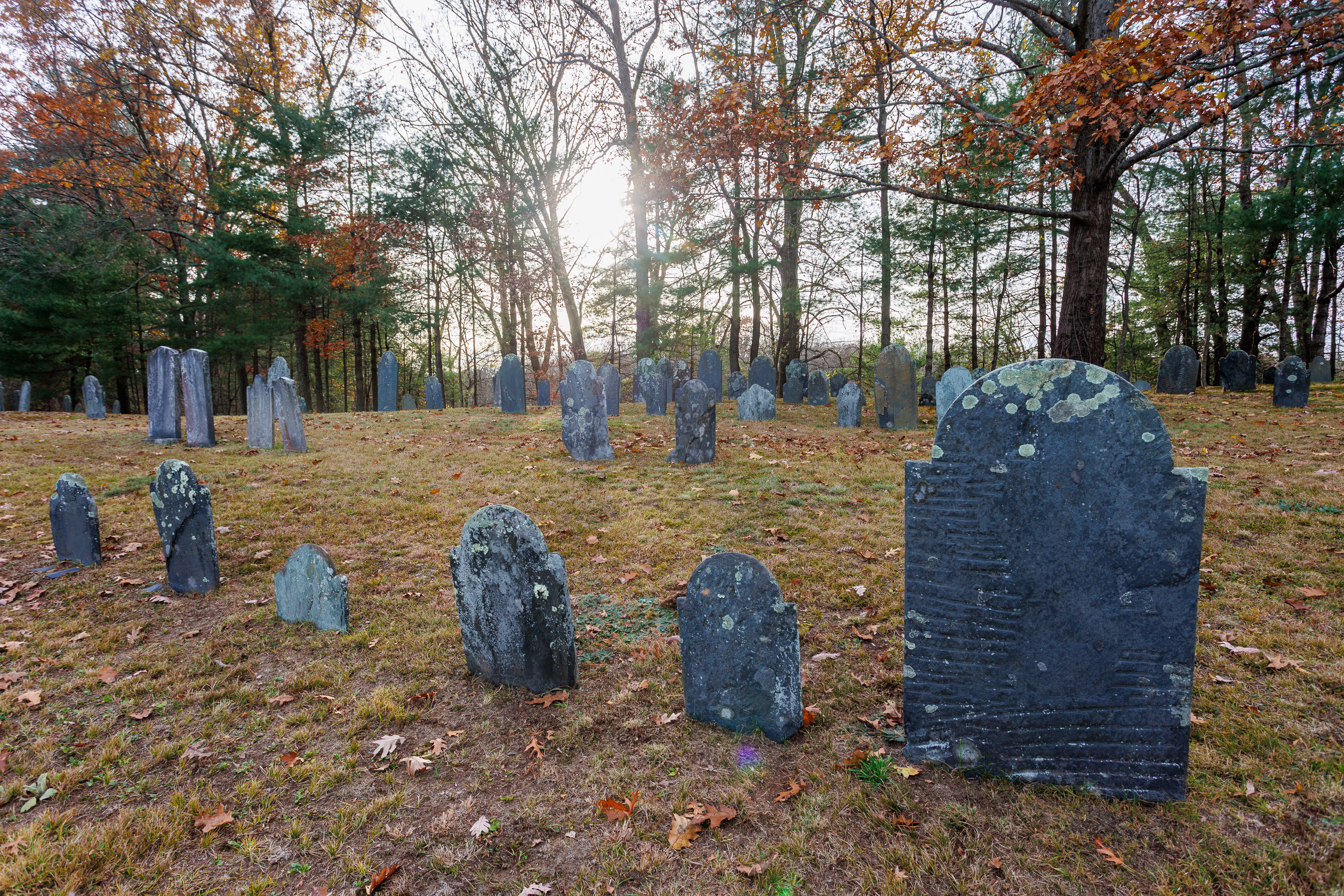
Older section

Evergreen Cemetery is located in south central Medway, occupying about 13 acres (5.3 ha) bounded on the north by Evergreen Street and the east by Cottage Street. The principal drive through the cemetery runs north–south through the center, roughly paralleling a brook that ends in a pond near the center of the cemetery. The brook separates the oldest portion of the cemetery (on its west side) from most of its later sections. The oldest portion is located on a small hill, with mainly slate grave markers. The later eastern section is generally flat and subdivided into rectangular grids. The newest section is located south of the oldest, accessed via a causeway crossing the southern part of the pond.

The cemetery was founded in 1750 by the western precinct of Medway (whose eastern precinct is now the town of Millis). The initial half-acre parcel of land was purchased from Henry Guernsey. Over the course of the 19th century, the cemetery was expanded multiple times, reaching its present size in 1876. Prominent structures in the cemetery include the Jackson family mausoleum, and the maintenance cottage; the latter is a fine example of Italianate architecture. The old section of the cemetery includes at least 50 stones known to have been carved by the regionally prominent stone carver Joseph Barbur Jr., who is also interred there.

== See also ==
- National Register of Historic Places listings in Norfolk County, Massachusetts
