= Hurricane Audrey =

Category 3 Atlantic hurricane in 1957

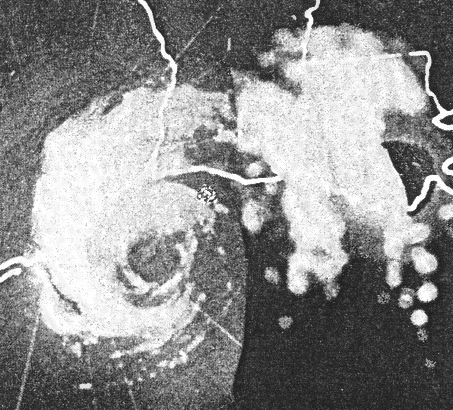
- Radar image of Audrey prior to landfall

Meteorological history
- Formed: June 25, 1957
- Dissipated: June 29, 1957

Category 3 major hurricane
- 1-minute sustained (SSHWS/NWS)
- Highest winds: 125 mph (205 km/h)
- Lowest pressure: 946 mbar (hPa); 27.94 inHg

Overall effects
- Fatalities: 416
- Damage: $150 million (1957 USD)
- Areas affected: South Central United States (particularly Texas and Louisiana), Southeastern United States, Midwestern United States, New England, Quebec, Ontario
- IBTrACS
- Part of the 1957 Atlantic hurricane season

Hurricane Audrey was a catastrophic and very deadly hurricane that devastated the southwestern Louisiana coast in 1957. Along with Hurricane Alex in 2010, it was also the most intense June hurricane ever recorded in the Atlantic basin, with a pressure of 946 mbar (hPa; 27.91 inHg), and was the strongest in terms of windspeed until Hurricane Beryl in 2024. The rapidly developing storm struck southwestern Louisiana as an intense Category 3 hurricane, destroying coastal communities with a powerful storm surge that penetrated as far as 20 mi (32 km) inland. The first named storm and hurricane of the 1957 hurricane season, Audrey formed on June 24 from a tropical wave that moved into the Bay of Campeche. Situated within ideal conditions for tropical development, Audrey quickly strengthened, reaching hurricane status a day afterwards. Moving north, it continued to strengthen and accelerate as it approached the United States Gulf Coast. On June 27, the hurricane reached peak sustained winds of 125 mph (205 km/h), making it a major hurricane. (Note: A major hurricane is a tropical cyclone with maximum sustained winds of at least 111 mph (179 km/h), or a Category 3 or higher on the Saffir–Simpson hurricane scale.) At the time, Audrey had a minimum barometric pressure of 946 mbar (hPa; 27.91 inHg). The hurricane made landfall with the same intensity between the mouth of the Sabine River and Cameron, Louisiana, later that day, causing unprecedented destruction across the region. Once inland, Audrey weakened and turned extratropical over West Virginia on June 29. Audrey was the first major hurricane to form in the Gulf of Mexico since 1945.

Prior to making landfall, Audrey severely disrupted offshore drilling operations in the Gulf of Mexico. Damages from offshore oil facilities alone were estimated at $16 million. (Note: All damage totals are in 1957 United States dollars unless otherwise noted.) Audrey caused much of its destruction near the border between Texas and Louisiana. The hurricane's strong winds resulted in widespread property and infrastructural damage. Power outages also resulted from the strong winds. However, as is typical with most landfalling tropical cyclones, most of the destruction at the coast was the result of the hurricane's strong storm surge, which was amplified by Audrey's rapid strengthening just prior to landfall. The storm surge was reported to have peaked as high as 12 ft (3.7 m), inundating coastal areas. Damage from the surge alone extended 25 mi (40 km) inland. The rough seas killed nine people offshore after capsizing the boat they were in. Further inland in Louisiana, the storm spawned two tornadoes, causing additional damage. Audrey also dropped heavy rainfall, peaking at 10.63 in (270 mm) near Basile. In Louisiana and Texas, where Audrey first impacted, the damage toll was $128 million.

After moving inland and transitioning into an extratropical cyclone, Audrey caused additional damage across the interior United States. The storm produced 18 tornadoes across Mississippi and Alabama, causing $600,000 in losses and killing one person. As it moved towards the northeast, moisture associated with the extratropical remnants of Audrey intersected with a cold front over the Midwest, producing record rainfall that peaked at 10.20 in (259 mm) in Paris, Illinois. The resultant flooding killed 10 people. Elsewhere in the United States, the storm brought strong winds that wrought additional damage. Farther north, in Canada, 15 people were killed in Ontario and Quebec. Strong winds and torrential rainfall disrupted transportation services. In Quebec, ten people were killed in the Montreal area, making Audrey the deadliest hurricane to strike the Canadian province in recorded history. The storm was also considered among the worst storms to strike Quebec. In the United States, Audrey killed at least 416 people, the majority of whom were in Cameron Parish, Louisiana, though the final death total may never be known. Damage totaled $147 million in the country, at the time the fifth-costliest hurricane recorded in the US since 1900. The name Audrey was later retired from usage as an identifier for an Atlantic hurricane.

== Meteorological history ==
Map plotting the storm's track and intensity, according to the Saffir–Simpson scale Map key Saffir–Simpson scale Tropical depression (≤38 mph, ≤62 km/h) Tropical storm (39–73 mph, 63–118 km/h) Category 1 (74–95 mph, 119–153 km/h) Category 2 (96–110 mph, 154–177 km/h) Category 3 (111–129 mph, 178–208 km/h) Category 4 (130–156 mph, 209–251 km/h) Category 5 (≥157 mph, ≥252 km/h) Unknown Storm type Tropical cyclone Subtropical cyclone Extratropical cyclone, remnant low, tropical disturbance, or monsoon depression

The formation and development of Hurricane Audrey was multi-faceted. One contributor to Audrey's formation—an area of anomalously intense low-pressure areas roughly 10,000 ft (3,000 m) above sea level—was first detected in the western Caribbean Sea on June 11. In an analysis of weather patterns from June 1957, Weather Bureau meteorologist William H. Klein noted the potential for research on similar disturbances to shed light on tropical cyclone development. Concurrently, surface observations suggested the progression of a disorganized tropical wave tracking westward across the Caribbean Sea beginning on June 20, eventually entering the Bay of Campeche on June 22.

At 12:00 UTC on June 24 (7:00 a.m. CST), storms associated with the wave organized into a tropical depression based on ship reports in the bay; at the time, the first indication of a developing tropical cyclone originated from a report from a shrimp boat. The depression was in a highly favorable environment for intensification in the western Gulf of Mexico; sea surface temperatures in the area were at 85 °F (29 °C), which were 3 °F (2 °C), above normal for the time of year. In addition, the latitudinal alignment of a polar trough over the Great Plains and the nascent disturbance in the Bay of Campeche created an environment suitable for outflow in the upper-levels of the atmosphere. Taking advantage of these conditions, Audrey intensified into a tropical storm just six hours after being classified as a tropical depression, as it remained nearly stationary.

On June 25, the first reconnaissance aircraft to probe Audrey, a P-2 Neptune, reached the system to assess its strength, concluding that Audrey had strengthened into a hurricane on 18:00 UTC that day (1:00 p.m. CST), capping off an initial phase of rapid intensification about 380 mi (610 km) southeast of Brownsville, Texas. Now moving slowly northward around the periphery of a ridge of high pressure over the eastern Gulf of Mexico, the storm's strengthening slowed on June 26, though reconnaissance revealed an increase in the storm's rainfall. The following day, Audrey entered a second phase of intensification as it accelerated towards the United States Gulf Coast, reaching the equivalent of a modern-day Category 2 hurricane on the Saffir–Simpson hurricane wind scale at 00:00 UTC on June 27 (7:00 p.m. CST June 26) and Category 3 status just six hours later.

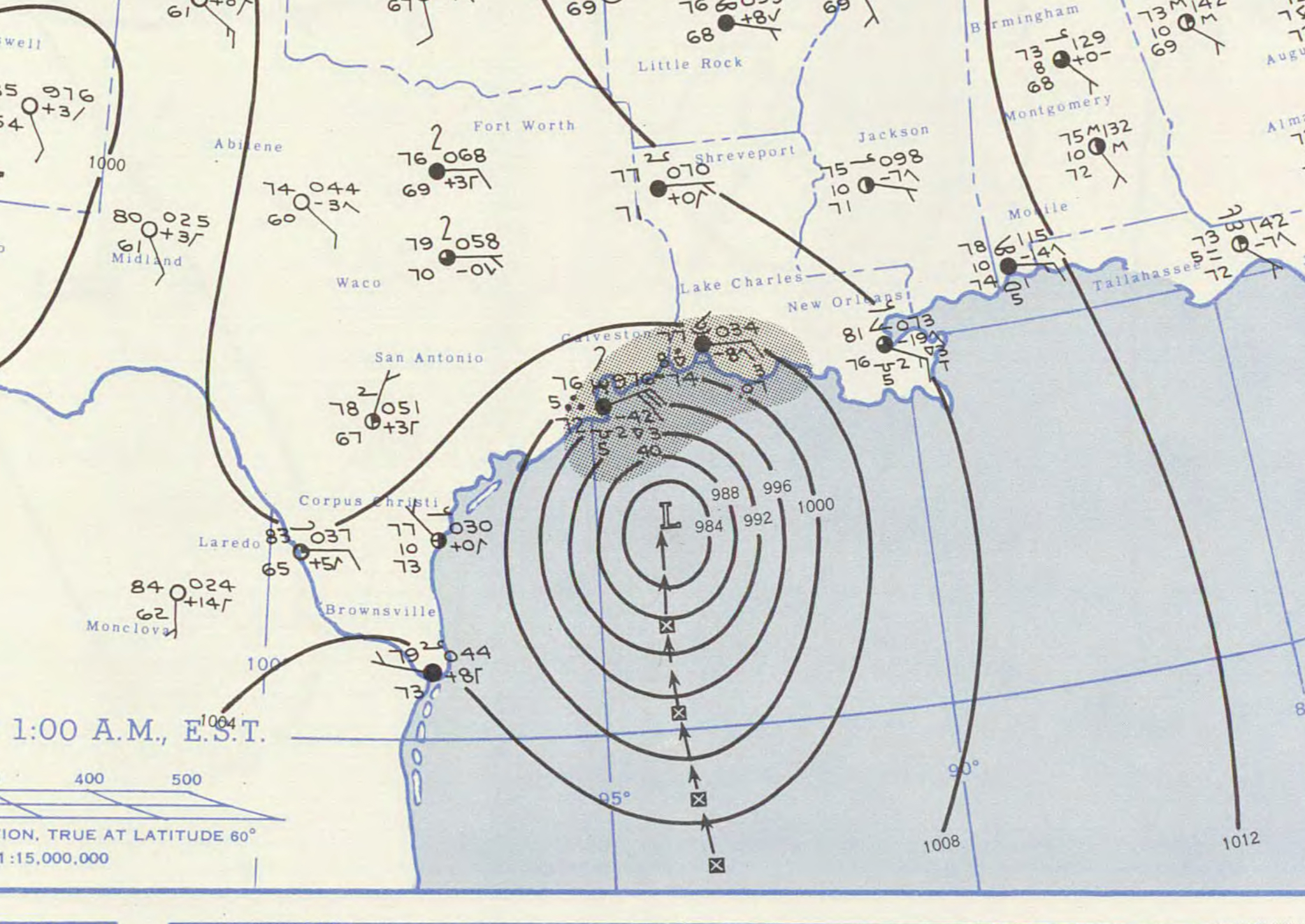
Surface weather analysis showing Hurricane Audrey nearing landfall in southwest Louisiana on June 27

Between the final observation from aircraft and landfall, the storm's pressure had deepened by roughly 30 mbar (hPa; 0.89 inHg). The last observation near the storm's center occurred approximately five hours before landfall by the tanker Tillamook, documenting a pressure of 969 mbar (hPa; 27.94 inHg) at the western edge of the storm's eyewall. At 13:30 UTC (8:30 a.m. CST) on June 27, Audrey made landfall at peak intensity just east of the border between Texas and Louisiana with winds of 125 mph (200 km/h) and a minimum central pressure of 946 mbar (hPa; 28.61 inHg). An oil rig observed conditions that suggested a much stronger storm with winds of 180 mph (290 km/h) and a pressure of 925 mbar (hPa; 27.32 inHg), but those were discarded as erroneous. Radar and ground observations suggested the storm had concentric eyewalls at the time of landfall, resulting in two wind maxima. Operationally, Audrey was assessed to have been a Category 4 hurricane at landfall, with various estimation methods suggesting a much lower barometric pressure, however the Atlantic hurricane reanalysis project reassessed the system having a lower peak intensity.

Audrey gradually weakened and turned to the northeast after moving inland, degenerating to a tropical storm on June 28. An approaching cold front caused Audrey to evolve into an extratropical cyclone, completing this transition on June 29 over West Virginia with a final pressure of 995 mbar (hPa; 29.38 inHg). At the same time, a second extratropical cyclone developed near Chicago, Illinois and tracked eastward. Six hours later, the remnants of Audrey were absorbed by this second extratropical cyclone over the Great Lakes. The interaction of Audrey with this second system led to the merged extratropical cyclone unexpectedly intensifying, producing hurricane-force winds as it moved across the Northeastern United States, aided in part by an unusual warming of the stratosphere. As an extratropical system, Audrey reached a minimum pressure of 974 mbar (hPa; 28.76 inHg) roughly 140 mi (230 km) north of Buffalo, New York in southwestern Quebec; the post-tropical strengthening of Audrey was reminiscent to that of Hurricane Hazel in 1954.

== Preparations ==
Radar mosaic imagery of Audrey from three radar sites as it made landfall on June 27

Although Audrey's formation was not explicitly forecast, the Weather Bureau in Miami, Florida, had issued its first experimental 30-day hurricane forecast on June 17, underscoring a high likelihood for the development of one or two tropical storms in the forecast period. The first bulletin on Audrey was issued by the Weather Bureau office in New Orleans, Louisiana, at 04:30 UTC on June 25 (11:30 p.m. CST June 24), while Audrey was still a tropical depression in the Bay of Campeche. A hurricane watch was posted for the coasts of Texas and Louisiana the following day. A hurricane warning was issued for the entirety of the Louisiana coast at 10 a.m. CST on June 26, with the Weather Bureau highlighting similarities in the paths of Audrey and Hurricane Flossy in 1956; experience with Flossy aided in part in convincing Grand Isle, Louisiana, residents to evacuate. At the same time, northwest storm warnings were issued for the Texas coast east of Galveston, while southeast storm warnings were issued for the U.S. Gulf Coast between Louisiana and Pensacola, Florida. Small coastal craft from Brownsville, Texas, to Panama City, Florida, were advised to remain in port. Hurricane warnings were later extended westward to High Island, Texas by June 27. Although warnings were issued 24 hours before landfall, the acceleration of Audrey as it neared land surprised meteorologists and residents.

Loop of the path and storm surge associated with Hurricane Audrey

In total, approximately 75,000 people evacuated from low-lying areas on the United States Gulf Coast in advance of Audrey. Due to the threat of inundation of the bridge over Rollover Pass, 270 beach houses and other homes on the lower end of the Bolivar Peninsula were evacuated, with evacuees staying at either nearby Fort Travis or Port Bolivar. Offshore oil rigs were secured, with hundreds of personnel evacuated by helicopter on June 26, including those operated by Kerr-McGee, Gulf Oil, and Humble Oil. An estimated 50,000 people in total evacuated from Port Arthur, Texas, while all except two families evacuated Sabine Pass; about 2,000 people evacuated from Orange, Texas, with another 1,000 evacuating from Beaumont, Texas. The American Red Cross opened fifteen shelters in Port Arthur which eventually housed 5,000. Four hundred children in church camps in Galveston were evacuated inland to Baytown, Texas. A public shelter program was established for Louisiana evacuees by the state civil defense, invoking National Guard equipment and personnel; all civil defense groups in the state were ordered to place key men on 24-hour duty.

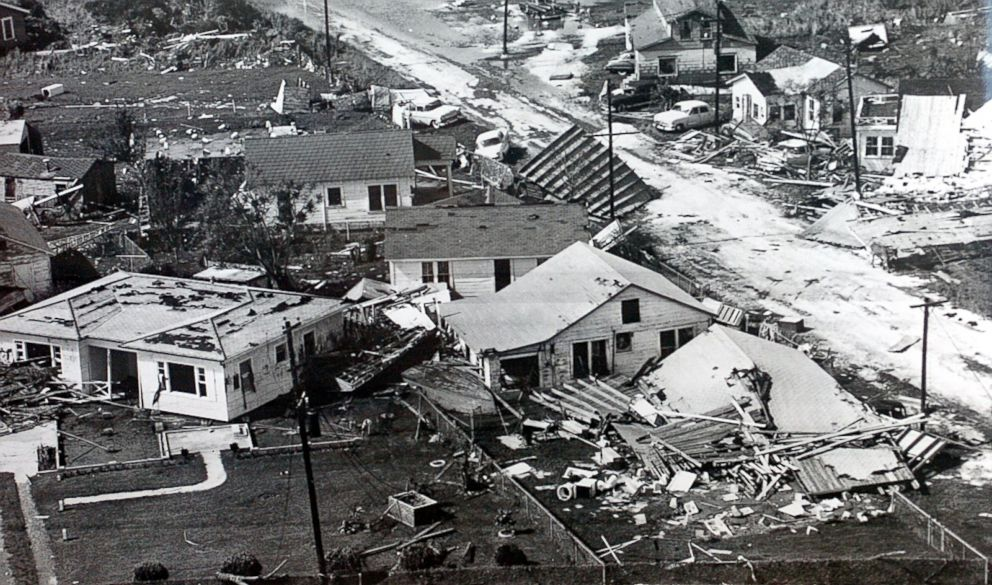
Devastation in Cameron, Louisiana after Hurricane Audrey

Evacuation procedures began on Grand Isle, Louisiana on June 26, culminating in the evacuation of 3,400 people; however, 600 people opted to remain in Grand Isle. Most of Cameron, Louisiana, was evacuated, while the remaining sought refuge in the town's courthouse and other structures. Red Cross shelters in Lake Charles, Louisiana housed 19,000 refugees and issued food rations to 30,000 people. The United States Air Force and United States Navy evacuated 115 North American T-28 Trojans from Naval Outlying Landing Field Barin in Alabama to Barksdale Air Force Base. Similarly, aircraft and personnel were evacuated out of Keesler Air Force Base in Biloxi, Mississippi, and the Gulfport Combat Readiness Training Center in Gulfport, Mississippi.

The high death toll caused by Audrey was partially blamed on the incompleteness of evacuations before the storm made landfall, attributed by meteorologist Robert Simpson to a lack of proper communication between coastal residents and forecasters. Although the Weather Bureau's advisories and warnings were technically accurate, they were found in Bartie v. United States to have lacked a sense of urgency or emergency. The warnings advised the evacuation of "low or exposed areas," but many inland residents at an elevation of 7–8 ft (2.1–2.4 m) did not consider themselves to be at a low elevation. In addition, newly elected city officials in Lake Charles, Louisiana, edited warnings and advisories disseminated by a local radio broadcast, tailoring the bulletins to local residents by trimming details deemed irrelevant and possibly resulting in a hesitance to evacuate until it was too late.

== Impact ==
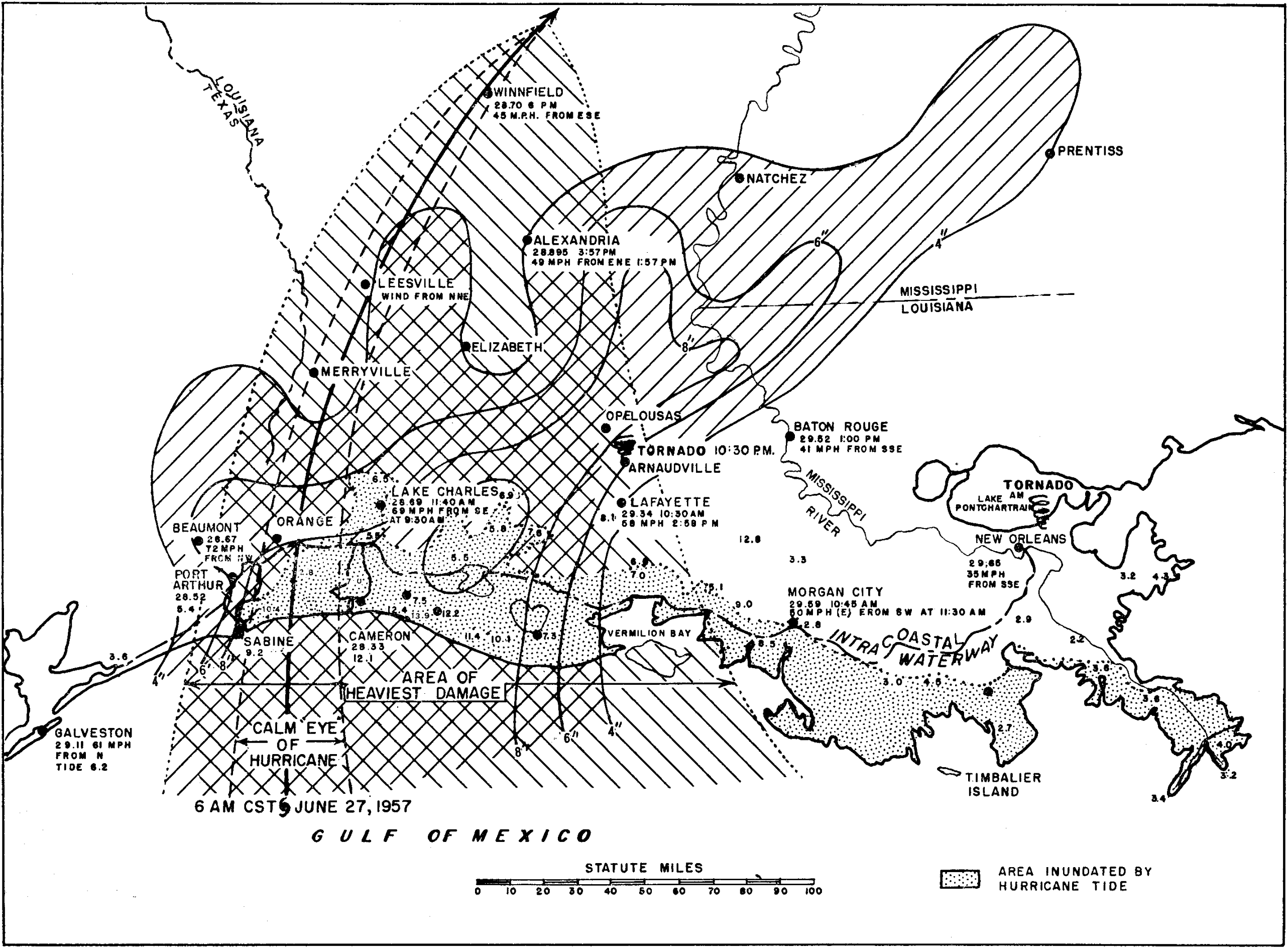
Summary of Audrey's impacts at landfall showing the extent of seawater inundation, winds, and rainfall

The Weather Bureau initially estimated that the death toll from Audrey was over 500, with the cost of damage estimated between $150–200 million. Other estimates indicated that the death toll amounted to 390, including 263 identified and 127 unidentified persons. An additional 192 people were reported as missing. The National Weather Service report on the most impactful tropical cyclones in the United States lists Audrey as having caused at least 416 fatalities, with an additional 15 killed in Canada. Audrey was the deadliest hurricane to strike the United States since the 1928 Okeechobee hurricane, which killed approximately 2,500, and comparable to all storms affecting the country in the previous decade combined. Nearly all deaths were attributed to storm surge drowning.

=== Texas ===
The fishing vessel Keturah sank after colliding with an oil rig 11 mi (18 km) off of Galveston, Texas, leading to the loss of nine crewmen. In the hours before the collision, the Keturah had been disabled and taken in tow by the USCGC Cahoone (WSC-131), but the tow line broke. In Corpus Christi, where tides were 3–4 ft (90–120 cm) above normal, a 400 ft (120 m) tanker, a tug, and a few barges washed aground. The surf also washed out a portion of Mustang Island Park Road between Corpus Christi Pass and Packery Channel. Another person drowned in the rough surf off the Texas coast. At Port Isabel, tides swelled 2.5 ft (about 75 cm) above normal as Audrey passed to the east, though coastal flooding remained minimal. Periodic squalls impacted the Brownsville, Texas, area without much consequence, though the wave action on nearby Padre Island pushed marine debris beyond the seawall; tides on Padre Island were the highest in five years. The oil barge Pemrod broke from its mooring, leaving it adrift in Sabine Lake.

In Galveston, the storm surge swelled to a height of 6.2 ft (1.9 m) above mean sea level; the total expanse of coast that saw tides higher than 6 ft (1.8 m) spanned 330 mi (530 km). The surge topped the Galveston Seawall, flooding the downtown streets and inundating businesses. Several boats in Galveston Harbor were sunk. A 0.75 mi (1.21 km) segment of Texas State Highway 87 between Sabine Pass and High Island was submerged. Despite the seawater inundation in some areas of Galveston Island, an extension of the Galveston Seawall completed in 1953 was assessed to have mitigated about $100,000 in damage from Audrey. A fish market, crab depot, and a smaller shack were destroyed in Texas City, and the city's fishing pier sustained $5,000 in damage after being struck by a loose barge. Two oil barges spanning 105 ft (32 m) were moved 2.5 mi (4.0 km) inland north of Gilchrist, Texas.

Portions of eastern Texas were analyzed to have experienced high-end Category 2 conditions as Audrey made landfall just east of the state. Winds reached 72 mph (116 km/h) in Port Arthur and 78 mph (126 km/h) in Galveston. Plate glass windows in downtown Galveston were broken by flying debris, as were high-rise windows in Port Arthur. At least 50 homes on the Bolivar Peninsula were flattened. Most roofs on the peninsula sustained substantial damage. The most severe damage on the peninsula occurred in and around Gilchrist, where the majority of destroyed homes were located. On the southern end of the Bolivar Peninsula, the effects of Audrey in Port Bolivar were limited to lost shingles. Galveston Island fared comparatively better than the Bolivar Peninsula but nonetheless sustained some impacts. Some beachfront establishments in Galveston were demolished by the strong winds and storm surge. The rough surf also washed out some segments of Galveston beaches, exacerbated by a local practice of digging holes to sell soil from private beachfront property. Minor power outages knocked out service to some 1,700 telephones, but power was quickly restored. Damage in Galveston County was estimated at $200,000–$300,000. In nearby Orange, homes were damaged by falling trees felled by strong winds. Power and other utility lines were also downed, leaving only connectivity for emergency telephones and cutting most power to the city. Fifteen people were injured while one was killed in Orange. At Jefferson County Airport, 7.35 in (187 mm) of rain fell on June 27, setting a daily rainfall record. The monetary cost of Audrey's damage in Texas totaled $8 million, with a conservative estimate of $1.5 million for Orange County alone. A total of nine fatalities occurred in the state, in addition to 450 injuries.

=== Louisiana ===
Hurricane Audrey's strong winds generated rough seas offshore Louisiana, with wave heights of 40–50 ft (12–15 m) occurring in the Gulf of Mexico. At the coast, tides ran 5–9 ft (1.5–2.7 m) above normal, inundating low-lying areas and penetrating as far as 20 mi (32 km) inland, resulting in over 1.6 million acres (6,500 km^{2}) of land flooded by either storm surge or river flooding. In Cameron, tides peaked at 10.6 ft (3.2 m) above mean sea level, with some waves reaching as high as 10 ft (3.0 m) atop the high water. Tides exceeded 12 ft (3.7 m) for a 24 mi (39 km) stretch of the Louisiana coastline, peaking at 12.4 ft (3.8 m) just west of Cameron. Four Continental Oil sea tenders lost their anchors and went adrift in the rough seas. Some drifting oil tenders also reported gusts reaching 150 mph (240 km/h). A $2 million oil rig 15 mi (24 km) east of Sabine Pass capsized, though all crew survived. Damage to offshore oil facilities caused by Audrey reached $16 million, though one offshore trade journal remarked that "the [oil] industry has scored an overwhelming though costly victory" due to the lack of industry-related fatalities and small extent of damage compared to coastal communities. Beach erosion caused by rough surf stripped away as much as 90 m (300 ft) of beach. Wildlife along the coast was impacted heavily, with marshes stripped entirely of vegetation. Clumps of salt hay (Spartina patens) were brought as far as 8 km (5.0 mi) inland. Scattered damage occurred in Alexandria, with strong winds knocking out telecommunications and downing tree limbs. Winds were measured at 88 mph (142 km/h) in Lake Charles, Louisiana roughly 35 mi (56 km) northeast of Audrey's eye as it made landfall. A gust was clocked at 105 mph (169 km/h) in Sulphur before the anemometer blew away, though the highest sustained wind at an official observation site was 96 mph (154 km/h) at Lake Charles Air Force Base. Communities along coastal Louisiana near the point of landfall were completely destroyed, with 4,500 homes considered destroyed or irreparably damaged and another 100,000 sustaining varying degrees of lesser damage. In some towns west of the Atchafalaya River, 90% of homes lost their roofs. In Cameron and Grand Chenier, Audrey destroyed or displaced 60–80% of homes, while between 90 and 95% of all buildings overall in Cameron and nearby Vermilion Parish were irreparably damaged. Nearly every home in Lake Charles sustained some degree of damage. The city of Cameron sustained the most damage, and 371 people in and around the city perished. The city courthouse, where Cameron residents sought refuge, remained the only building left standing in Cameron. Wood-frame houses were swept by Audrey's storm surge and carried inland several miles from their original locations, with most found on the Intracoastal Waterway. Dead cattle, alligators, snakes, nutria, and muskrats were also deposited in the waterway, blocking segments of the canal; an estimated 40,000–50,000 head of cattle perished, primarily by drowning. Several ships were carried well inland, causing damage; two 50 ft (15 m) long fishing boats were deposited on Cameron's Main Street (Louisiana Highway 82) while an offshore oil rig destroyed four fuel storage tanks as it was moved onshore. Strong winds initially prevented the United States Coast Guard from rescuing stranded residents in the city and nearby areas after dispatching a helicopter and some lifeboats. Further east, Pecan Island was submerged under a foot (0.3 m) of seawater. Strong winds in Baton Rouge blew out windows in the Louisiana State Capitol. One person was killed while clinging to debris after being bitten by a venomous water snake.

Saltwater inundation was particularly damaging to rice, while strong winds blew down corn and heavy rains flooded cotton fields; these were the main crop losses attributed to Audrey. In Louisiana, preliminary estimates of crop damage reached $5 million. Forests were also heavily impacted, with an estimated 50,000,000 ft (1,400,000 m^{3}) of timber lost primarily in the parishes of Jeff Davis, Allen, Evangeline, and LaSalle. Poisoning efforts that had begun prior to Audrey's arrival to mitigate a boll weevil infestation were disrupted, leading to a resurgence in boll weevils following the hurricane. The highest rainfall associated with Audrey fell in Louisiana, where 10.63 in (270 mm) were recorded just west of Basille; most of the heaviest rainfall occurred east of Audrey's center of circulation. Daily rainfall records were set in Jennings and Lafayette, recording 10.40 in (264 mm) and 3.69 in (94 mm) on June 27, respectively. Audrey also spawned two tornadoes in Louisiana: the first was an F0 tornado east of Seabrook (New Orleans East) while the other one was an F1 tornado that damaged several homes near Arnaudville. In total, damage from Hurricane Audrey in Louisiana amounted to $120 million. An estimated 400 people lost their lives in the state, accounting for most of the deaths attributed to Audrey, while another 1,000 were injured.

=== Elsewhere in the United States ===
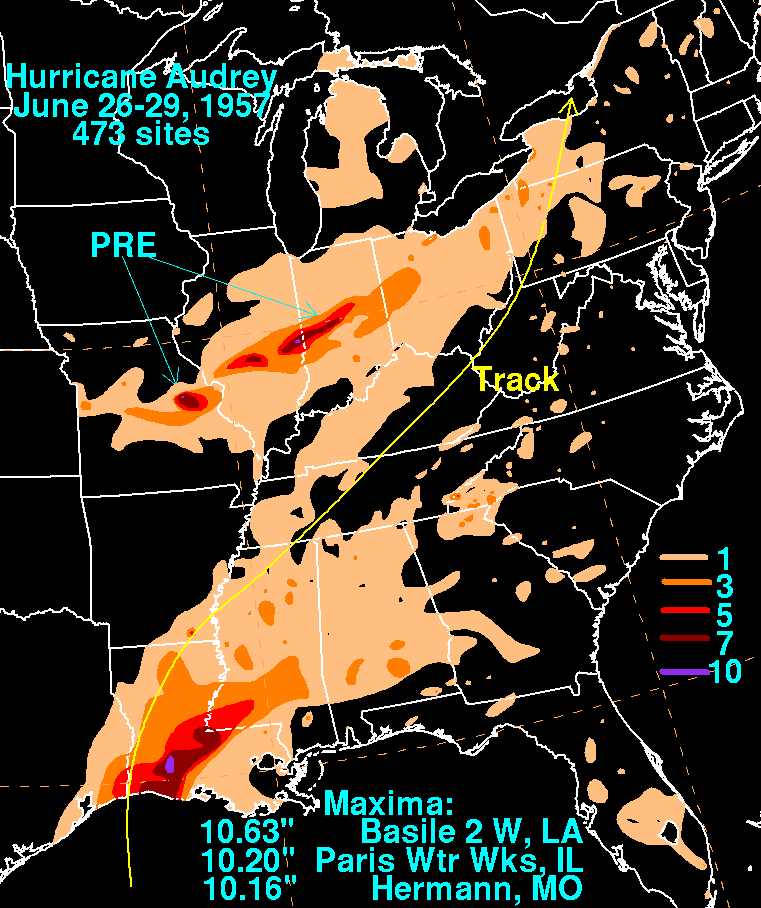
Rainfall caused by Audrey and a concurrent second disturbance over the Midwestern United States

Audrey produced severe weather, including 19 tornadoes, in its rainbands as it moved inland. 14 of the 19 tornadoes touched down in Alabama; a conducive environment over the southern half of the state took shape as Audrey passed to the northwest, resulting in a localized tornado outbreak causing $600,000 in damage and injuring 14 people. An F2 tornado struck Southern Greenville, damaging or destroying 60 buildings including some of the facilities at Lomax-Hannon Junior College; damage from that tornado alone was estimated to be as high as $300,000. Three tornadoes struck in the vicinity of Evergreen, Alabama, damaging several homes; one of the tornadoes was an F2 tornado that tracked 23.2 mi (37.3 km) and was 440 yd (400 m) wide, making it both the longest-tracked and widest tornado caused by Hurricane Audrey. Another F2 tornado near Evergreen also swept up fish and crayfish, causing them to fall from the sky. Strong winds in Montgomery, Alabama, uprooted trees, while 20 mi (32 km) south in Davenport, Alabama, winds damaged a number of homes and injured several people. Gusts in the state peaked at 71 mph (114 km/h) in Birmingham, Alabama, and wind damage alone caused $200,000 in damage in the state.

On the Mississippi Gulf Coast, winds and tidal action caused some damage. However, the most severe damage in Mississippi occurred in a band stretching from the southwestern to northeastern corner of the state. Four tornadoes touched down in Mississippi resulting in slightly over $500,000 in damage. An F2 tornado in Philadelphia destroyed seven homes and caused nine injuries, while an F3 tornado—the strongest caused by Audrey—killed one and injured 10 in Brooksville. The Brooksville tornado also destroyed a Kraft Singles plant in the western side of the city and hospitalized six people, with another four suffering minor injuries; damage from that tornado was estimated between $100,000–$300,000. Another F2 tornado destroyed a grocery store and several large buildings in Clara. The strongest winds in Mississippi were measured in Jackson and Greenwood, clocking at 52 mph (84 km/h). Mississippi's southwestern regions saw the heaviest rainfall in the state from Audrey, with rainfall totals ranging from 4–6 in (100–150 mm). Heavy rains caused minor flooding along the banks of the Pearl River and Big Black River, affecting some farm lands. One person was electrocuted in Kosciusko after attempting to upright a utility pole, bringing the number of fatalities in the state to two. The total cost of damage in the state was $9 million, and 50,000 homes sustained some form of damage. Loss of crops in Mississippi totaled $2 million with corn, cotton, hay, and unharvested oats heavily damaged. As was the case in Louisiana, boll weevil poisoning efforts were thwarted in Mississippi.

Damage from Audrey in Arkansas was limited to minor roof damage caused by strong winds in El Dorado. The fringe effects of Audrey's remnant wind field and rainfall also extended to Georgia, where wind damage was light but widespread. Peaches were blown down from trees and corn was blown over. Falling trees and branches damaged homes and disrupted electric and telecommunication services. Tracking farther inland, the weakening storm brought gusts of up to 50 mph (80 km/h) to Tennessee, Kentucky, and Ohio, resulting in minor wind damage. Rainfall in these states produced minor flooding along streams and low-lying farmland, exacerbated by antecedent rainfall that had saturated the soil. Across Tennessee, property or crop damage associated with strong winds was reported in eleven counties, with property damage mostly being inflicted on roofs, trees, power lines, TV antennas, and other minor structures; one death and three injuries were linked to these winds. An F1 tornado destroyed a saw mill, a barn, and several other buildings near Dyersburg, Tennessee, the most northerly tornado associated with Audrey.

The interaction of Audrey and a second frontal system tracking across the Midwestern United States drew excess moisture across the region, leading to heavy rainfall across Missouri, Illinois, and Indiana. Rainfall in those states peaked at 10.20 in (259 mm) in Paris, Illinois, with a similar maximum of 10.16 in (258 mm) in Hermann, Missouri. The rains in Paris, Illinois, contributed to the rainiest June in the city's history and a yearly record rainfall total. Highways in Illinois were submerged for as long as three days. Flash flooding in central Indiana led to the closure of 17 highways. Two women drowned after a bus was swept off one highway near Indianapolis, Indiana, where over 3 in (76 mm) of rain quickly fell. Another three drowned in Indiana, in addition to the inundation of over 1,000 homes and 125 businesses. Flooding washed away roughly 500,000 acres (200,000 hectares) of crops and destroyed highway and railroad bridges. An 18-car work train fell into a creek near Reelsville, Indiana, after the bridge it was crossing succumbed to floodwaters. Railroad losses alone accounted for $1.2 million of the $2.45 million in damage wrought by Audrey in Indiana.

A total of ten lives were lost in Illinois, Indiana, and New York due to heavy rains and strong winds brought by squalls in Audrey's extratropical remnants. Winds peaked at 65 mph (105 km/h) in Pittsburgh, Pennsylvania, and 100 mph (160 km/h) in Jamestown, New York. Damage in Pennsylvania was limited to the state's western regions and confined primarily to the downing of trees, powerlines, and the loss of some roofs. One person was killed by lightning while another was injured by a falling tree. Areas of New York near Lake Ontario experienced intense wind gusts that caused widespread power outages. The winds raised the water level in the lake 3 ft (90 cm) above normal, damaging small boats. The rise in Lake Ontario also damaged sightseeing facilities and river docks downstream of the Niagara Falls; total damage in New York was estimated at between $250,000–$400,000 and four deaths were reported in the state. Hurricane-force winds extended as far east as St. Albans, Vermont, where winds were measured at 80 mph (130 km/h). Across New England, power lines were downed while yachts were driven aground on the coast of Maine.

=== Canada ===
The remnants of Audrey entered Ontario with tropical storm force winds after crossing Lake Ontario, while gusts reached 80 mph (130 km/h). Heavy rainfall in the province washed out roads and rail lines. Six people were trapped in Algonquin Provincial Park for four days due to dangerous river currents and downed trees blocking roads. One boy drowned and a firefighter died due to the storm, while three other people died in Ontario due to traffic accidents. In neighboring Quebec, the remnants of Audrey were considered the worst storm in about 20 years, and over 100 houses were damaged by floods. The Montreal district of Saraguay lost power for several days. Throughout Montreal, there were 10 deaths, nine of which due to traffic accidents. This made Audrey the deadliest tropical cyclone in Quebec on record.

== Aftermath ==
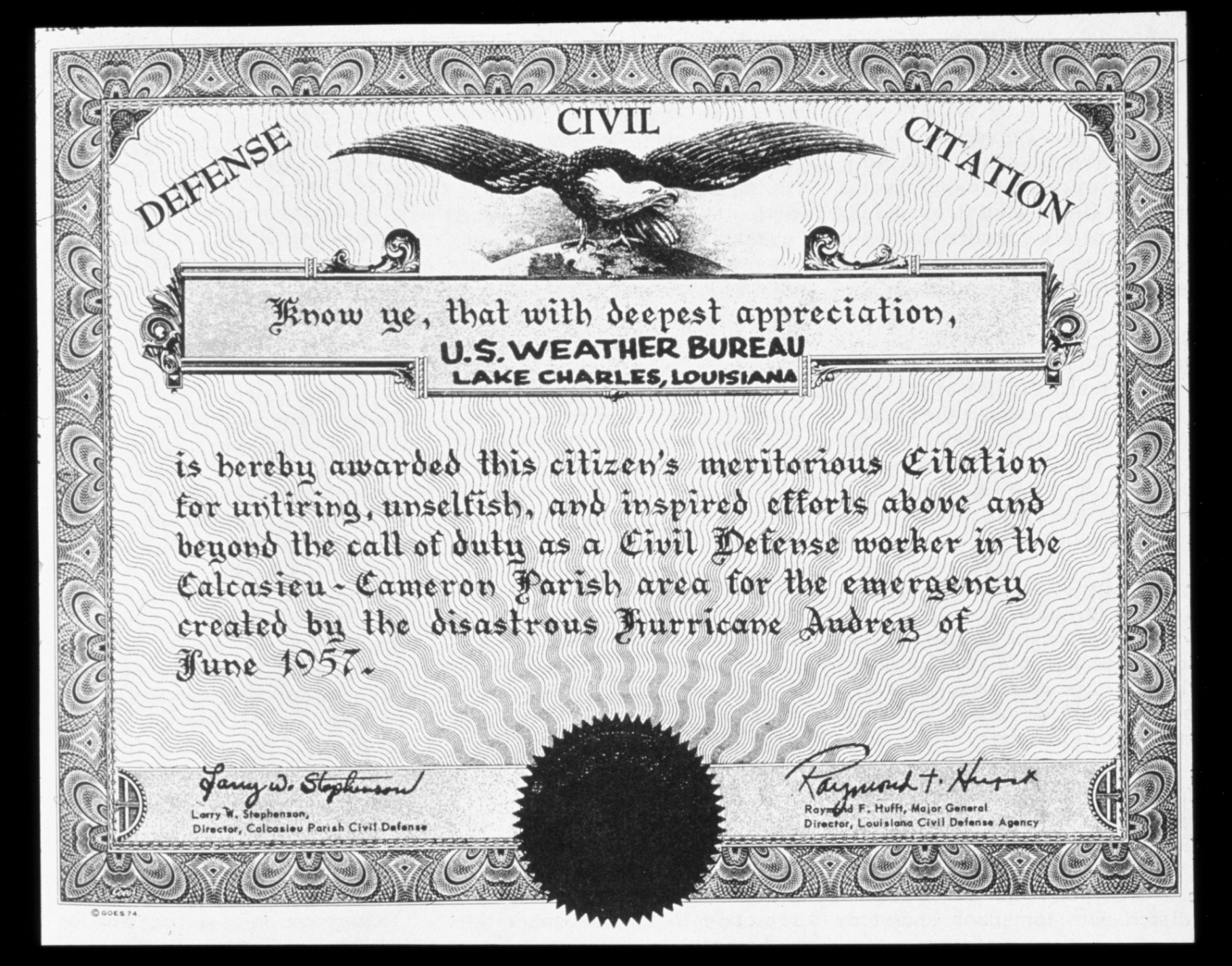
A meritorious citation awarded by the Louisiana Civil Defense Agency to the Weather Bureau office in Lake Charles, Louisiana in the aftermath of Hurricane Audrey

Rescue parties from the United States Coast Guard were quickly dispatched for the Cameron area in search for survivors. The Coast Guard also dispatched a cutter from New Orleans with medical supplies for affected regions. More than 40,000 people were left homeless, with many were housed at McNeese State University in Lake Charles until they could be permanently resettled. Statues were erected in honor of those killed by Audrey in southwestern Louisiana, including Highland Memorial Park in Lake Charles where 33 were buried.

Audrey's storm surge on the Louisiana coastline began receding 10 hours after the storm struck, with the ocean returning to normal levels in around 1.5 days. Despite the brief period of submersion, the morphology of the coast changed significantly; about 50% of the coast had retreated inland, with a large amount of sedimentation occurring primarily in the form of mudflats. One arc of mud deposited on the coast measured 11,350 ft (3,460 m) in length and 1,000 ft (300 m) in width. In Rockefeller Wildlife Refuge, saltwater inundation of habitats led to a significant decrease in waterfowl and plants susceptible to saltwater like bullwhips; damage in the refuge set back management and development plans for the area by two years. Other plants intolerant to saltwater sustained a four-year decrease in productivity. Nutria, muskrat, raccoon, rabbit, and deer populations experienced 60% mortality, while mink and otters fared comparatively better. All animal nests were swept away by either the rough surf or strong winds.

The destruction wrought by Audrey on Cameron, Louisiana, was credited as contributing to the successful evacuation of Cameron Parish in advance of Hurricane Carla four years later, with the parish having a higher evacuation rate (96%) than any other location surveyed in the aftermath of Carla despite being at the edge of the warning area; however, the relevance of the so-called "Audrey effect" in the Carla evacuations is disputed.

The extensive storm surge caused by the hurricane represented the first research opportunity for the newly formed National Hurricane Research Project (NHRP) to investigate a major tropical cyclone inundation event since the organization's inception in 1954. After investigating the extent of the surge, the NHRP concluded that despite the abundant availability of storm tide observations, a lack of inland information prevented a detailed reconstruction of Audrey's surge; such data would help inform local emergency decisions and improve surge forecasting. Following the guidance of the NHRP, the Weather Bureau began installing additional tide recorders along the coast after Hurricane Audrey.

Due to the damage and fatalities caused by Audrey, the name was retired and will never be used again for an Atlantic tropical cyclone.

=== Bartie v. United States (1963) ===
In 1962, Whitney Bartie, along with hundreds of others, sued the United States federal government, asserting that the United States Weather Bureau had failed to give proper and accurate warning on Audrey and its effects. Bartie and his family had concluded that there was no need to evacuate following a 10:00 p.m. CST news broadcast on June 26—the night before Audrey made landfall. The family was awoken the following morning by water flooding their house, forcing them to climb onto their roof; the winds and rising water killed all in Bartie's family except Whitney. Whitney's claim was two-pronged, with the first point alleging that the Weather Bureau was negligent in their warnings, and the second alleging that despite experiencing the full brunt of the storm, Weather Bureau advisories advising the evacuation of those at lower elevations did not implicate him; Whitney sought $360,000 in damages from the federal government. A hurricane expert testifying for the Weather Bureau suggested that Audrey's deviation from the forecast path were as accurate as could be expected; at the time, the track error on a 24-hour hurricane forecast averaged 100–125 mi (161–201 km).

The case was argued in the United States District Court for the Western District of Louisiana and presided by Edwin F. Hunter. The court ruled that the Weather Bureau failed to convey the urgency of the situation to those on the coast in their warnings, but asserted that evacuation orders were not within the duties of the Weather Bureau. The case was dismissed on the grounds that the claim was barred by the discretionary function and misrepresentation exception in the Federal Tort Claims Act as the Weather Bureau's warnings were based on subjective judgements and errors were unintentional; thus, Hunter ruled that Whitney had failed to establish negligence on the part of the Weather Bureau. Following the dismissal, Whitney appealed the case to the United States Court of Appeals for the Fifth Circuit, which ruled per curiam in favor of the United States in Bartie v. United States 326 F.2d 754 (1964). Another 109 suits similar to Bartie seeking total damages of $9,755,000 were filed in federal court but did not come to trial.

== See also ==
- List of Texas hurricanes (1950–79)
- List of Category 3 Atlantic hurricanes
- Other tropical cyclones named Audrey

Storms affecting similar areas:

- Hurricane Carmen (1974) – A Category 4 hurricane that devastated the Yucatán Peninsula and southern Louisiana
- Hurricane Rita (2005) – A Category 5 hurricane that caused major damage as a Category 3 hurricane in southwestern Louisiana and southeastern Texas
- Hurricane Laura (2020) – A devastating Category 4 hurricane that caused widespread destruction across western Louisiana and eastern Texas

Other strong early-season hurricanes:

- 1909 Velasco hurricane – A Category 3 hurricane that devastated the Texas coast
- 1916 Gulf Coast hurricane – A destructive Category 3 hurricane that struck the central Gulf Coast of the United States
- Hurricane Beryl (2024) – A record-breaking Category 5 hurricane that moved through the Caribbean Sea
