= List of storms named Audrey =

The name Audrey has been used for four tropical cyclones worldwide: one in the Atlantic Ocean, one in the South-West Indian Ocean, and two in the Australian region.

In the Atlantic:

- Hurricane Audrey (1957) – Category 3 hurricane that devesteted the southwestern Louisiana coast, killing at least 416 people

The name Audrey was retired by the U.S. Weather Bureau following the 1957 season.

In the South-West Indian:

- Moderate Tropical Storm Audrey (1975) - made landfall in Madagascar, no damage or fatalities reported

In the Australian region:

- Cyclone Audrey (1964)
- Cyclone Audrey-Bonnie (1969)
