= Rockefeller Wildlife Refuge =

Nature reserve in Louisiana, USA

Coordinates: 29.646°N 92.678°W

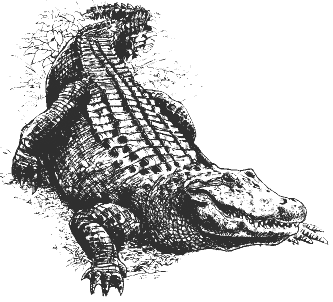
American alligator

The Rockefeller Wildlife Refuge is a large area of marshland in Cameron Parish and Vermilion Parish, Louisiana, United States. It was donated to the state with certain provisions as to its management as a wildlife sanctuary. It is a biodiverse habitat and is visited annually by many migratory birds. Much research is undertaken into marshland management and alligator ranching, and the income from the sale of alligators contributes to conservation of the marshland.

== History ==
On July 12, 1913, naturalist and businessman Edward Avery McIlhenny bought about 86,000 acres of marshland in Louisiana with the help of donated money. The following year, on May 20, 1914, the land was sold to the Rockefeller Foundation for the preservation and protection of migratory birds. The Rockefeller Foundation entrusted control of the land to the Conservation Commission of Louisiana for a period of five years. After this was successfully completed, the land was donated to the state, and in 1920 became the Rockefeller Wildlife Refuge. During the early years the marsh was patrolled to prevent poaching and the land was periodically burnt to encourage the growth of suitable fodder for muskrats and geese. The expenses of the Refuge were at least partly met by the sale of muskrat pelts.

The primary aim of the project was to conserve the wetlands habitat, particularly water fowl. The provisions of the bequest stipulated that all revenue must be ploughed back into the project. Fur–bearing mammals, waterfowl and alligators could be cropped on a sustainable basis and these and the oil available underground have been carefully harvested and have provided a steady source of income. In the 1960s, the commission used these funds for a pioneering program of alligator management with the whole area becoming, in effect, a vast alligator ranch.

== The refuge ==
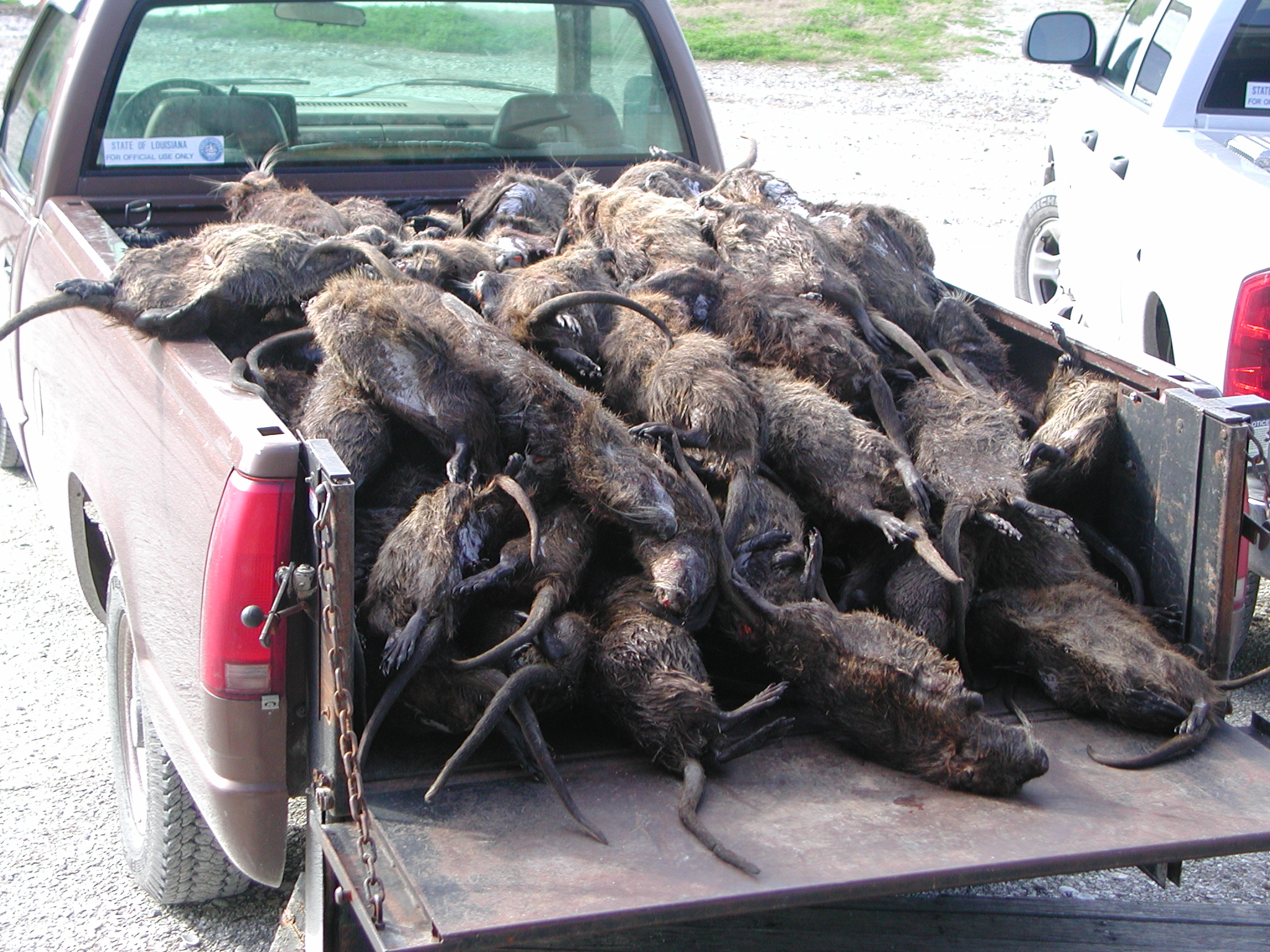
Nutria control is sometimes necessary to prevent damage to the levees

The Rockefeller Wildlife Refuge occupies a strip of low-lying flat treeless land adjoining the Gulf of Mexico for 26.5 miles (42.6 km) and extending inland for about 6 miles (9.7 km) to the Grand Chenier Ridge, a marine terrace. The original 86,000 acres of the site have been reduced to about 76,000 by coastal erosion along the gulf. It is one of the most biodiverse wildlife areas in the United States.

When the Rockfeller Foundation donated the land it stipulated that:

- The property must be maintained as a wildlife refuge.
- The boundaries must be posted.
- Enforcement agents must protect the area from trespassers and poachers.
- No public taking of fish or animals to be allowed.
- The refuge staff must study and manage the property for wildlife.
- Mineral revenues must be used on behalf of the refuge with any surplus going towards education or public health.

Animals resident in the refuge all year round include mottled ducks, rails, nutria, muskrat, raccoon, mink, otter, opossum, white-tailed deer and alligators. Large numbers of migratory birds including about 160,000 waterfowl visit it each year including geese, ducks, coots, shorebirds and wading birds. Fish present include redfish, speckled trout, black drum and largemouth bass. Some recreational fishing is permitted but no hunting is allowed, although some animals are trapped if their populations seem to be getting out of control.

There are eleven impoundments on the site with some method of water control. Levees and sluice gates are built and maintained so as to divide the land into areas with varying degrees of salinity. The land is managed so as to stabilise water levels as far as possible. A reduction in the level of salinity in some areas encourages the growth of submerged aquatic and annual plants which provide suitable habitat for wildfowl. Some mineral developments have been allowed to produce revenue but these have been managed so as to minimise their impact on the environment. The research centre employs biologists, conservation officers and maintenance staff.

== Management ==
The Rockefeller Wildlife Refuge is best known for its pioneering research into alligators, their natural history, their requirements and ranching. Some aspects covered include penning, stocking rates, egg incubation, hatching, rearing and diet. This information has been used by other crocodilian farms and ranches around the world. Brown pelican and bald eagle restoration projects are managed from here and striped bass are raised for distribution to river systems in the west of the state. Other research studies include wildfowl habitat management, marsh management, various wildlife projects, alligator snapping turtles and how to reduce the impact of mineral extraction in wetlands.

The refuge is visited each year by more than 100,000 people. Many are students and members of organisations who come to learn about wildlife conservation at the study centre which can provide lodging and laboratory facilities. Others are attracted by the opportunities for bird watching and recreational fishing, shrimping and crabbing. Each year, the refuge holds a controlled alligator harvest for alligator hunters with specific permits, tags, and licenses.
