= List of cities in Grenada =

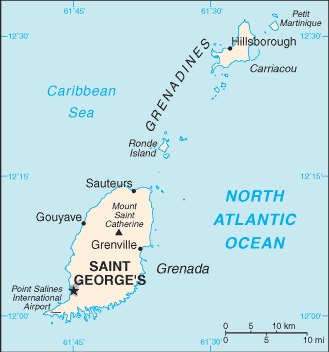
Map of Grenada

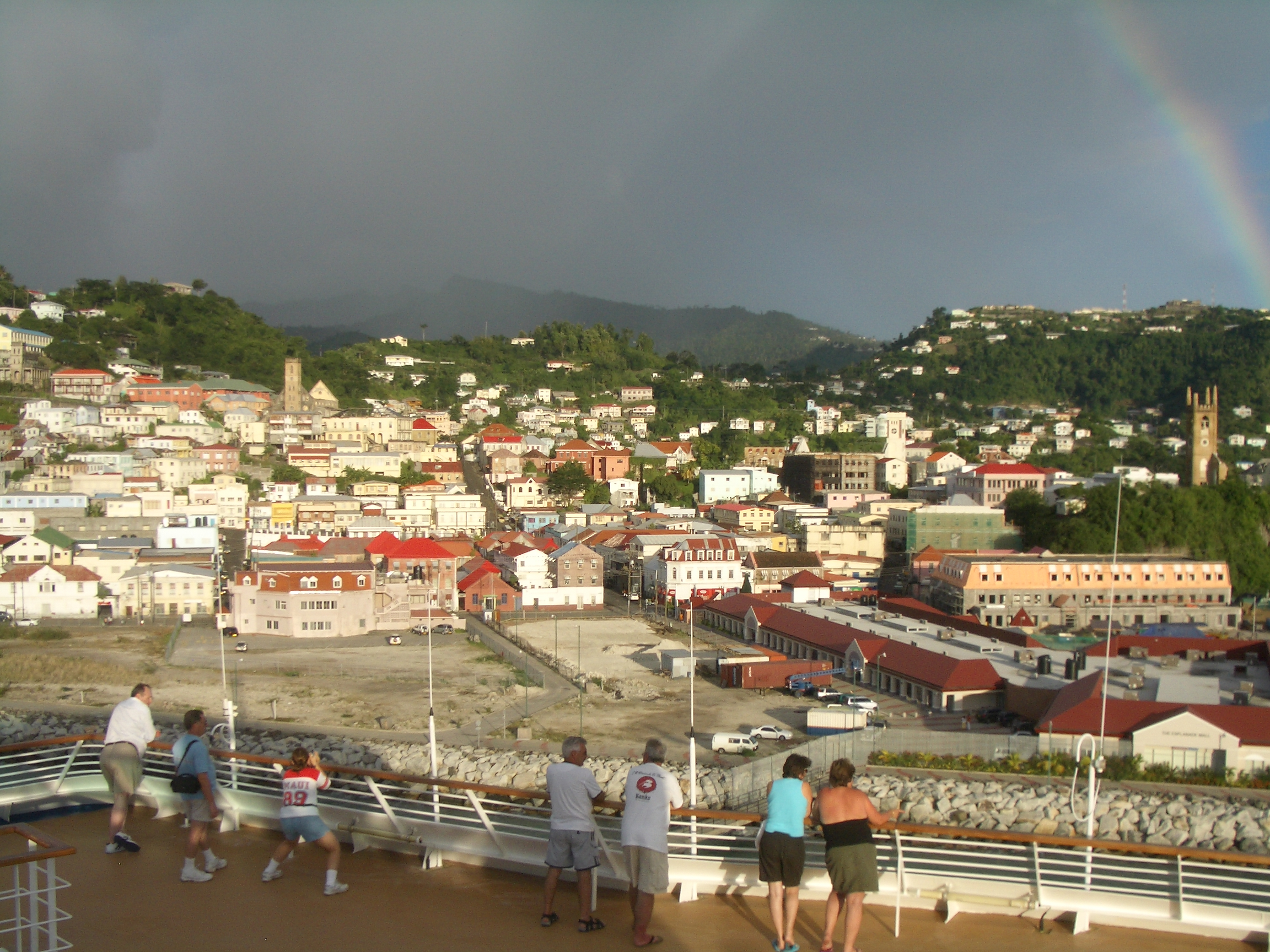
St. George's, Capital of Grenada

This is a list of towns, villages and populated places in Grenada. Grenada is an island nation in the south-eastern Caribbean Sea. It consists of the island of Grenada and six smaller islands at the southern end of the Grenadines island chain. There is only one city in Grenada, which is the capital, St. George's.

- Amber Belair
- Après Tout
- Bacaye
- Bacolet
- Balthazar
- Blaize
- Barique
- Bathway
- Beaton
- Beaulieu
- Becke Moui
- Bellevue
- Belmont
- Birch Grove
- Boca
- Bogles
- Bois de Gannes
- Bonaire
- Beausejour
- Calivigny
- Chantimelle
- Chutz
- Clabony
- Crochu
- Deblando
- Debra
- Diego Piece
- Dunfermline
- Elie Hall
- Fond
- Gouyave
- Grand Bras
- Granlette
- Grand Roy St.John
- Grand Bra
- Great Crayfish
- Great Palmiste St.John
- Great Pond
- Grenville
- Hillsborough
- Ka-fe Beau
- L'Anse Aux Epines
- La Fortune
- La Filette
- La Mode
- L Qua Qua
- La Sagesse
- Soubise
- La Tante
- La Taste
- Mamma Cannes
- Maulti
- Morne Fendue
- Morne Jaloux Ridge
- Morne Longue
- Morne Rouge
- Morne Tranquille
- Mount Craven
- Mount Horne
- Mount Parnasus
- Munich
- Paraclete
- Paradise
- Petit Bacaye
- Perdmontemps
- Prospect
- Resource
- St. George's
- Sauteurs
- St. David's
- San Souci
- Telescope
- Tivoli
- Union
- Union Village
- Upper Capitol
- Upper Conference
- Upper La Tante
- Upper La Taste
- Upper Pearls
- Victoria
- Waltham
- Westerhall
- Willis
