= Geography of Grenada =

Grenada
Nickname: The Spice Isle
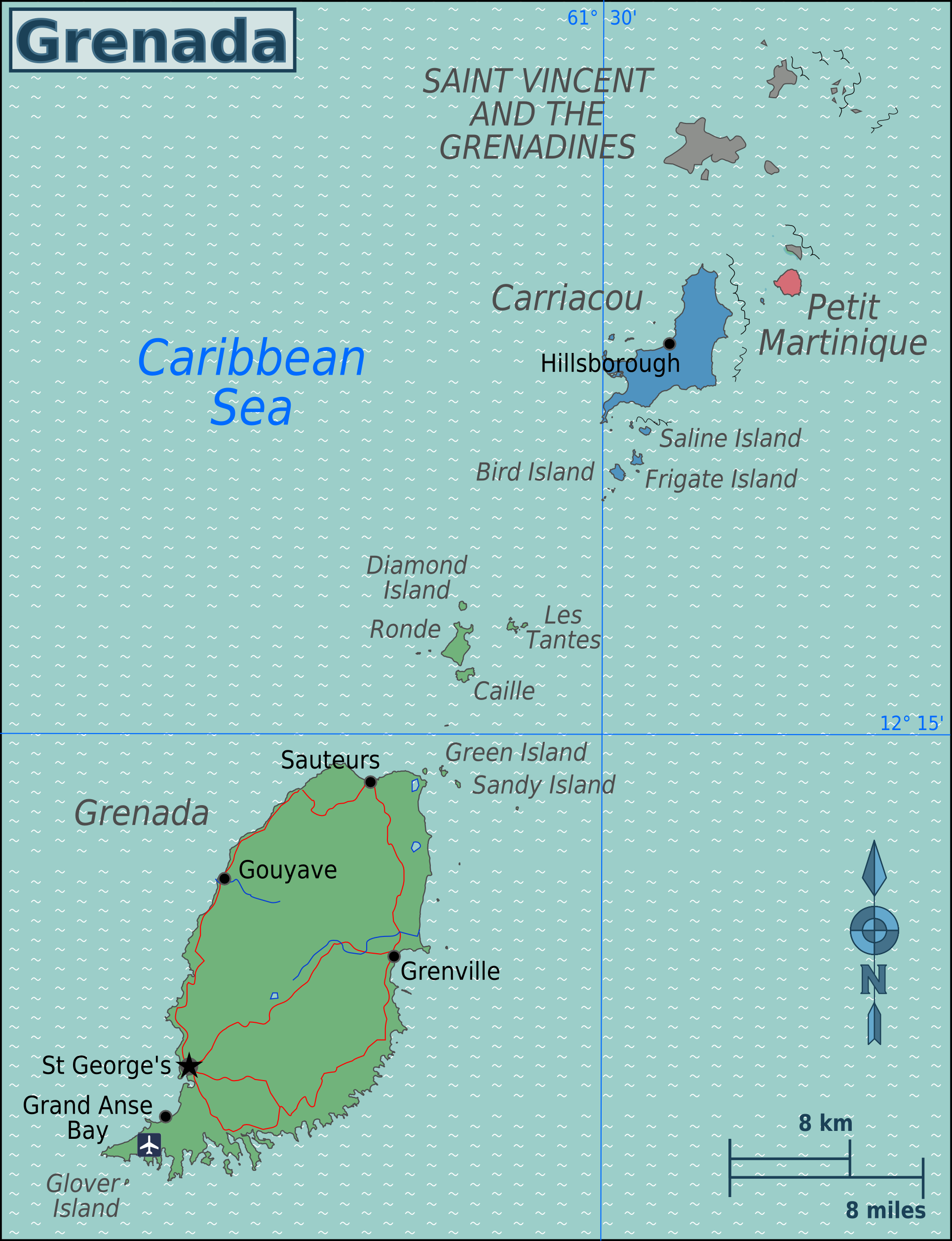
- Map of Grenada

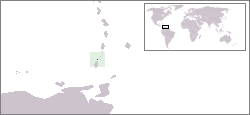

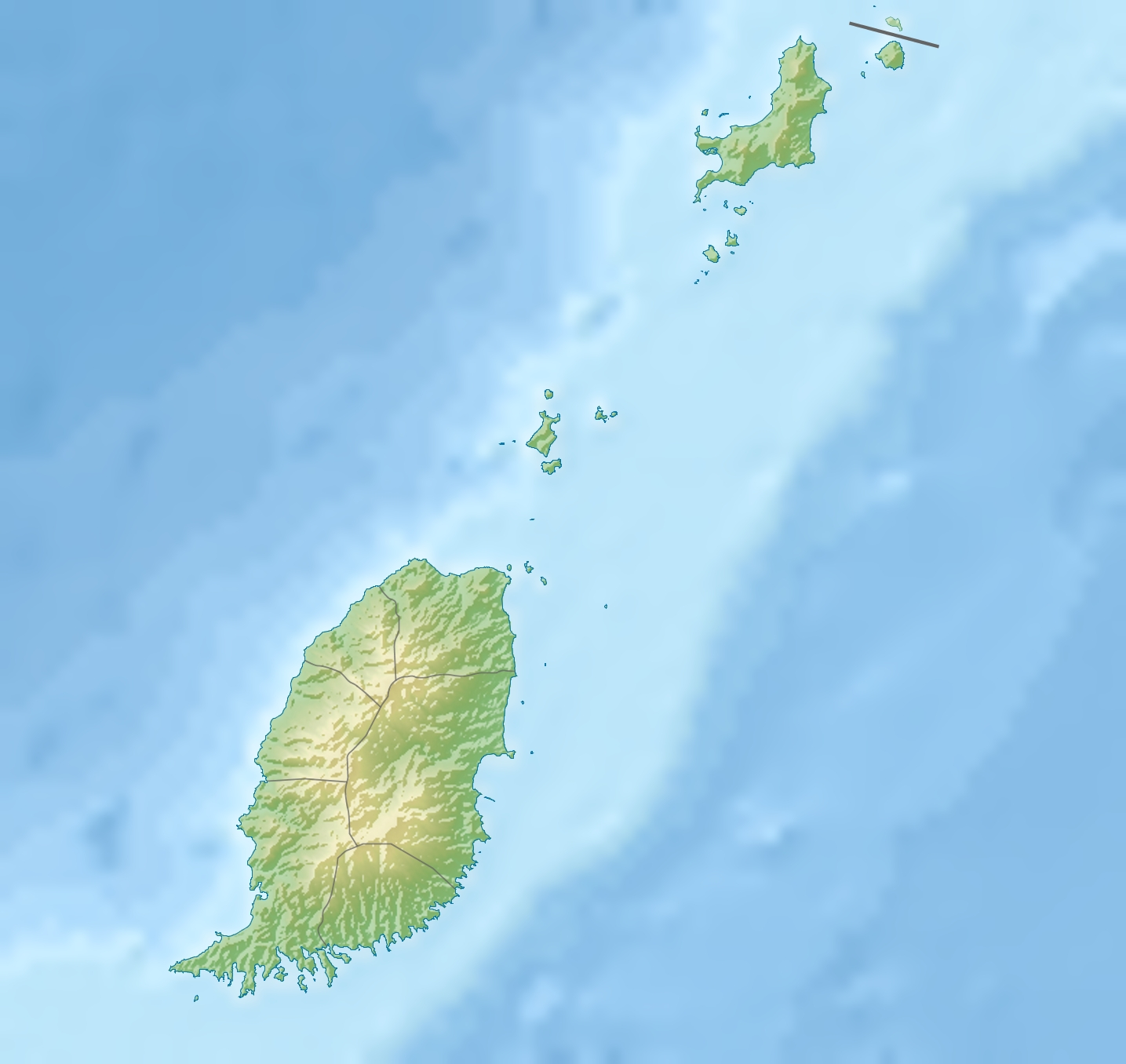
- Location within Grenada Location within Lesser Antilles Location within the Caribbean

Geography
- Location: Caribbean Sea
- Coordinates: 12°07′N 61°40′W
- Archipelago: Grenadines
- Area: 344.5 km^{2} (133.0 sq mi)
- Length: 21 km (13 mi)
- Width: 12 km (7.5 mi)
- Coastline: 121 km (75.2 mi)
- Highest elevation: 870 m (2850 ft)
- Highest point: Mount St. Catherine

Administration
- Grenada
- Largest settlement: St. George's (pop. 7,500)

Demographics
- Population: 109,100 (2012)
- Pop. density: 313/km^{2} (811/sq mi)
- Languages: English (official), Grenadian Creole
- Ethnic groups: Blacks 82% Mulatto 12% South Asians (Indo-Grenadians) 3% and whites 2.9%, trace Arawak/Carib Amerindian

Grenada is an island country located between the Caribbean Sea and Atlantic Ocean, north of Trinidad and Tobago. It is located at 12°07′N 61°40′W. There are no large inland bodies of water on the island, which consists entirely of the state of Grenada. The coastline is 121 km long. The island has 15 constituencies and speaks English and Grenadian Creole. It is volcanic in origin and its topography is mountainous.

Natural resources include timber, tropical fruit and deepwater harbours.

Grenada and its largely uninhabited outlying territories are the most southerly of the Windward Islands. The Grenadine Islands chain consists of some 600 islets; those south of the Martinique Channel belong to Grenada, while those north of the channel are part of the nation of St. Vincent and the Grenadines. Located about 160 kilometers north of Venezuela, at approximately 12° north latitude and 61° west longitude, Grenada and its territories occupy a small area of 433 square kilometers. Grenada, known as the Spice Isle because of its production of nutmeg and mace, is the largest at 310 square kilometers, or about the size of the city of Detroit. The island is oval shaped and framed by a jagged southern coastline; its maximum width is thirty-four kilometers, and its maximum length is nineteen kilometers. St. George's, the capital and the nation's most important harbour, is favorably situated near a lagoon on the southwestern coast. Of all the islands belonging to Grenada, only two are of consequence: Carriacou, with a population of a few thousand, and its neighbour Petit Martinique, roughly 40 kilometers northeast of Grenada and populated by some 700 inhabitants.

== Terrain ==
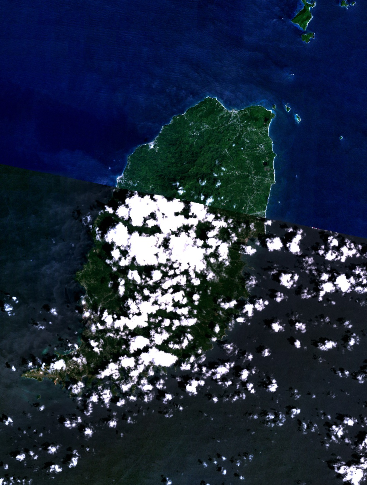
Grenada - NASA NLT Landsat 7 (Visible Colour) Satellite Image

Part of the volcanic chain in the Lesser Antilles arc, Grenada and its possessions generally vary in elevation from under 300 meters to over 600 meters above sea level. Grenada is more rugged and densely foliated than its outlying possessions, but other geographical conditions are more similar. Grenada's landmass rises from a narrow, coastal plain in a generally north–south trending axis of ridges and narrow valleys. Mount St. Catherine is the highest peak at 840 meters.

Although many of the rocks and soils are of volcanic origin, the volcanic cones dotting Grenada are long dormant. The only known active volcano in the area is Kick 'em Jenny, just north between Grenada and Carriacou. Some of the drainage features on Grenada remain from its volcanic past. There are a few crater lakes, the largest of which is Grand Etang. The swift upper reaches of rivers, which occasionally overflow and cause flooding and landslides, generally cut deeply into the conic slopes. By contrast, many of the water courses in the lowlands tend to be sluggish and meandering.

== Table of Islands ==
Nr	Island	Capital	Other Cities	Area (km^{2})	Population (Note: The Islands area and population data retrieved from the 2012 census)
1	Grenadines (Southern)	Hillsborough	Grand Bay	37.77	8150
1.1	Carriacou	Hillsborough	Lauriston, Grand Bay,	34	7200
1.2	Frigate Island			0.39	0
1.3	Large Island			0.5	0
1.4	Petit Martinique	North beach	Piton hill, southwest beach	2.37	950
1.5	Saline Island	John Family mansion		0.28	0
1.6	White Island	Limekiln Bay		0.05	0
1.7	More Islands	Petit Dominica	Mabouya, Sandy, little Tobago	0.18	0
2	Grenada Island	St. George's	St. David's, Grenville, Sauteurs, Victoria, Gouyave,	306.00	100930
3	Saint Patrick Parish Islands	Sauteurs		4.28	2
3.1	Bird Island			0.03	0
3.2	Caille Island	West beach	Whale bay	0.70	0
3.3	Diamond Island	southwest point		0.22	0
3.4	Green Island			0.14	0
3.5	Les Tantes	Grand Tantes	Petit Tantes	0.3	0
3.6	Ronde Island	South dock	Corn Store Bay	2.70	0
3.7	Sandy Island	west beach		0.11	0
3.8	Sugarloaf Island	Southwest point mansion		0.08	2
4	Saint George Parish Islands	St. George's		0.69	20
4.1	Hog Island	west beach		0.35	0
4.2	Calivigny Island	Port Calivigny south		0.28	20
4.3	Glover Island	Degra Bay		0.06	0
	Grenada and the Grenadines	St. George's	St. David's, Grenville, Sauteurs, Gouyave, Hillsborough,	348.5	109102

== Climate ==
The Grenadian climate is tropical, tempered by northeast trade winds.

The abundance of water is primarily caused by the tropical, wet climate. Yearly precipitation, largely generated by the warm and moisture-laden northeasterly trade winds, varies from more than 3,500 millimeters (137.8 in) on the windward mountainsides to less than 1,500 millimeters (59.1 in) in the lowlands. The greatest monthly totals are recorded throughout Grenada from June through November, the months when tropical storms and hurricanes are most likely to occur. Rainfall is less pronounced from December through May, when the equatorial low-pressure system moves south. Similarly, the highest humidities, usually close to 80 percent, are recorded during the rainy months, and values from 68 to 78 percent are registered during the drier period. Temperatures averaging 29 °C (84.2 °F) are constant throughout the year, however, with slightly higher readings in the lowlands. Nevertheless, diurnal ranges within a 24-hour period are appreciable: between 26 and 32 °C (78.8 and 89.6 °F) during the day and between 19 and 24 °C (66.2 and 75.2 °F) at night.

Climate data for St. George's, Grenada
Month	Jan	Feb	Mar	Apr	May	Jun	Jul	Aug	Sep	Oct	Nov	Dec	Year
Mean daily maximum °C (°F)	30.0 (86.0)	30.0 (86.0)	31.0 (87.8)	31.0 (87.8)	31.0 (87.8)	31.0 (87.8)	31.0 (87.8)	31.0 (87.8)	31.0 (87.8)	31.0 (87.8)	31.0 (87.8)	30.0 (86.0)	30.8 (87.4)
Daily mean °C (°F)	26.0 (78.8)	26.0 (78.8)	26.5 (79.7)	27.0 (80.6)	27.5 (81.5)	27.5 (81.5)	27.5 (81.5)	27.5 (81.5)	27.5 (81.5)	27.5 (81.5)	27.0 (80.6)	26.5 (79.7)	27.1 (80.8)
Mean daily minimum °C (°F)	22.0 (71.6)	22.0 (71.6)	22.0 (71.6)	23.0 (73.4)	24.0 (75.2)	24.0 (75.2)	24.0 (75.2)	24.0 (75.2)	24.0 (75.2)	24.0 (75.2)	23.0 (73.4)	23.0 (73.4)	23.4 (74.1)
Average precipitation mm (inches)	115.0 (4.53)	80.0 (3.15)	65.0 (2.56)	70.0 (2.76)	115.0 (4.53)	220.0 (8.66)	230.0 (9.06)	220.0 (8.66)	200.0 (7.87)	245.0 (9.65)	245.0 (9.65)	175.0 (6.89)	1,980 (77.97)
Average rainy days (≥ 1.0 mm)	14	9	10	7	13	17	20	18	17	20	20	18	183
Average relative humidity (%)	84	81	80	80	81	83	84	85	85	86	87	85	83
Mean daily sunshine hours	8	8	8	8	8	7	7	8	7	7	7	7	8
Source 1: Intellicast.com
Source 2: Climatestotravel.com (precipitation, rainy days, humidity, sun)

== Statistics ==
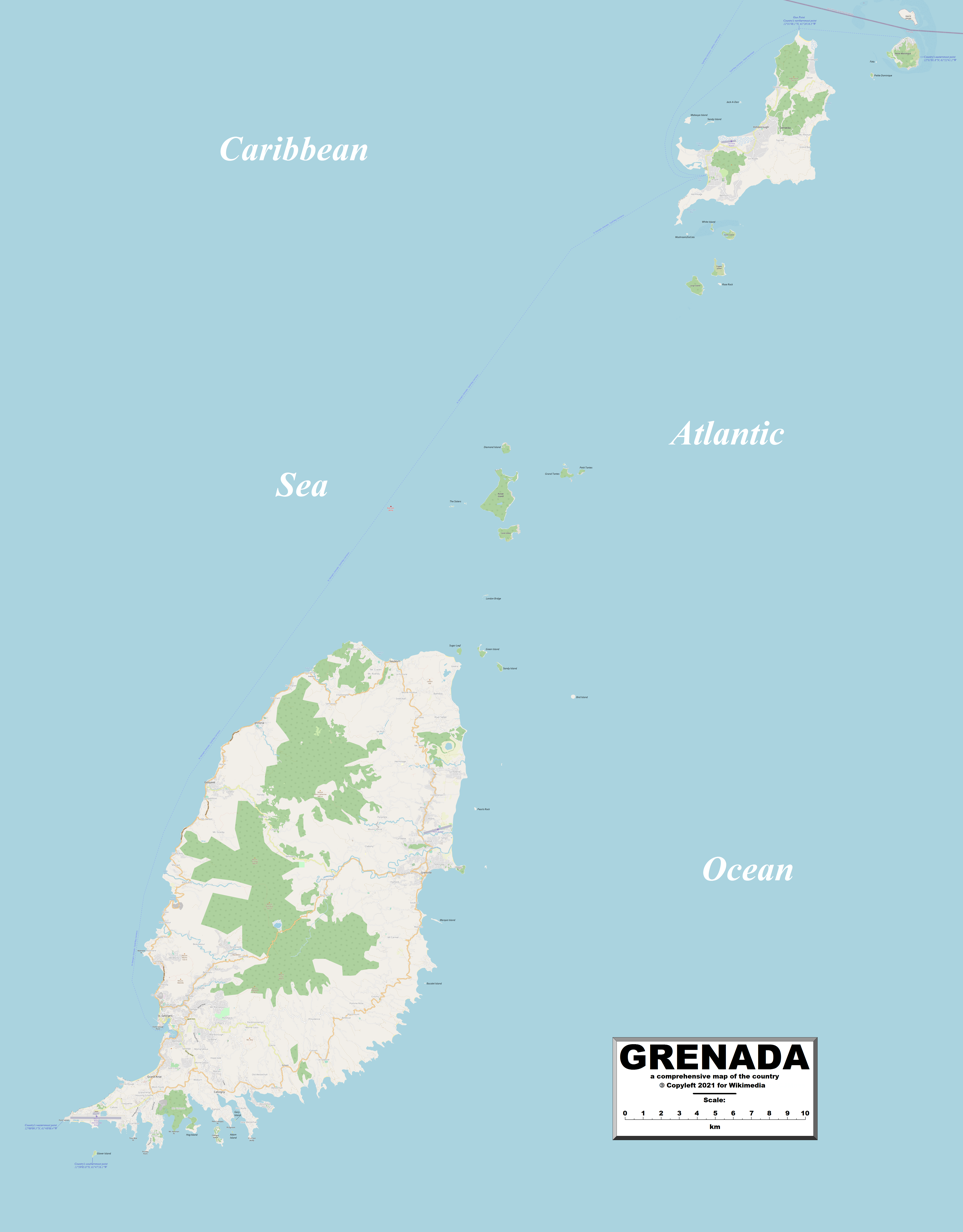
An enlargeable, detailed map of Grenada

Area
- Total: 348.5 km²
- Land: 344 km²
Maritime claims
- Territorial sea: 12 nmi (22.2 km; 13.8 mi)
- Exclusive economic zone: 27,426 km^{2} (10,589.2 mi^{2}) and 200 nmi (370.4 km; 230.2 mi)
Land use
- Arable land: 8.82%
- Permanent crops: 20.59%
- Other: 70.59% (2012 est.)
Irrigated land
2.19 km² (2003)
Natural hazards
Lies on edge of hurricane belt; hurricane season lasts from June to November
Extreme points

- Northernmost point – Gun Point, Carriacou
- Northernmost point (Grenada only) - Tanga Langue, Saint Patrick Parish
- Easternmost point – east coast of Petite Martinique island
- Easternmost point (Grenada only) - Artiste Point, Saint Andrew Parish
- Southernmost point – Glover Island, Saint George Parish
- Southernmost point (Grenada only) - Prickly Point, Saint George Parish
- Westernmost point – Point Salines, Saint George Parish
- Highest point – Mount Saint Catherine: 840 m
- Lowest point – Caribbean Sea: 0 m

Environment - international agreements
Party to: Biodiversity, Climate Change, Desertification, Endangered Species, Law of the Sea, Ozone Layer Protection, Whaling
Geography - note
The administration of the islands of the Grenadines group is divided between Saint Vincent and the Grenadines (northern Grenadines) and Grenada (southern Grenadines)

== See also ==
- Grenadines
- List of cities in Grenada
- List of islands of Grenada
- List of rivers of Grenada
- List of volcanoes in Grenada
- Parishes of Grenada
