= List of airports in Grenada =

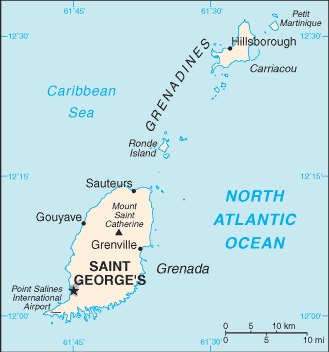
Map of Grenada

This is a list of airports in Grenada.

Grenada is an island country and sovereign state in the southeastern Caribbean Sea. It consists of the island of Grenada and smaller islands at the southern end of the Grenadines, including Carriacou, Petit Martinique, Ronde Island, Caille Island, Diamond Island, Large Island, Saline Island, and Frigate Island. The main island of Grenada is divided into six parishes. The capital is St. George's. Grenada is located northwest of Trinidad and Tobago, northeast of Venezuela, and southwest of Saint Vincent and the Grenadines.

== Airports ==
Airport names shown in bold indicate the airport has scheduled service on commercial airlines.

City served	Parish	Island	ICAO	IATA	Airport name	Coordinates
St. George's	Saint George	Grenada	TGPY	GND	**Maurice Bishop International Airport**	12°00′15″N 061°47′10″W
Grenville	Saint Andrew	Grenada	TGPG		Pearls Airport (closed)	12°08′37″N 061°37′00″W
Hillsborough		Carriacou	TGPZ	CRU	**Lauriston Airport** (Carriacou Island Airport)	12°28′37″N 061°28′20″W

== See also ==
- SVG Air
- Transport in Grenada
- List of airports by ICAO code: T#TG - Grenada
- Wikipedia: WikiProject Aviation/Airline destination lists: North America#Grenada
