= ISO 3166-2:GD =

Entry for Grenada in ISO 3166-2

ISO 3166-2:GD is the entry for Grenada in ISO 3166-2, part of the ISO 3166 standard published by the International Organization for Standardization (ISO), which defines codes for the names of the principal subdivisions (e.g., provinces or states) of all countries coded in ISO 3166-1.

Currently for Grenada, ISO 3166-2 codes are defined for six parishes and one dependency.

Each code consists of two parts, separated by a hyphen. The first part is GD, the ISO 3166-1 alpha-2 code of Grenada. The second part is two digits:

- 01–06: parishes (all on the island of Grenada)
- 10: dependency (Carriacou and Petite Martinique, in the southern part of the Grenadines)

== Current codes ==
Subdivision names are listed as in the ISO 3166-2 standard published by the ISO 3166 Maintenance Agency (ISO 3166/MA).

Click on the button in the header to sort each column.

Code	Subdivision name (en)	Local variant	Subdivision category
GD-01	Saint Andrew		parish
GD-02	Saint David		parish
GD-03	Saint George		parish
GD-04	Saint John		parish
GD-05	Saint Mark		parish
GD-06	Saint Patrick		parish
GD-10	Southern Grenadine Islands	Carriacou	dependency

== Changes ==
The following changes to the entry have been announced in newsletters by the ISO 3166/MA since the first publication of ISO 3166-2 in 1998:

Newsletter	Date issued	Description of change in newsletter	Code/Subdivision change
Newsletter I-8	2007-04-17	Addition of the administrative subdivisions and of their code elements	Subdivisions added: 6 parishes, 1 dependency

== See also ==
- Subdivisions of Grenada
- FIPS region codes of Grenada
