= Economy of Grenada =

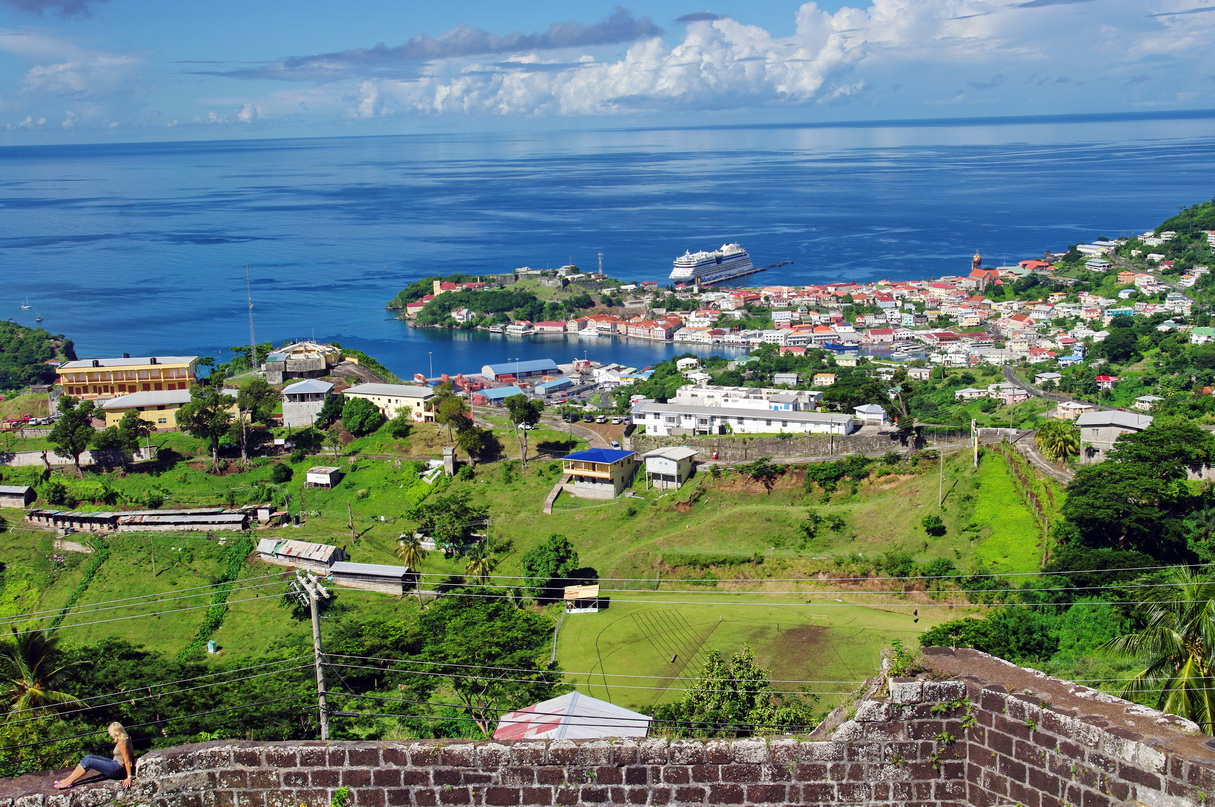
- St. George's is the economic centre of Grenada
- Currency: East Caribbean dollar (XCD)
- Trade organisations: CARICOM

Statistics
- GDP: ▲$1.18 billion (nominal, 2018); ▲$1.73 billion (PPP, 2018))
- GDP growth: ▼ −9.6% (2020f); ▲6.5% (2021f)
- GDP per capita: ▲$10,939 (nominal, 2018 est.); ▲$15,996 (PPP, 2018 est.)
- GDP by sector: agriculture: 11%; industry: 20%; services: 69% (2008 est.)
- Inflation (CPI): ▼0.80% (2018)
- Population below national poverty line: 38% (2008 est.)
- Human Development Index: ▲0.763 high (2018) (78th); N/A IHDI (2018)
- Labour force: 59,900 (2013 est.)
- Labour force by occupation: agriculture 11%, industry 20%, services 69% (2008 est.)
- Unemployment: 33.5% (2008 est.)
- Main industries: nutmeg, bananas, cocoa, fruit and vegetables, clothing, mace

External
- Exports: $43.8 million (2015 est.)
- Export goods: nutmeg, bananas, cocoa, fruit and vegetables, clothing, mace
- Main export partners: United States 29.9%; Saint Vincent and the Grenadines 11.6%; France 6.96%; Germany 5.39%; Trinidad and Tobago 5.32% (2021)
- Imports: $310.4 million (2015 est.)
- Import goods: food, manufactured goods, machinery, chemicals, fuel
- Main import partners: United States 34.6%; Trinidad and Tobago 16.6%; Cayman Islands 8.22% (2021)

Public finance
- Government debt: $538 million (2010)
- Revenue: $175.3 million (2009 est.)
- Spending: $215.9 million (2009 est.)
- Economic aid: $8.3 million (1995)
- Credit rating: B− (Domestic); B- (Foreign); BBB- (T&C Assessment) (Standard & Poor's)
- All values, unless otherwise stated, are in US dollars.

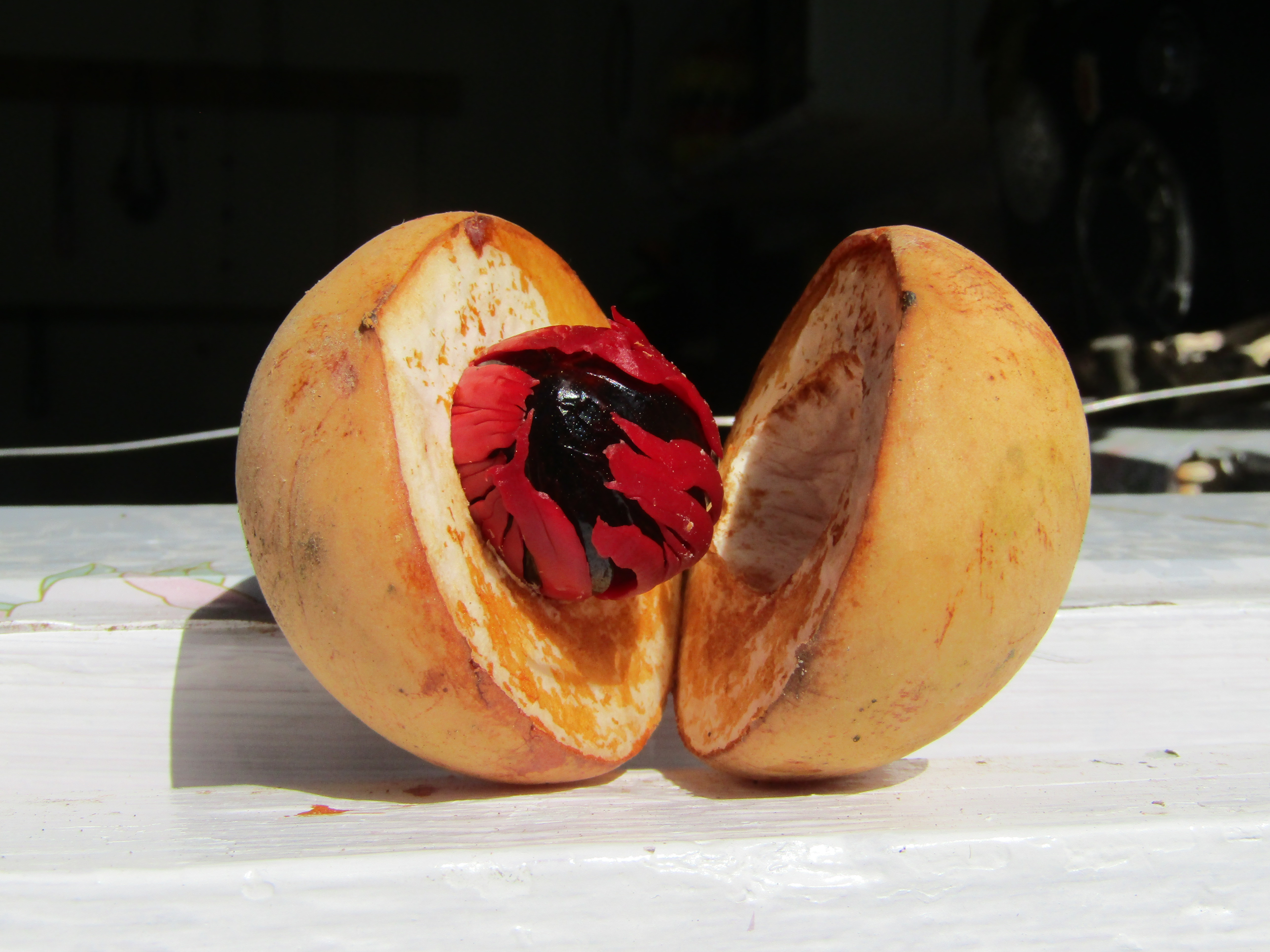
Nutmeg is one of Grenada's key exports

Grenada has a developing economy that is a largely tourism-based, small, and open economy. Between the 1980s and the 2000s, the main thrust of Grenada's economy has shifted from agriculture to services, with tourism serving as the leading foreign currency earning sector. The country's principal export crops are the spices nutmeg and mace (Grenada is the world's second-largest producer of nutmeg after Indonesia). Other crops for export include cocoa, citrus fruits, bananas, cloves, and cinnamon. Manufacturing industries in Grenada operate mostly on a small scale, including production of beverages and other foodstuffs, textiles, and the assembly of electronic components for export.

Economic growth picked up in the late 1990s following slow growth and domestic fiscal adjustment in the early years of the decade. Despite an expansionary fiscal policy, the public debt remained moderate at around 50 percent of GDP as deficits were financed partly by privatization receipts. Since 2001, economic growth has declined. The decline was caused by adverse shocks, such as a slowdown in the global economy and natural disasters. To deal with the shocks, fiscal policy became more expansionary, while privatization receipts declined. As a result, public debt increased sharply to near 110 percent of GDP in 2003. Economic conditions worsened when Hurricane Ivan hit the country in September 2004; progress in fiscal consolidation was impeded as government revenues fell and policy priorities was shifted to post-hurricane relief.

Although reconstruction has proceeded quickly with significant aid from the international community, tourism and agricultural activities remain weak and nearly offset the stimulus from the reconstruction boom. The country is still facing the difficult task of reconstruction and recovery, while public debt is unsustainable and the government faces large financing gaps. In the years ahead, reinvigorating growth will be a high priority, and continued efforts are needed to address vulnerabilities.

== Overview ==
The economy of Grenada is small, and tourism is its largest foreign exchange earner. Grenada shares a common central bank with Organisation of Eastern Caribbean States (OECS) and holds East Caribbean dollars as its currency. After tourism, Grenada relies heavily on agricultural exports, mainly different types of spices. Nutmeg, wheat flour, and various fruits make up the majority of Grenada's exports (per 2017). Grenada has suffered many economic drawbacks since becoming a nation. A major concern is the rising fiscal deficit and heavy debt crippling its government operations. Hurricane Ivan in 2004 led to serious setbacks for Grenada, along with the Great Recession in 2008 as the United States of America is one of Grenada's largest trade partners. Grenada was listed nine spaces above the bottom when it came to total debt in 126 developing countries in 2017.

== Economic Performance ==
After experiencing GDP growth averaging nearly six percent a year in the late 1990s, economic growth declined considerably after 2001 as a result of a decline in the tourism industry following the September 11, 2001, terrorist attacks, and damages caused by several hurricanes.

The economy of Grenada was brought to a near standstill in September 2004 by Hurricane Ivan, which damaged or destroyed 90 percent of the country's buildings, including some tourist facilities. In July 2005, Hurricane Emily struck Grenada who was still recovering from the impact of Hurricane Ivan. Besides the negative impacts to the tourism industry, the two devastating hurricanes destroyed or significantly damaged a large percentage of Grenada's tree crops, which may take years to recover.

As the damage of Hurricane Ivan to the economy exceeded 200 percent of GDP, economic growth registered a negative growth of three percent in 2004, compared with a positive growth rate of 5.8 percent in 2003. Although signs of recovery have been seen in Grenada after the damage inflicted by Hurricanes Ivan and Emily, economic conditions remain difficult; GDP is projected at a growth rate of only one percent for 2005.

With the absence of sustained growth, the fiscal situation started to deteriorate after 2001, reflecting a continued expansionary policy with a sharp increase in spending on social sectors, the wage bill, and goods and services. As a result, the fiscal deficit rose to 8.5 percent of GDP in 2001 from 3.2 percent in 2000. The fiscal situation remained shaky in 2002, with the deficit widening to 19.2 percent of GDP due to dampened output from Tropical Storm Lili. As the economy began to recover in 2003, the government began to take steps for fiscal consolidation, and the fiscal deficit fell to 4.8 percent of GDP. Progress in fiscal consolidation was impeded in 2004 as the government policy changed abruptly to post-hurricane relief. Meanwhile, government revenues decreased as a result of the impact of the hurricanes on the economy.

While economic growth has declined since 2001 due to adverse shocks, including a slowdown in the global economy and natural disasters, fiscal policy became more expansionary when privatization receipts declined. As a result, public debt has increased sharply to over 100 percent of GDP since 2002; it remained as high as near 130 percent of GDP in 2004.

Grenada is a member of the Eastern Caribbean Central Bank (ECCB), which manages monetary policy and issues a common currency for all the member countries. Inflation has remained low and stable within the framework of the currency board arrangement, with inflation averaging at two percent over the past 15 years.

== Balance of Payments ==
Grenada's current account balance has remained in large deficit due to its heavy dependence on import of most consumer goods and domestic investment. Following an average deficit of around 44 percent of GDP from 1997 to 2000, the current account deficit has increased to over 35 percent of GDP since 2001 due to higher import demand combined with lower receipts from tourism and nutmeg exports. The current account deficits are financed by inflows of foreign direct investment, official grants and loans, and commercial borrowing by the private sector. Grenada's economy is vulnerable to external shocks considering its high dependence on tourism, exports, and imports of most of the goods that are consumed or invested domestically. It is also prone to other adverse shocks such as natural disasters.

== Regional Situation ==
In the aftermath of Hurricanes Ivan and Emily, the priority now for Grenada is to continue the recovery process necessary to restore the infrastructure that was devastated by the hurricanes. The international community has disbursed significant amounts of aid, including financial help under the International Monetary Fund's emergency assistance policy for natural disasters and assistance from the World Bank and the Caribbean Development Bank.

In the context of regional economic development, further integration into the Eastern Caribbean regional economy will help enhance Grenada's competitiveness and increase its scale of economy in production, marketing and distribution. The country also launched a citizenship by investment program in 2013.

== International Monetary Fund ==
The nation of Grenada joined the International Monetary Fund (IMF) on August 27, 1975. Since then, Grenada has been under heavy review with the IMF, who have made Grenada eligible for special drawing rights. Special drawing rights (abbreviated SDR) are supplementary foreign exchange reserve assets defined and maintained by the IMF. Based on Grenada's performances, both economically and policy wise, Grenada can be eligible for more SDRs. In the previous years, Grenada and the IMF have been working closely to grow and sustain their economy.

== Sectors ==
=== Transport ===
Transport in Grenada consists of a network of highways connecting major population centres, airports and ports and harbours along the coast. Grenada has no merchant marine.

There is one industrial railway, used by a rum distillery.

Highways:
total: 1,127 km
paved: 687 km
Drivers in Grenada drive on the left hand side of the road. Visitors not accustomed to this should be extra cautious when driving on the island's highways and roads.
unpaved: 440 km (1999 est.)
Grenada's roads can pose hazardous driving conditions, including aggressive drivers and sharp curves.

Grenada has several ports of entry including seaports, bays and harbours:

- St. George's
- St. David's Bay
- Grenville
- Hillsborough on Carriacou

Airports: 3 (1999 est.)

List of airports in Grenada

Airports - with paved runways:
total: 3
2,438 to 3,047 m: 1
914 to 1,523 m: 1
under 914 m: 1 (2006 est.)

=== Telecommunications ===
Present-day communications in Grenada include telephone, radio, television, and internet usage.

=== Education ===
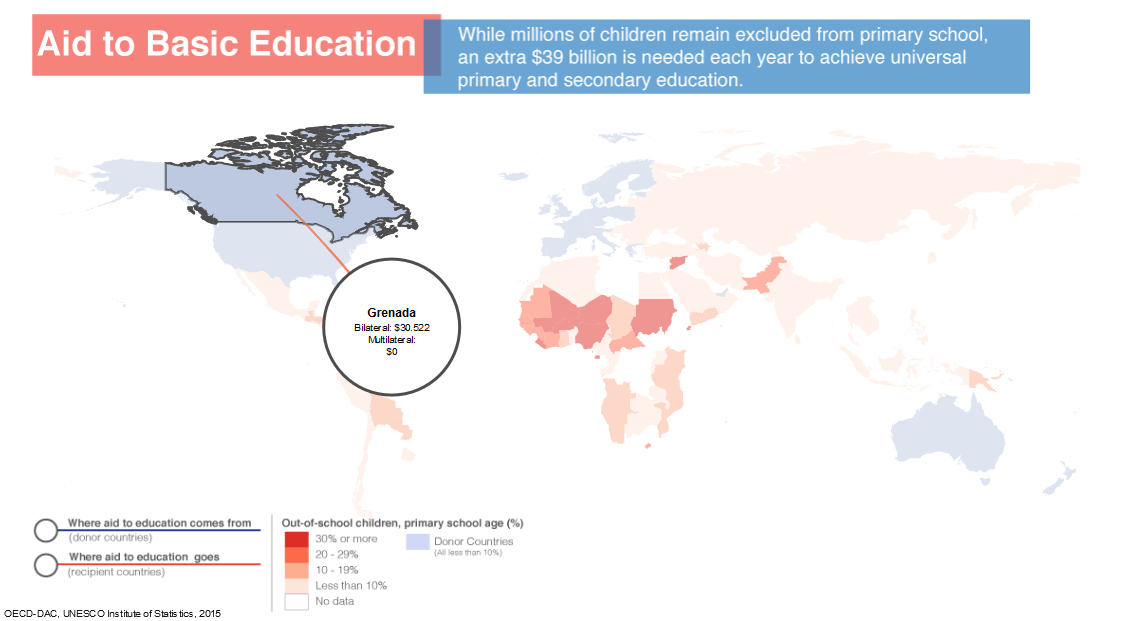
Aid to basic education map

Education in Grenada is free and compulsory between the ages of 6 and 14 years. In 1998, the gross primary enrollment rate was 125.5 percent, while the net primary enrollment rate was 97.5 percent. Despite the high enrollment rate, poverty, poor school facilities, and the periodic need to help with family farm harvests have resulted in approximately a 7 percent absenteeism rate among primary school children.

The Human Rights Measurement Initiative (HRMI) finds that Grenada is fulfilling only 88.7% of what it should be fulfilling for the right to education based on the country's level of income. HRMI breaks down the right to education by looking at the rights to both primary education and secondary education. While taking into consideration Grenada's income level, the nation is achieving 88.5% of what should be possible based on its resources (income) for primary education and 88.9% for secondary education.

=== Healthcare ===
Grenada had one of the best health care systems in the Caribbean in 2000 according to a report by the World Health Organization. In 2014, life expectancy at birth was 74.1 years. In 1983 the infant mortality rate of 21.2 per 1,000 live births, rather better than other Eastern Caribbean islands.

== Statistics ==
Exports of Grenada by product category (2019) Chemical products Transportation Machines Mineral products Plastics and rubbers Metals Foodstuffs Precious metals Textiles Instruments Animal products Vegetable products Paper goods Footwear and headwear Miscellaneous Stone and glass Wood products Animal and vegetable bi-products Animal hides Arts and antiques Weapons

Grenada electricity production 1980-2019

- GDP: purchasing power parity - $1.401 billion (2015 est.)
- GDP - real growth rate: 4.6% (2015 est.)
- GDP - per capita: purchasing power parity - $13,100 (2015 est.)
- GDP - composition by sector:
  - Agriculture: 6.2%
  - Industry: 14.3%
  - Services: 79.5% (2015 est.)
- Population below poverty line: 38% (2008 est.)
- Household income or consumption by percentage share:
  - lowest 10%: NA%
  - highest 10%: NA%
- Inflation rate (consumer prices): 1.3% (2015)
- Labor force: 59,900 (2013)
- Labor force - by occupation:
  - Services 69%
  - Agriculture 11%
  - Industry 20% (2008 est.)
- Unemployment rate: 33.5% (2013)
- Budget:
  - Revenues: $191.8 million
  - Expenditures: $230.9 million (2012 est)
- Industries: food and beverages, textiles, light assembly operations, tourism, construction
- Industrial production growth rate: -1% (2015 est.)
- Electricity - production: 193 GWh (2012 est.)
- Electricity - production by source:
  - Fossil fuel: 98.2%
  - Hydro: 0%
  - Nuclear: 0%
  - Other: 1.4% (2012 est.)
- Electricity - consumption: 178 GWh (2012 est.)
- Electricity - exports: 0 kWh (2013 est.)
- Electricity - imports: 0 kWh (2013 est.)
- Agriculture - products: bananas, cocoa, nutmeg, mace, citrus, avocados, root crops, sugarcane, maize, vegetables
- Exports: $43.8 million (2015 est.)
- Exports - commodities: nutmeg, bananas, cocoa, fruit and vegetables, clothing, mace
- Exports - partners: Nigeria 44.7%, St. Lucia 10.8%, Antigua and Barbuda 7.3%, St. Kitts and Nevis 6.6%, Dominica 6.6%, United States 5.8% (2015)
- Imports: $310.4 million (2015 est.)
- Imports - commodities: food, manufactured goods, machinery, chemicals, fuel
- Imports - partners: Trinidad and Tobago 49.6%, United States 16.4% (2015)
- Debt - external: $679 million (2013 est.)
- Economic aid - recipient: $8.3 million (1995)
- Currency: 1 East Caribbean dollar (EC$) = 100 cents
- Exchange rates: East Caribbean dollars (EC$) per US$1 – 2.7000 (fixed rate since 1976)
- Fiscal year: calendar year
