= Belmont, Grenada =

Belmont
- Town
- Location within Grenada
- Coordinates: 12°9′59″N 61°38′1″W
- Country: Grenada
- Parish: Saint George
- Elevation: 331 ft (101 m)
- Time zone: UTC-4

Belmont is a town in Saint Patrick parish in Grenada.

== History ==
Belmont Estate was established in the late 17th century during French colonial rule, when plantations were being set up across Grenada. It was originally one of many estates created under the plantation system, focused on coffee and sugarcane production. Through the 18th and 19th centuries, Belmont's agriculture evolved from coffee and sugar to include cotton, and later cocoa, nutmeg and bananas.

After France ceded Grenada to Britain in 1763, Belmont Estate changed ownership. Early owners included French families such as the Bernege family, and by the mid-1700s, John Aitcheson Jr., a Scottish plantation owner, acquired the property. After Aitcheson’s death in 1780, the estate was sold to Robert Alexander Houston; the Houston family retained Belmont for over 170 years, spanning much of the 19th and early 20th centuries.

In 1944, Norbert and Lyris Nyack purchased Belmont Estate. They became the first Grenadians of Indian heritage to own a major plantation, marking a shift from European colonial ownership to local ownership. Under the leadership of Shadel Nyack Compton, Belmont Estate pivoted from a traditional plantation to an agritourism destination in 2002. This included opening the estate to visitors, establishing a heritage museum, restaurant and farm tours highlighting Grenada’s agricultural traditions.
