= Elie Hall =

- Village
- Location within Grenada
- Coordinates: 12°12′N 61°38′W
- Country: Grenada
- Parish: Saint Patrick
- Elevation: 253 ft (77 m)
- Time zone: UTC-4

Elie Hall is a town in Saint Patrick Parish, Grenada. It is located near the northern end of the island.

== See also ==
- List of cities in Grenada
