= Ajamu =

Grenadian calypsonian

- Born: July 27, 1963 (age 63); Mamma Cannes, British Grenada
- Occupation: Musician
- Years active: 1980—present

Edson Mitchell, also known as Ajamu or King Ajamu, is a Grenadian calypsonian. His music covers several Caribbean styles, including calypso, soca and reggae. He has held the title of Grenada Calypso Monarch a record nine times in 1987, 1988, 1990, 1991, 1992, 1995, 2004, 2014 and again in 2015, meaning that he holds the most crowns in comparison to anyone else in Grenada Calypso. In 1998, he was appointed as a Member of The Order of the British Empire.Ajamu now has a band based in Brooklyn. In 2005 he and his band visited Grenada and held a live concert. He then went to Carriacou and demonstrated his prowess in music for the enjoyment of all present. Edson Mitchell AKA Ajamu is from Mama Cannes in St. Andrew. He started his music career singing in church and later by singing reggae with his friends. He is considered to be one of the better and more significant musicians by the people of Grenada.
