= Maulti =

- Village
- Location within Grenada
- Coordinates: 12°02′N 61°40′W
- Country: Grenada
- Parish: Saint David
- Elevation: 26 ft (8 m)
- Time zone: UTC-4

Maulti is a town in Saint David Parish, Grenada. It is located along the island's southern coast.
