= Morne Fendue =

- Village
- Location within Grenada
- Coordinates: 12°12′N 61°38′W
- Country: Grenada
- Parish: Saint Patrick
- Elevation: 253 ft (77 m)
- Time zone: UTC-4

Morne Fendue is a village in Saint Patrick Parish, Grenada. It is located at the northern end of the island.
