= Morne Tranquille =

- Village
- Location within Grenada
- Coordinates: 12°03′N 61°42′W
- Country: Grenada
- Parish: Saint David
- Elevation: 463 ft (141 m)
- Time zone: UTC-4

Morne Tranquille is a town in Saint David Parish, Grenada. It is located somewhat inland from the southern end of the island.
