= Becke Moui =

- Village
- Location within Grenada
- Coordinates: 12°01′06″N 61°41′50″W
- Country: Grenada
- Parish: Saint David
- Elevation: 3.3 ft (1 m)
- Time zone: UTC-4

Becke Moui is a town in Saint David Parish, Grenada. It is located at the southern end of the island, along the southern coast.
