= Calivigny =

- Village
- Location within Grenada
- Coordinates: 12°01′N 61°44′W
- Country: Grenada
- Parish: Saint George
- Elevation: 210 ft (64 m)
- Time zone: UTC-4

Calivigny is a village in Grenada. It is located on the island's south coast, to the southeast of the capital, St. George's, in the Parish of Saint George.
