= Mount Craven =

- Village
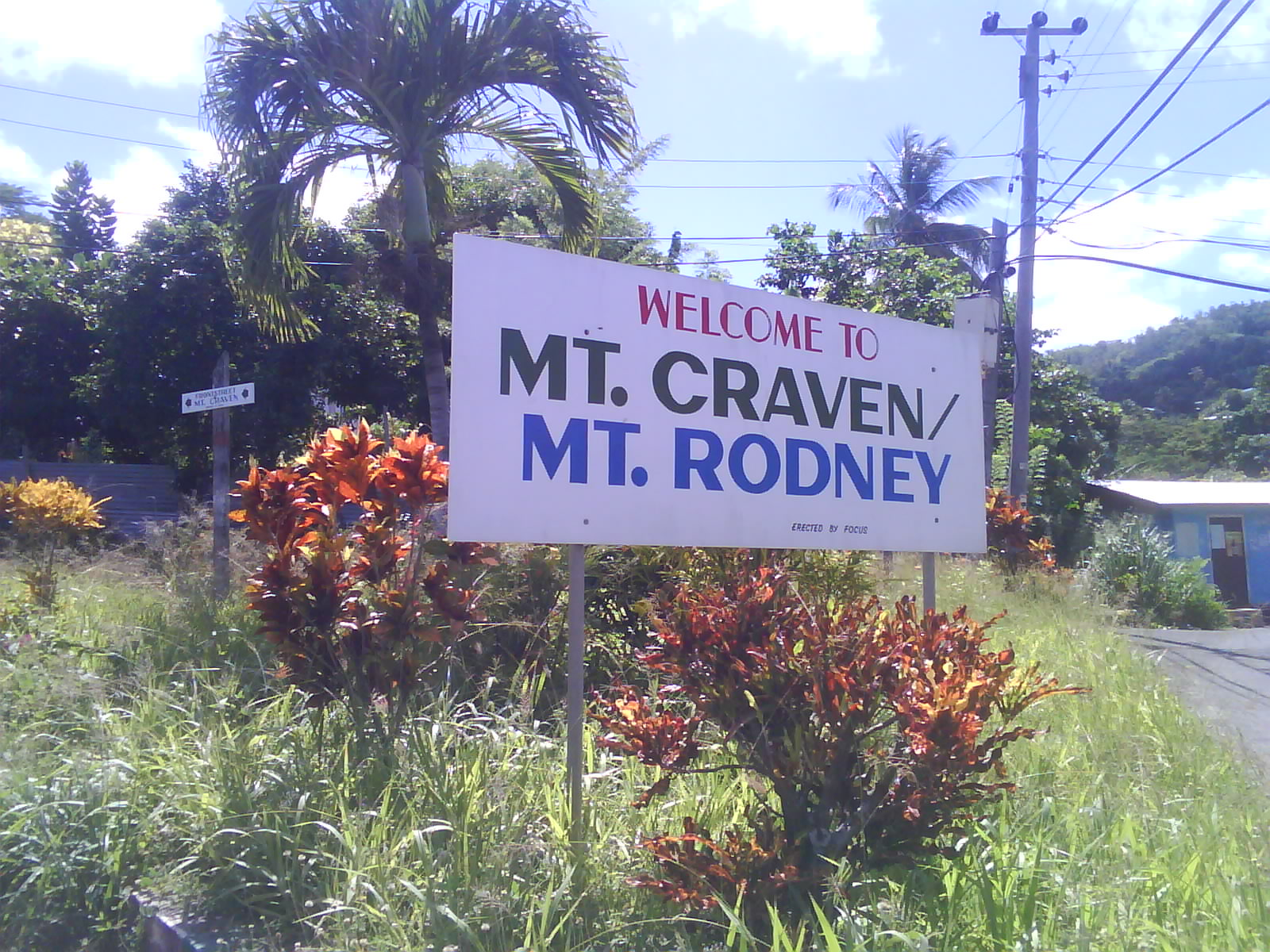
- Welcome Sign

- Location within Grenada
- Coordinates: 12°13′N 61°39′W
- Country: Grenada
- Parish: Saint Patrick
- Elevation: 289 ft (88 m)
- Time zone: UTC-4

Mount Craven is a village in Grenada. It is located on the island's north coast, in the Parish of Saint Patrick, near the parish capital, Sauteurs.
