= Upper La Taste =

- Village
- Location within Grenada
- Coordinates: 12°11′N 61°37′W
- Country: Grenada
- Parish: Saint Patrick
- Elevation: 207 ft (63 m)
- Time zone: UTC-4

Upper La Taste is a town in Saint Patrick Parish, Grenada. It is located towards the northern end of the island, along the eastern coast.
