= Upper La Tante =

- Village
- Location within Grenada
- Coordinates: 12°03′N 61°39′W
- Country: Grenada
- Parish: Saint David
- Elevation: 108 ft (33 m)
- Time zone: UTC-4

Upper La Tante is a town in Saint David Parish, Grenada. It is located towards the southern end of the island.
