= Hog Island (Grenada) =

Island of Grenada

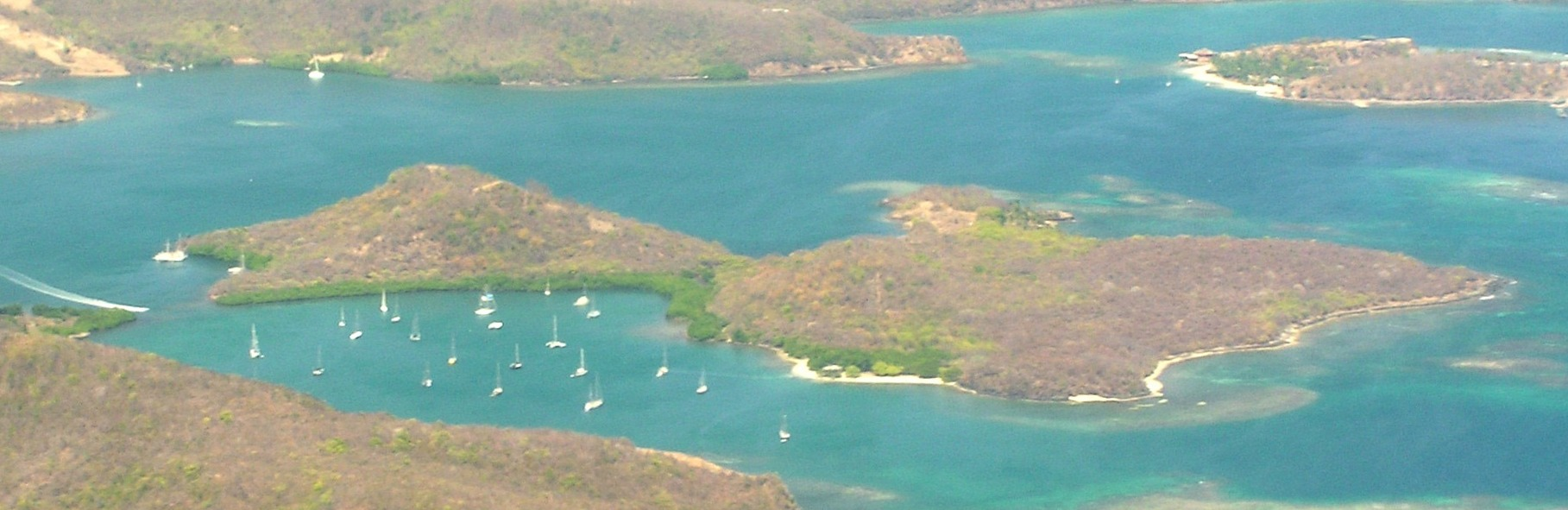
- Hog Island (2004)

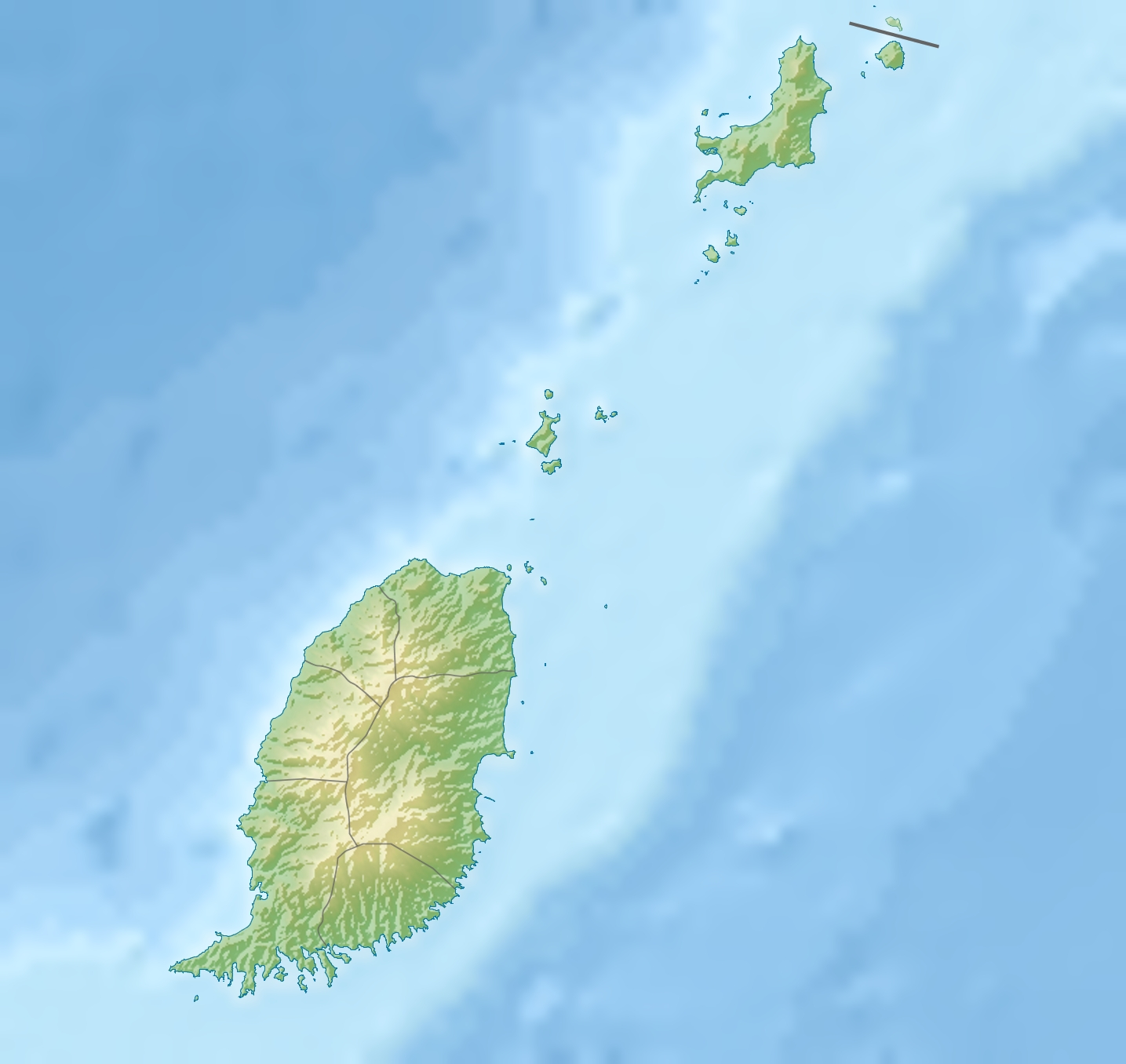
- Location within Grenada Location within Lesser Antilles Location within the Caribbean

Geography
- Location: Caribbean
- Coordinates: 12.000°N 61.738°W
- Archipelago: Grenadines
- Area: 0.1413 sq mi (0.366 km^{2})
- Coastline: 1.98 mi (3.19 km)

Administration
- Grenada
- Dependency: St. George
- Prime Minister of Grenada: Dickon Mitchell

Demographics
- Population: 0

Hog Island is a small uninhabited island off the southern coast of the island of Grenada in the Caribbean. Hog Island covers 85 acres and lies 0.438 miles (0.705 km) west of Calvigny Island.

== History ==
The island was named after wild pigs that lived in the past there. Hog Island was owned by the Theodore family for four generations who farmed there. In 1979, the government declared the acquisition of Hog Island for public purposes but never took possession or compensated the Theodore family, who have continued to use the land. In 2006 a major resort with a hotel and villas was proposed by Cinnamon 88 to be built on the island and Mt. Hartman Estate. It was met with resistance due to the impact on the critically endangered, endemic Grenada Dove. In January 2007, photos emerged showing that Cinnamon 88 had clear-cut a large area in the southern part of Hog Island. Planning stopped in 2008 when the global financial crisis occurred. Between June 2007 and July 2009 a bridge was built connecting the island to the mainland.

== Tourism ==
The island can be reached by water taxi or by foot or bike over the bridge. On the western coast there are two bars. Due to the reefs close to the shore, Hog Island offers accessible snorkeling with marine life visible close to land.
