= Marquis, Grenada =

Marquis
- Town
- Location within Grenada
- Coordinates: 12°05′N 61°37′W
- Country: Grenada
- Parish: St. Andrew
- Elevation: 0 ft (0 m)
- Time zone: UTC-4

Marquis is a town in the French territory of Marquis on the island Grenada. It is located on the island's east coast, to the south of Grenville, Grenada on the Eastern Main Road on the way to Pomme Rose and St. David's.

== History ==
In 1795–1796 the hill of Battle Hill and Marquis was owned by the French. Marquis was the first capital city of the parish of Saint Andrew from 1795 to 1796. The Marquis Pentecostal Church is the Oldest Pentecostal Assemblies of the West Indies (PAWI) church in Grenada and it was Established in May 1927.
