= Bois de Gannes =

- Village
- Location within Grenada
- Coordinates: 12°02′N 61°42′W
- Country: Grenada
- Parish: Saint David
- Elevation: 341 ft (104 m)
- Time zone: UTC-4

Bois de Gannes is a town in Saint David Parish, Grenada. It is located towards the southern end of the island.
