= Morne Rouge, Grenada =

Morne Rouge
- Village
- Location within Grenada
- Coordinates: 12°01′N 61°46′W
- Country: Grenada
- Parish: Saint George
- Elevation: 33 ft (10 m)
- Time zone: UTC-4

Morne Rouge is a town in Saint George Parish, Grenada. It is located at the southern end of the island, near its very tip.
