= L'Anse Aux Epines =

Lance Aux Epines
- Residential community
- Location within Grenada
- Coordinates: 11°59′40″N 61°45′22″W
- Country: Grenada
- Parish: Saint George
- Time zone: UTC-4

Lance Aux Epines is a primarily residential community in Saint George Parish, Grenada. As the most southerly tip of Grenada, it forms part of the line separating the Caribbean sea from the Atlantic Ocean.

The name translates to "The Beach/Bay of Thorns."
