= Union, Grenada =

Union
- Village
- Location within Grenada
- Coordinates: 12°12′00″N 61°40′00″W
- Country: Grenada
- Parish: Saint Patrick
- Elevation: 866 ft (264 m)
- Time zone: UTC-4

Union is a town in Saint Patrick Parish, Grenada. It is located towards the northern end of the island.
