= Union Village =

Union Village could refer to:

- Union Village, Grenada
- Union Village, Rhode Island
- Union Village, Vermont
- Union Village Shaker settlement
- the former name for Greenwich (village), New York
