= Diego Piece =

- Village
- Location within Grenada
- Coordinates: 12°12′N 61°40′W
- Country: Grenada
- Parish: Saint Patrick
- Elevation: 866 ft (264 m)
- Time zone: UTC-4

Diego Piece is a settlement in Grenada. It is located at the northern end of the island, in the Parish of Saint Patrick.
