= Deblando =

- Village
- Location within Grenada
- Coordinates: 12°06′N 61°38′W
- Country: Grenada
- Parish: Saint Andrew
- Elevation: 151 ft (46 m)
- Time zone: UTC-4

Deblando is a town in Saint Andrew Parish, Grenada. It is located along the island's eastern coast.
