= Morne Longue =

- Village
- Location within Grenada
- Coordinates: 12°07′N 61°41′W
- Country: Grenada
- Parish: Saint Andrew
- Time zone: UTC-4

Morne Longue is a town in Saint Andrew Parish, Grenada. It is located at the center of the island.
