= Amber Belair =

- Community
- Location within Grenada
- Coordinates: 12°00′14″N 61°45′43″W
- Country: Grenada
- Parish: Saint George
- Time zone: UTC-4

Amber Belair is a community in Saint George Parish, Grenada. It is located at the southern end of the island.
