= Willis, Grenada =

Willis
- Village
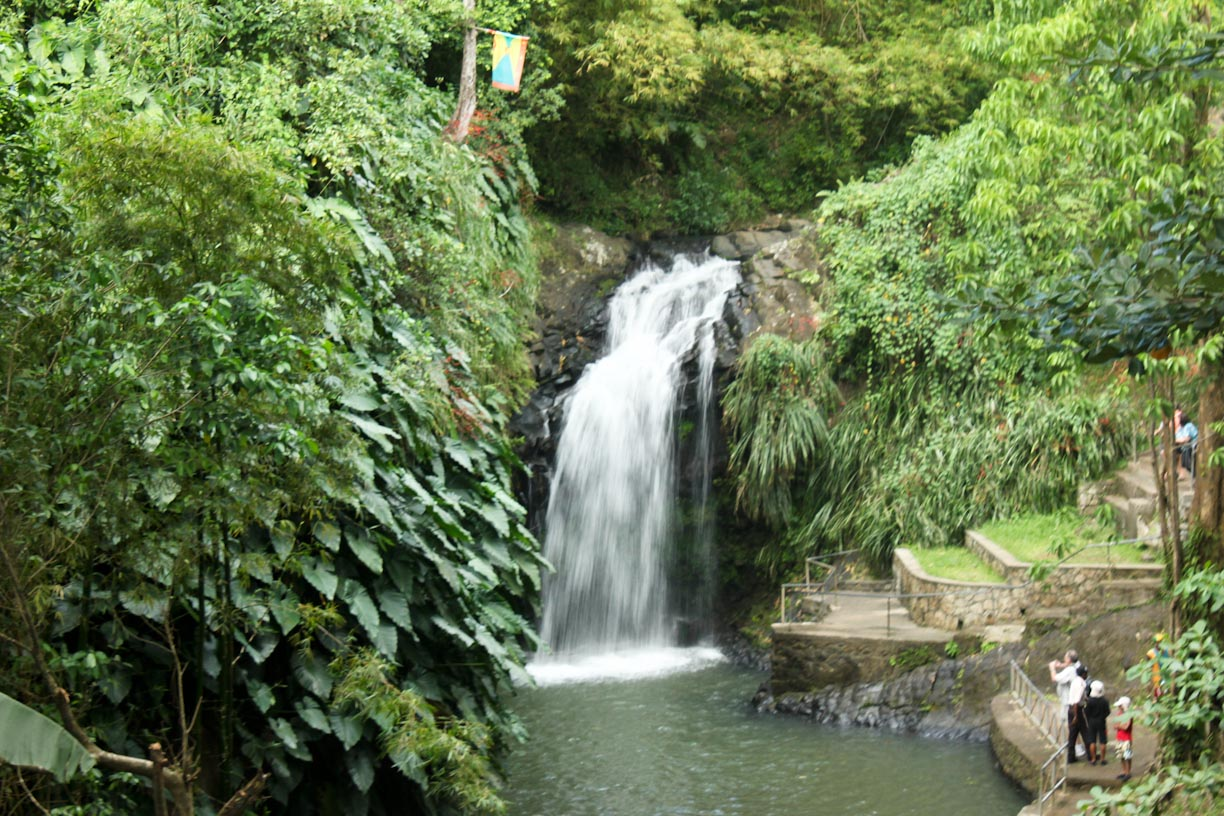
- Annandale Waterfalls

- Location within Grenada
- Coordinates: 12°05′N 61°43′W
- Country: Grenada
- Parish: Saint George
- Elevation: 1,053 ft (321 m)

Population
  - Total: 500
- Time zone: UTC-4

Willis is a town in Grenada; it is located in the Parish of Saint George, some miles inland from Saint George's, towards the center of the island. It is the community where the famous Annandale Waterfalls is eloquently situated. With lush evergreen trees, unusually- never before seen exotic plants and an array of spices and fruit trees live here.

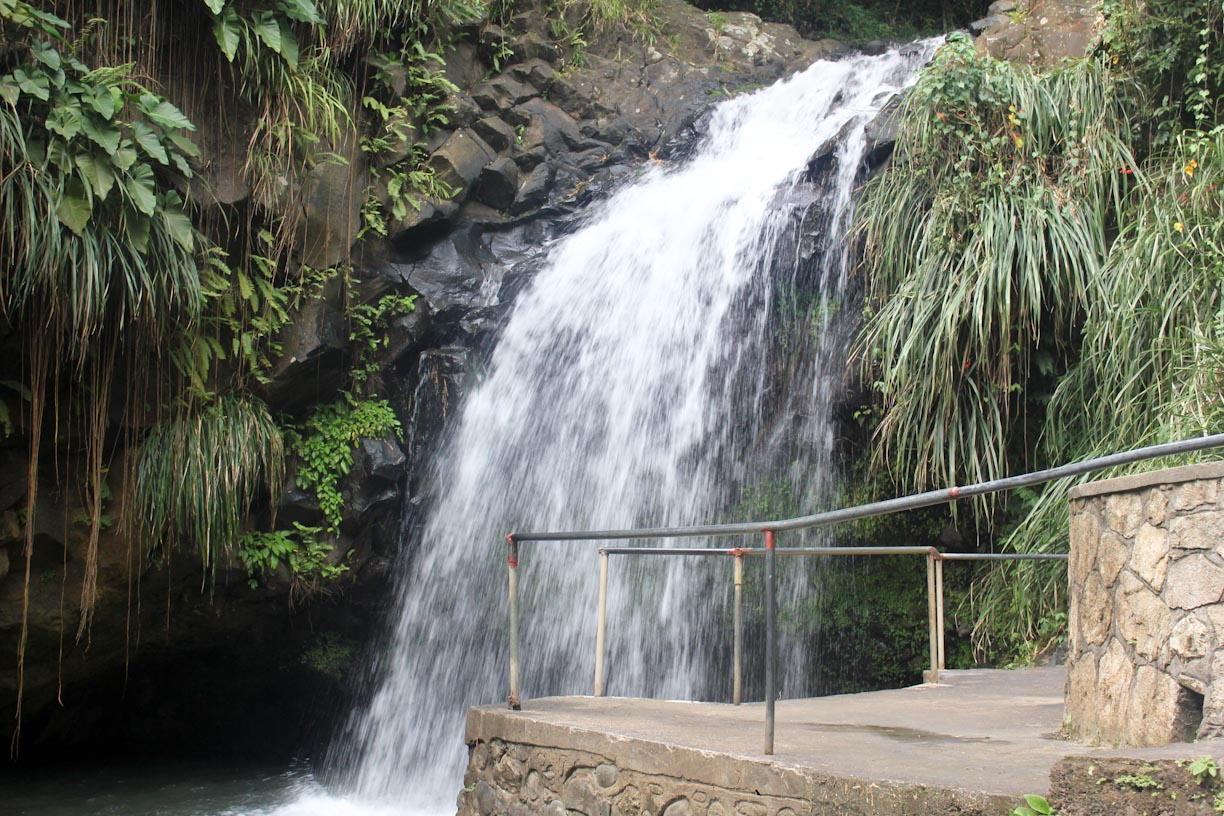
Annandale Waterfalls
