= Diamond Island (Grenadines) =

Island in Grenada

Coordinates: 12°20′N 61°35′W

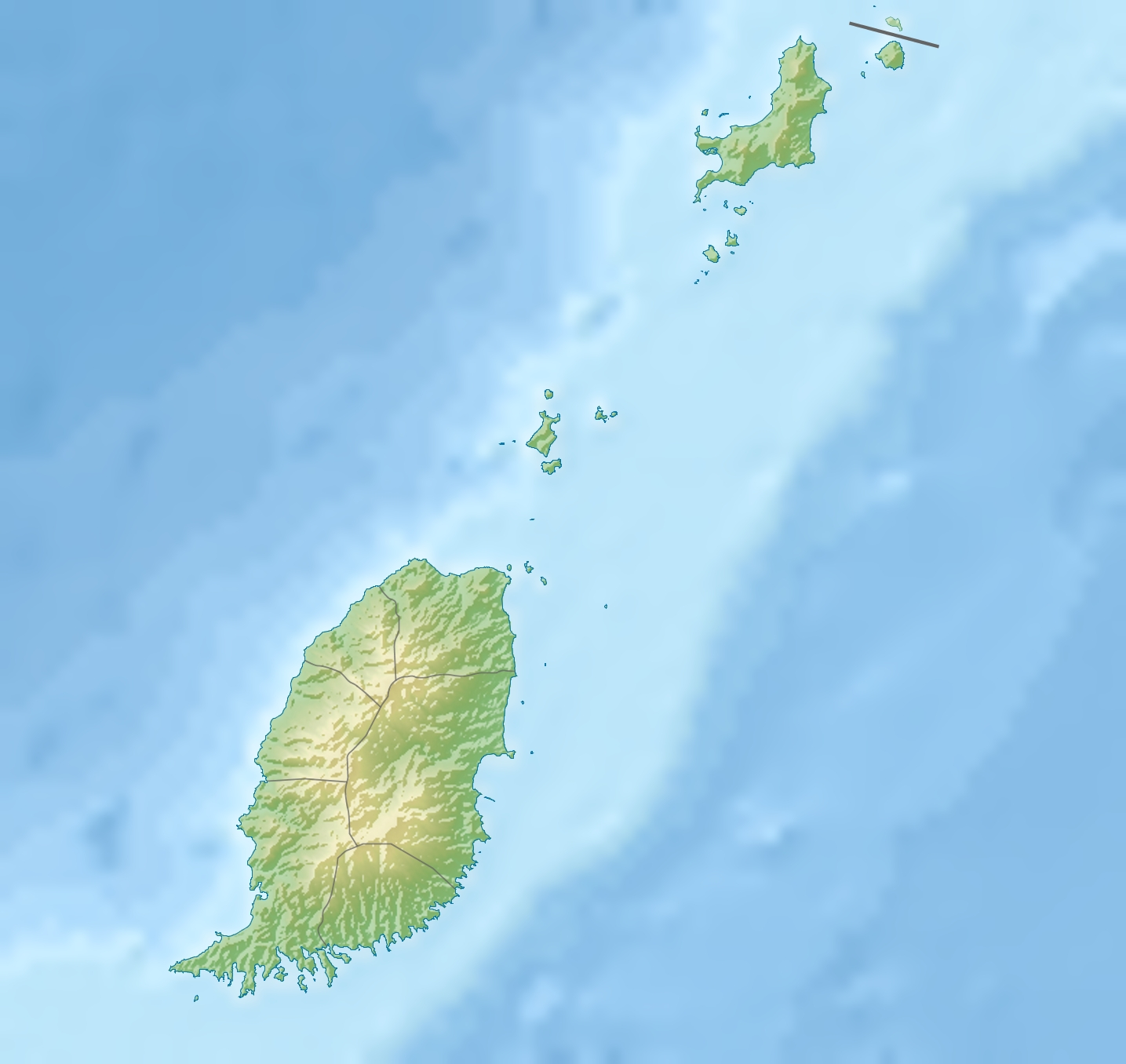
- Location within Grenada Location within Lesser Antilles Location within the Caribbean

Geography
- Location: Caribbean
- Archipelago: Grenadines

Administration
- Grenada
- Dependency: Saint Patrick Parish

Diamond Island is a small islet belonging to Grenada in the Grenadines archipelago of the Lesser Antilles, part of the Caribbean. The island is located between the larger islands of Grenada to the southwest and Carriacou to the northeast, and is found immediately north of Ronde Island. Its area is 22 ha ( 54.37 acres )

The island is also referred to as Diamond Rock and was historically known as Kick 'em Jenny a name that later transferred to a nearby underwater volcano.

== See also ==
- List of Caribbean islands
