= Tivoli, Grenada =

Tivoli
- Village
- Location within Grenada
- Coordinates: 12°10′N 61°37′W
- Country: Grenada
- Parish: Saint Andrew
- Elevation: 23 ft (7 m)
- Time zone: UTC-4

Tivoli is a small village in the parish of St. Andrew, Grenada located in the northeast of the island.
