= Clabony =

Town in Grenada

- Village
- Location within Grenada
- Coordinates: 12°08′N 61°40′W
- Country: Grenada
- Parish: Saint Andrew
- Elevation: 381 ft (116 m)
- Time zone: UTC-4

Clabony is a town in Saint Andrew Parish, Grenada. It is located at the center of the island.
