= Ka-fe Beau =

- Village
- Location within Grenada
- Coordinates: 12°02′N 61°45′W
- Country: Grenada
- Parish: Saint George
- Elevation: 187 ft (57 m)
- Time zone: UTC-4

Ka-fe Beau is a town in Saint George Parish, Grenada. It is located at the southern end of the island, on the western coast.
