= Upper Capitol =

- Village
- Location within Grenada
- Coordinates: 12°07′N 61°40′W
- Country: Grenada
- Parish: Saint Andrew
- Elevation: 955 ft (291 m)
- Time zone: UTC-4

Upper Capitol is a town in Saint Andrew Parish, Grenada. It is located towards the northern end of the island. It is adjacent to St. James, and a part of the bigger Birch Grove community
