= Transport in Grenada =

Transport in Grenada consists of a network of highways connecting major population centres, airports and ports and harbours along the coast. Grenada has no merchant marine.

There is one industrial railway, used by a rum distillery.

Highways:
total: 1,127 km
paved: 687 km
Drivers in Grenada drive on the left hand side of the road. Visitors not accustomed to this should be extra cautious when driving on the island's highways and roads.
unpaved: 440 km (1999 est.)
Grenada's roads can pose hazardous driving conditions, including aggressive drivers and sharp curves.

Grenada has several ports of entry including seaports, bays and harbours:

- St. George's
- St. David's Bay
- Grenville
- Hillsborough on Carriacou

Airports: 3 (1999 est.)

List of airports in Grenada

Airports - with paved runways:
total: 3
2,438 to 3,047 m: 1
914 to 1,523 m: 1
under 914 m: 1 (2006 est.)
