= Bogles =

- Town
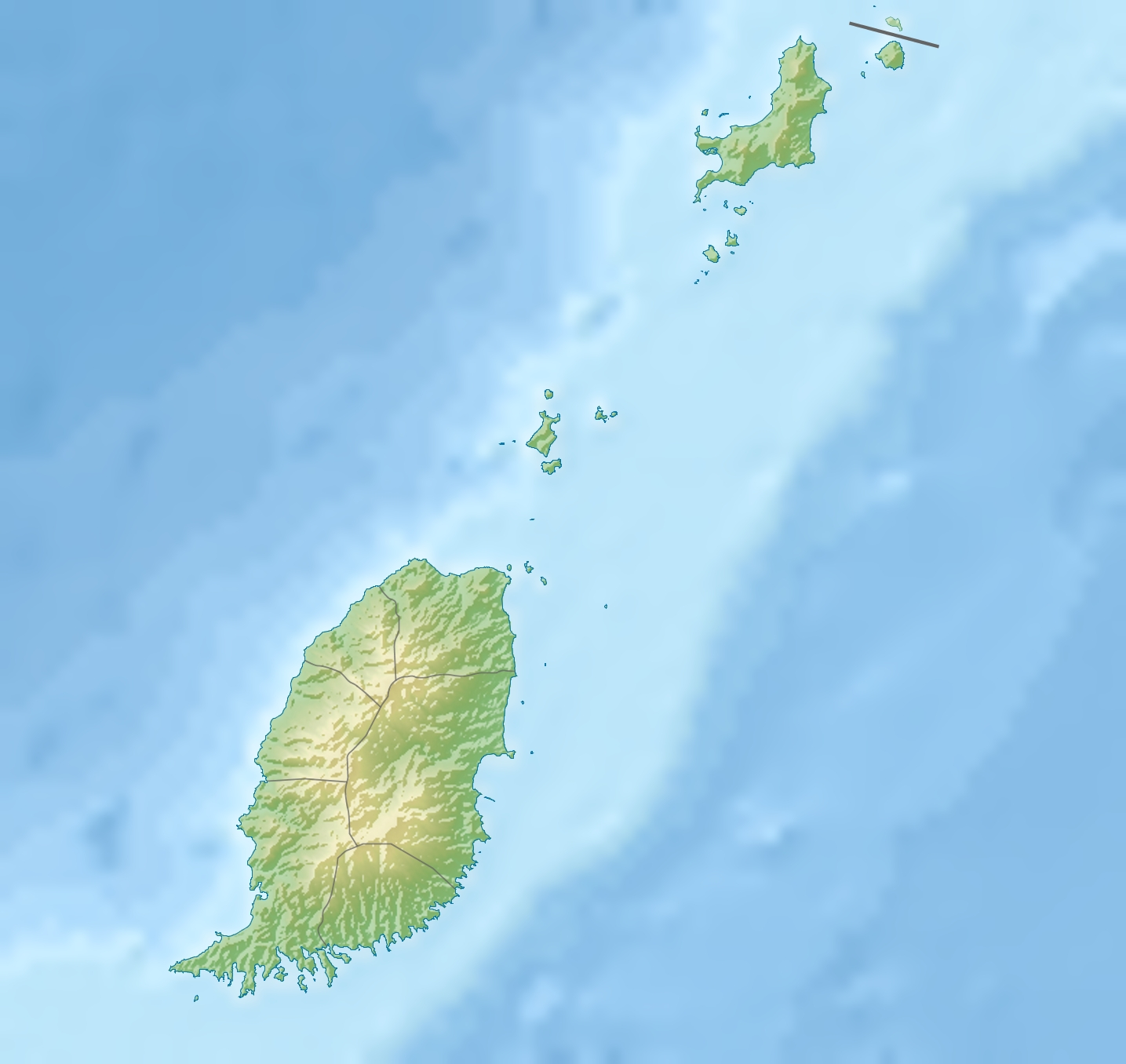
- Location in Grenada
- Coordinates: 12°30′02″N 61°26′01″W
- Country: Grenada
- Dependency: Carriacou and Petite Martinique
- Elevation: 118 ft (36 m)
- Time zone: UTC-04:00 (AST)

Bogles is a town on the island of Carriacou in Grenada.
