= Chutz =

- Village
- Location within Grenada
- Coordinates: 12°06′N 61°39′W
- Country: Grenada
- Parish: Saint Andrew
- Elevation: 610 ft (186 m)
- Time zone: UTC-4

Chutz is a town in Saint Andrew Parish, Grenada. It is located towards the center of the island, on its eastern side.
