= Upper Conference =

- Village
- Location within Grenada
- Coordinates: 12°09′N 61°37′W
- Country: Grenada
- Parish: Saint Andrew
- Elevation: 6.6 ft (2 m)
- Time zone: UTC-4

Upper Conference is a town in Saint Andrew Parish, Grenada. It is located towards the northern end of the island, along the eastern coast.
