= Madame Pierre town =

Main town in Petite Martinique

Madame Pierre
- Town
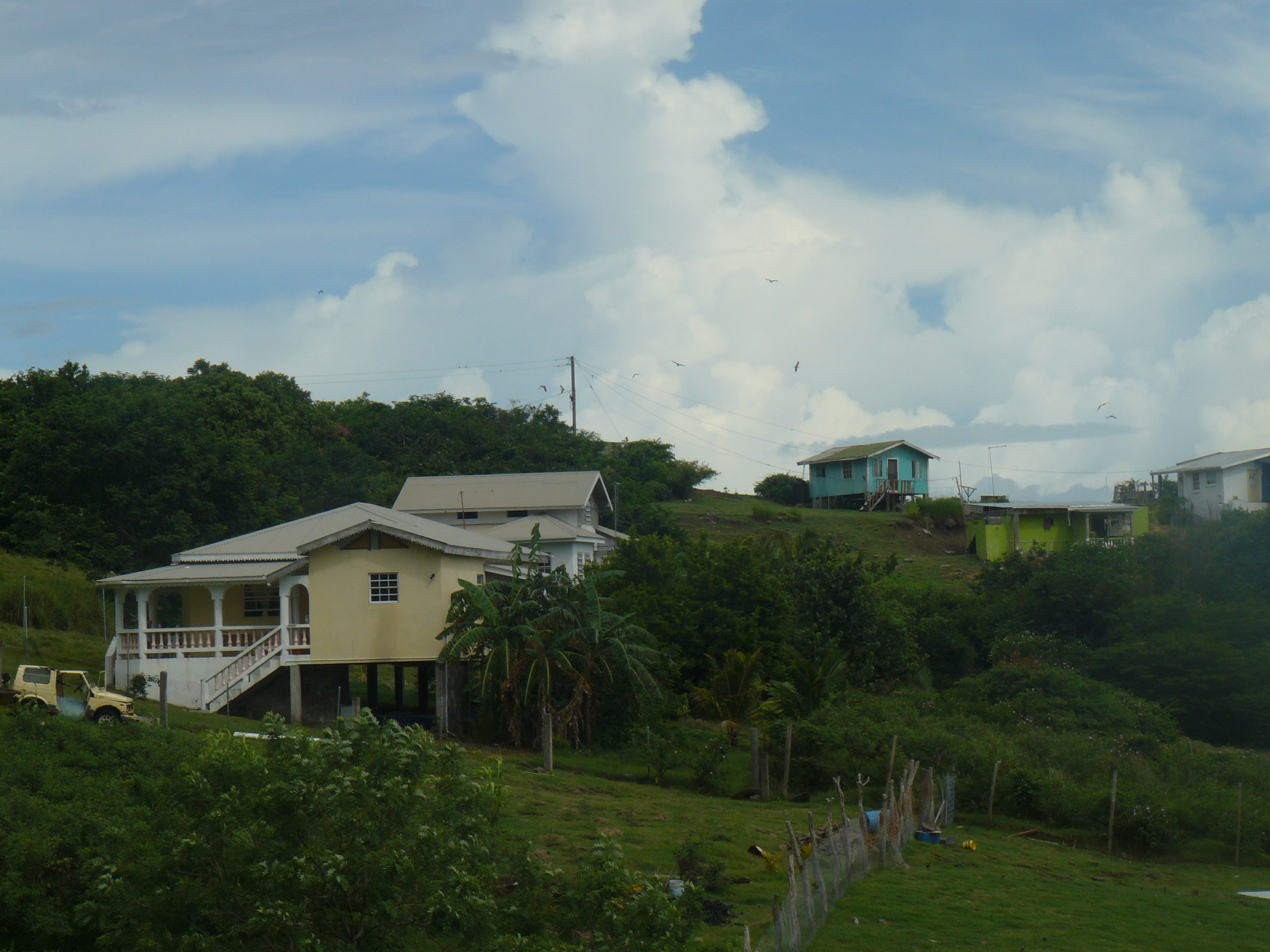
- Founder: Pierre Philip
- Named for: Madame Pierre

Area
  - Total: 237 ha (586 acres)
- Elevation: 1 m (3.3 ft)

Madame Pierre town is the capital of the island of Petite Martinique (Petite Martinik). Petite Martinique is a part of Grenada.

== History ==
The town was named after Madame Pierre, the wife of Mr Pierre, who was the 'first settler' in Petite Martinique. This Madame Pierre has been identified as the Mulatto wife of a land owner called Pierre Philip who was the brother of Honoré Philip (father of Joachim Philip) The town has a population of around 900 people. The people of Petite Martinique are descendants from the various French and English families and the slaves that were brought to the island.

== Culture ==
Inhabitants of Petite Martinque speak English and Grenadian Creole French. Most residents sustain themselves by fishing and boat making.
