= Upper Pearls =

- Village
- Location within Grenada
- Coordinates: 12°09′N 61°37′W
- Country: Grenada
- Parish: Saint Andrew
- Elevation: 6.6 ft (2 m)
- Time zone: UTC-4

Upper Pearls is a town in Saint Andrew Parish, Grenada. It is located towards the northern end of the island, along the east coast.
