= Calivigny Island =

Islet in the Caribbean

Coordinates: 12°17′10″N 61°34′55″W

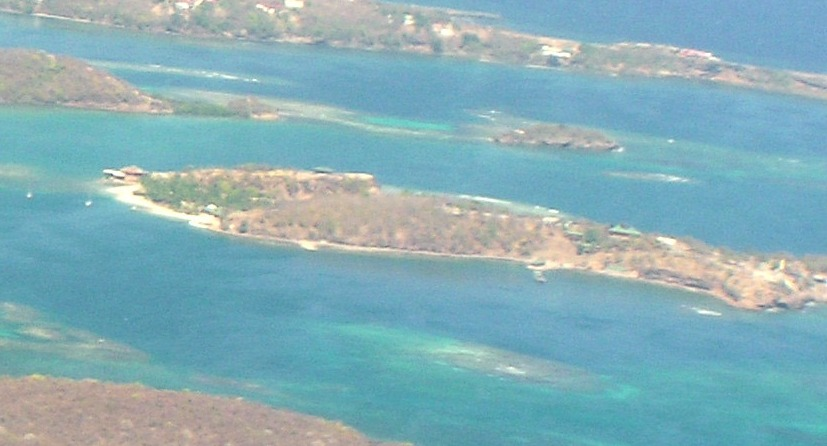
Northern half of Calvigny Island (2004)

Calivigny Island is a small island off the southern coast of the island of Grenada in the Caribbean. Calivigny Island covers 80 acres, with its small pond, is located between the Atlantic and Caribbean oceans by the island of Grenada off Petit Calivigny Point, and can be very clearly seen just 0.140 miles (0.226 km) from Grenada's southern coastal road in Lower Woburn, or from Le Phare Bleu. It is also 0.438 miles (0.705 km) east of Hog Island. It is one of the most expensive resorts in the world.

== History ==
The parent island of Grenada abounds in archaeological sites. In 1964 Ripley P. and Adelaide K. Bullen produced an archaeological summary of Grenada which listed fourteen sites, of which the most important are Calivigny Island, Saanne Suazey, Pearls, and Westerhall Point. These terrestrial vertebrates were identified as Iguana sp., Chelonia mydas, Didelphis marsupialis, Dasyprocta sp., Canis familiaris, and Homo sapiens.

Also discovered were many Arawakan Ceramic Age (500—400 B.C.) artifacts in recent years; most of them in archaeological sites including those on Calivigny Island. One such finding there was decorated with a number of circular designs in black on the red clay background. The original site has since been destroyed by hurricanes and subsequent resort buildings.

The site served as a plantation in the colonial era, having a total of 338 slaves at its height in the year 1820.

Between the 1960s and 1970s there was an old inn on the island called Calivigny Island Inn in a partly restored 10-room house, it was just a half-mile from the main island of Grenada and was considered a pleasant place to spend an afternoon by the white sands. Local fishermen and snorkelers were often the chief visitors.

== Yachting and resort development ==
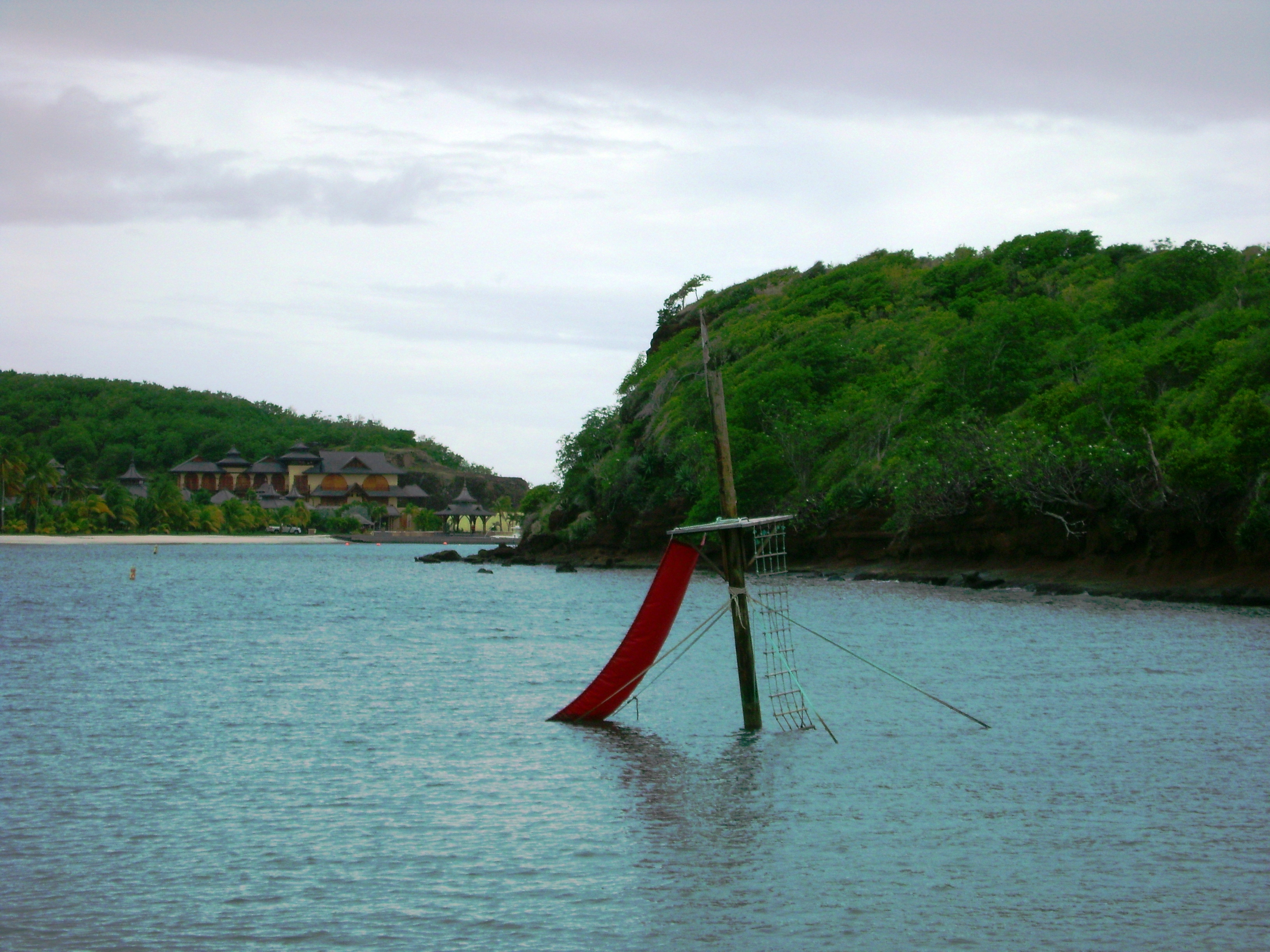
A resort in 2009 on Calivingy Island (left)

Grenada, like many of its neighboring islands, has a long history of boating and yachting. During the 1980s, yachts had to avoid the area of Grenada's southeast coast between the west side of Hog Island and Chemin Bay to the east, as there was a military base and practice shooting range operated by the army on Calivigny Island and sea vessels could pass within five miles outside this islet only with prior notice from the army.

By the late 1980s, a venture, under Calivigny Island Club Ltd (founded in the 1960s by Howard M. Maynard), began plans to create a yachting resort on the island which had become a privately owned resort making it difficult for outside visitors to gain access to its six beaches, although beaches remain part of the public domain under Grenadian law.

In 2000 the island became a private 50-bed resort available for rent on a complete, all-inclusive basis at $140,000 a night. It is owned by Georges Cohen of France.
