= Sugar Loaf Island (Grenada) =

Privately owned island near Grenada's coast

Sugar Loaf Island
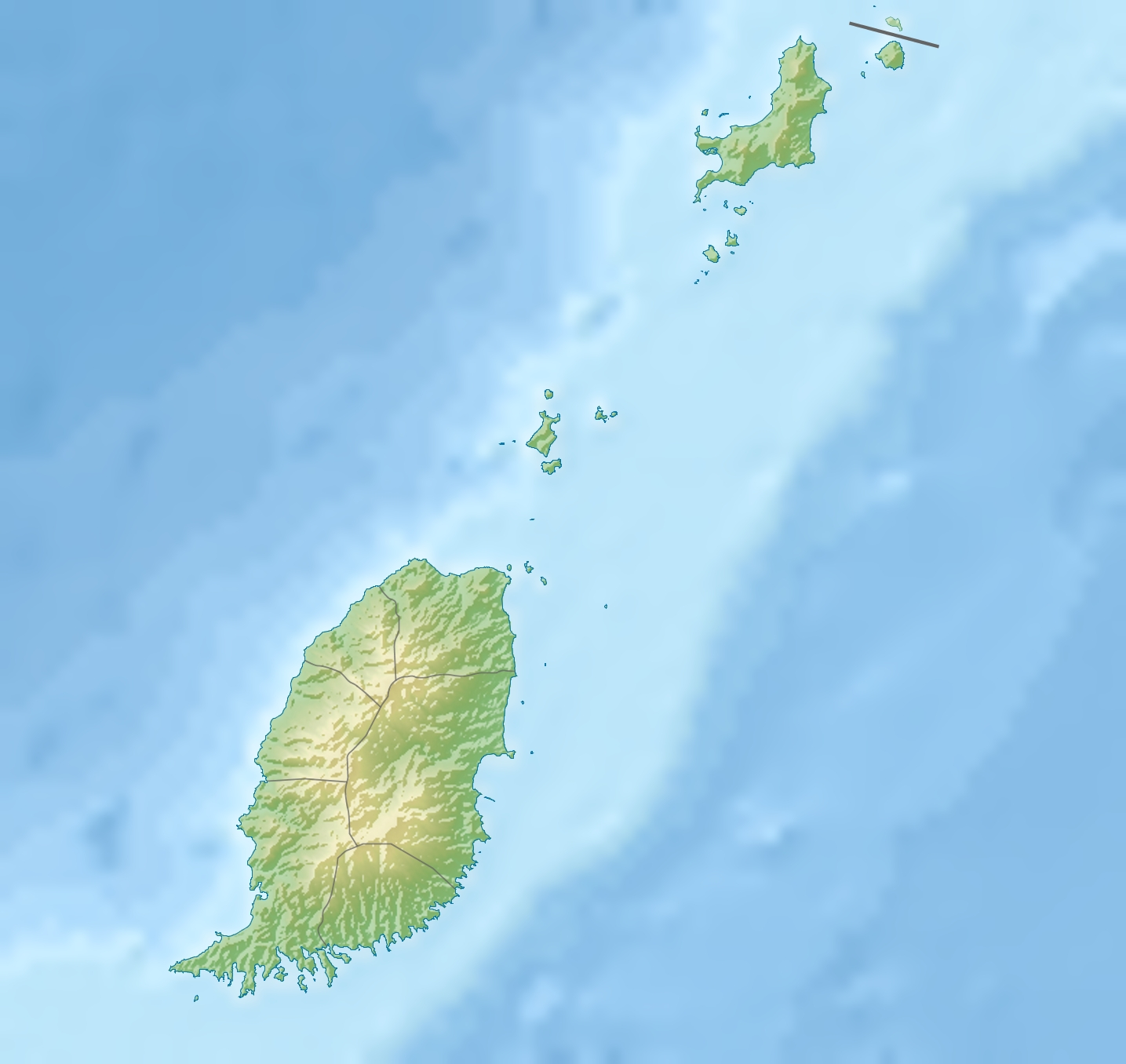
- Location within Grenada Location within Lesser Antilles Location within the Caribbean

Geography
- Location: near Sauteurs
- Coordinates: 12.230°N 61.606°W

Administration
- Grenada

Demographics
- Population: 0 (2013)

Sugar Loaf Island is a small, privately owned island that is located a few hundred metres off the coast of the northeast corner of Grenada, near Levera National Park. It is part of a small archipelago and is near to Green Island and Sandy Island, which are both uninhabited. A cottage is located at the southwest end of the island.
