= Lauriston Airport =

- IATA: CRU; ICAO: TGPZ

Summary
- Airport type: Public
- Operator: Grenada Airports Authority
- Location: Hillsborough, Carriacou, Grenada
- Elevation AMSL: 5 ft / 2 m
- Coordinates: 12°28′37″N 061°28′20″W

Map
- Location in Grenada

Runways
Direction	Length		Surface
Direction	m	ft	Surface
09/27	800	2,625	Asphalt
- Source: Great Circle Mapper

Lauriston Airport (IATA: CRU, ICAO: TGPZ) is an airport located west of Hillsborough, the main town on the island of Carriacou in Grenada. It is also known as Carriacou Island Airport.

== History ==
On 1 July 2024, Hurricane Beryl made landfall on Carriacou as a Category 4 hurricane, with a minimum pressure of 950.0 mb recorded at Lauriston. The storm caused catastrophic damage across the island, and the airport's terminal building was among the infrastructure severely affected. Air traffic control tower outages hindered aid responses in the immediate aftermath.

== Facilities ==
The airport resides at an elevation of 5 ft (2 m) above mean sea level. It has one runway which measures 800 m × 18 m (2,625 ft × 59 ft).
