= Ronde Island =

Private island in the Caribbean Sea

Coordinates: 12°18′N 61°35′W

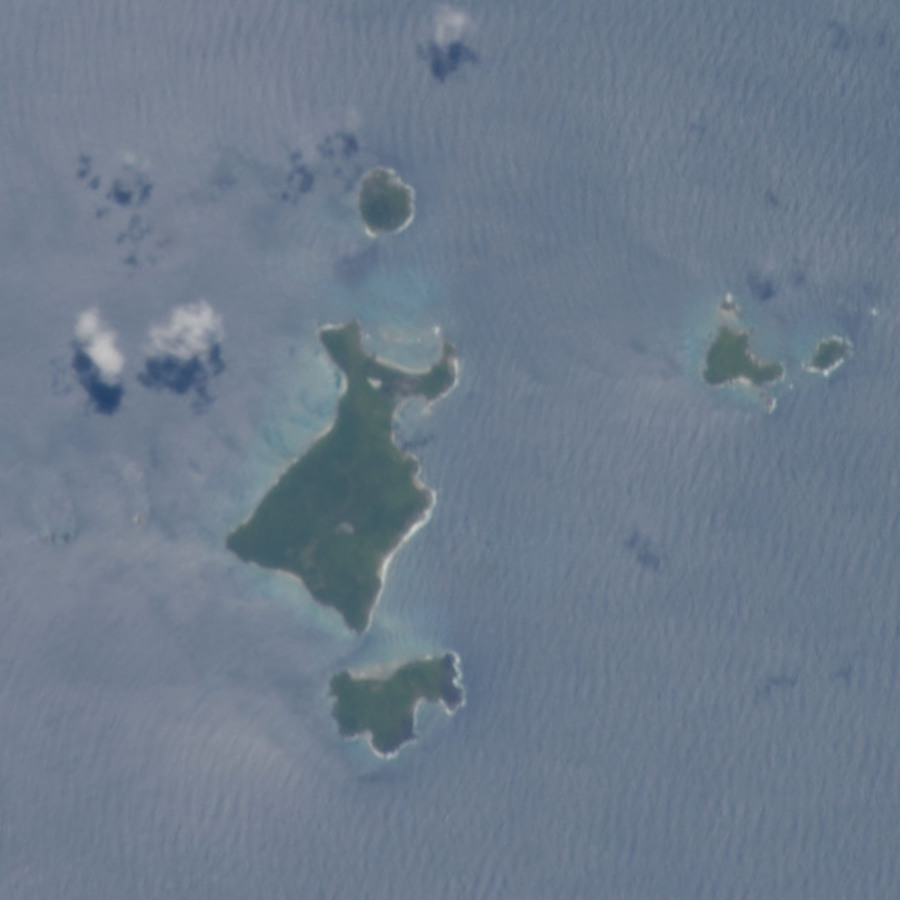
Ronde Island and the surrounding islands

Ronde Island, Grenada is a 2,000-acre (8.1 km^{2}) private island in the Lesser Antilles chain of the Caribbean Sea.

The island was listed for sale as of October 2007 for US$100,000,000, making it at the time the most expensive listed island property in the world.

Historically, the island was inhabited, from which a small community still remains -- making it the third inhabited island in the Grenada Grenadines (after Carriacou and Petite Martinique).

Ronde Island also contains two small ponds and is surrounded by many other islands including Diamond Island (Grenadines), Caille Island, and Les Tantes. The island also provides a habitat for species such as the red-footed tortoise (Chelonoidis carbonarius) and the Grenada tree boa (Corallus grenadensis).

Kick 'em Jenny , an underwater volcano , is located eight kilometers west of Round Island and eight kilometers from the island of Grenada

== See also ==
- List of islands in the Caribbean
