= Mamma Cannes =

- Village
- Location within Grenada
- Coordinates: 12°04′N 61°39′W
- Country: Grenada
- Parish: Saint Andrew
- Elevation: 367 ft (112 m)
- Time zone: UTC-4

Mamma Cannes is a town in Saint Andrew Parish, Grenada. It is located on the eastern coast of the island.
