= Glover Island, Grenada =

Island in Grenada

Coordinates: 11°59′12″N 61°47′13″W

Glover Island is a small islet off the southern peninsula of Grenada.

Glover Island, can be seen from Hardy Bay, True Blue Bay, and the famous St. George's University. It lies 0.723 miles (1.163 km) from the south coast by Maurice Bishop International Airport off the main island of Grenada. It can be seen 1.594 miles (2.566 km) west off L’ance aux Epines by the lighthouse.

== Early whaling history ==
As early as 1869 schooner logbooks reported humpback whales off the southwest coast of Glover Island. This small uninhabited islet subsequently holds an interesting piece of Grenada's history for being the former home to a Norwegian whaling station. In the winter of 1923–1924, to study the feasibility of a commercial whaling operation off Grenada, the Norwegian Arctic explorer Captain Otto Sverdrup and the Director of Winge & Co., Halfdan Bugge, visited the island where Sverdrup, having observed 26 whales, studied the sea currents and recommended that a post be set up on the south of the island (Tønnessen, 1969).

Winge & Co., through its subsidiary, the Grenada Whaling Co., acquired Glover Island as a base for whaling factory which was then directed from Oslo by Halfden Bugge and managed by J. A. Hojem. As early as the mid 19th century, whaleships were plying the waters of the Caribbean and in the 1920s a station was constructed on Glover Island by Norwegian whalers. The station processed whale oil for export and meat for local consumption. The Norwegians took 106 whales during their first year of operations, however, during the second half of the 1920s, the life of Glover Island's whaling station came to a premature end. Through a combination of a decline in whale numbers and new factory ships that could handle the processing themselves, the need for Glover simply disappeared. In 1929, the station was dismantled though the ruins still exist there today.

Until only a few years ago whaling remained a regular profession of native boatmen in the Grenadines, who employed the direct tactic of whaleboat, harpoon, and lance, unchanged from the days described by Herman Melville. Now whales have virtually disappeared, although visitors may see one boat off nearby Bequia which is still kept in readiness.

As recently as 2015 the Petite Calivigny Yacht Club (PCYC) introduced a new event on Father's Day of a boat raft-up and barbecue at Glover Island.
