= Petite Martinique =

Island of Grenada

Native name: Petite Martinik
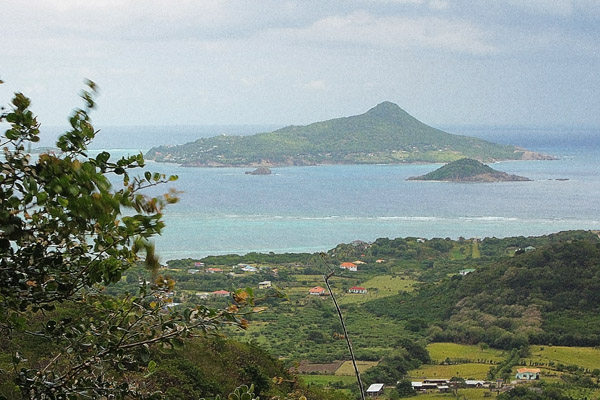
- View of Petite Martinique from Carriacou Island

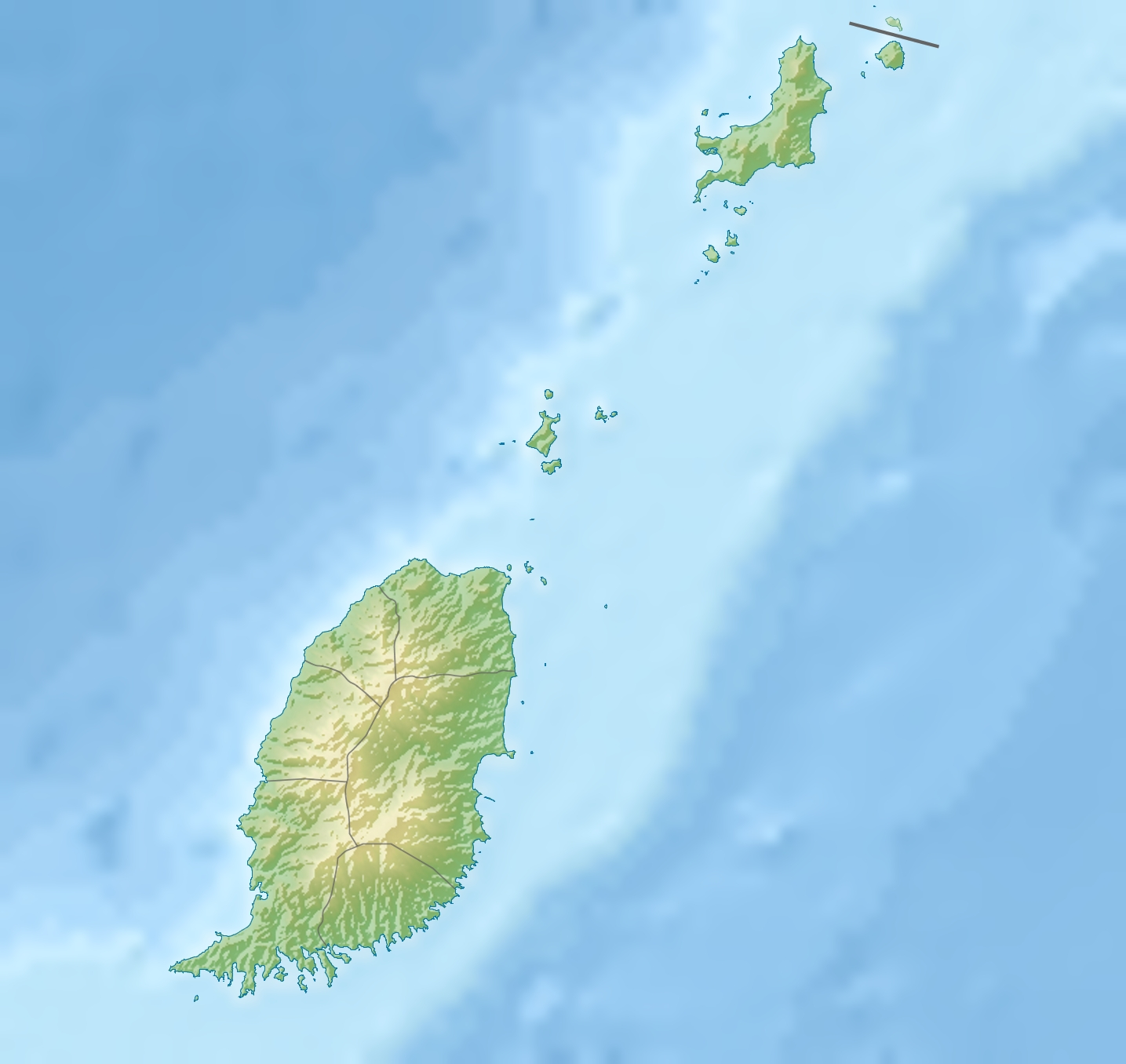
- Location within Grenada Location within Lesser Antilles Location within the Caribbean

Geography
- Location: Caribbean
- Coordinates: 12.518°N 61.385°W
- Archipelago: Grenadines
- Area: 0.9 sq mi (2.3 km^{2})

Administration
- Grenada
- Dependency: Carriacou & Petite Martinique
- Largest settlement: Madame Pierre town
- Prime Minister of Grenada: Dickon Mitchell

Demographics
- Population: 900
- Ethnic groups: Black-Caribbean European (Portuguese, French, British)

Petite Martinique (Petite Martinik) (/ˈpɪ.ti ˌmɑːrtɪˈniːk/ PI-tee MAR-tin-EEK) is one of the islands of Carriacou and Petite Martinique, which is part of Grenada.

It is 4 km (2 1/2 miles) away from Carriacou. With its 586 acres (2.37 km^{2}) and population of 900, it is smaller than Carriacou. Petite Martinique comprises about 9.8% of the total area and 10% of the entire population of Carriacou and Petite Martinique, which is estimated at 10,000. The Capital of Petite Martinique is Madame Pierre town in the north of the island.

== History ==
The first settler on Petite Martinique was Mr. Pierre from Martinique, who left his home island shortly after 1700 seeking new fertile land to grow sugarcane and cotton. The island was owned by him and his wife ('Madame Pierre'), their children and slaves. Hence, the largest village was named Madame Pierre after the wife of the French owner. It is thought that he named the island Petit (little) Martinique because he thought its shape resembled that of Martinique. This Mr Pierre has been identified as being Mr Pierre Philip and his wife was therefore called Madame Pierre (hence the name of the town), the Philip family arrived in Petite Martinique in the 1760s.

=== Colonial history ===
On 27 September 1650, Jacques du Parquet bought Grenada from the Compagnie des Îles de l'Amérique, which was dissolved, for the equivalent of £1160. In 1657, Jacques du Parquet sold Grenada to Jean de Faudoas, Comte de Sérillac for the equivalent of £1890. In 1664, King Louis XIV bought out the independent island owners and established the French West India Company. In 1674 the French West India Company was dissolved. Proprietary rule ended in Grenada, which became a French crown colony.

There are some stone ruins on the island overlooking the sea, these ruins might’ve been used for defence (such as a fort), or an old run down mill or granary.

Petite Martinique was part of the French colony in 1762. It was part of the British West Indies Grenada colony from 1763-1779 and 1783-1974. It was part of the French Grenada colony from 1779-1783. It has been a dependency of Grenada since 1974.

=== Recent history ===
The majority of the inhabitants today are of Indian, Scottish, Portuguese, French and African descent. There is still a British influence on the island as it was colonised by the British Empire and it is part of Grenada, a Commonwealth state. The only French influence is demonstrated in the aforementioned village name, Madame Pierre. However, the local dialect is English-based creole languages. There are also French-Creole remnants on the island.

The Sacred Heart Church was the first Roman Catholic Church on Petite Martinique and the first wooden building. It was destroyed by a hurricane in the 1940s, and the Church standing today was built in 1947.

Though Hurricane Ivan in 2004 dealt a devastating blow to the island of Grenada, Carriacou and Petite Martinique suffered significantly less damage. However, in 2005, Hurricane Emily hit Carriacou, damaging and forcing the evacuation of its only hospital and destroying or damaging hundreds of homes.

In early July 2024, Hurricane Beryl made landfall as a Category 4 storm, causing extensive damage on the island as well as Carriacou. The hurricane devastated the island's power infrastructure, and destroyed cell towers, and it has been estimated that up to 95% of the residences on the island were destroyed or damaged beyond habitability. Communications were almost entirely cut off from the island as a result of the hurricane, hampering response and recovery operations. The water supply for the island was also affected as desalination plants were damaged or taken offline as a result of the storm. No fatalities have been reported on the island as of yet. The humanitarian response to the hurricane's damage was also hampered by rough seas, preventing aid and supplies from reaching the island.

== Education ==
St. Thomas Aquinas School formerly known as Petite Martinique RC School is the only primary school on the island along with the Petite Martinique Pre-Primary School, so other schoolchildren travel by boat to schools in nearby Carriacou.
