= Kick 'em Jenny =

Submarine volcano in the Caribbean Sea

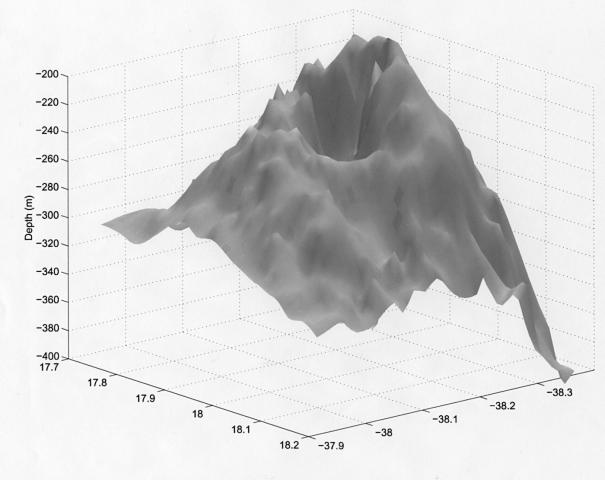
- Sonar image of the submarine Kick-'em-Jenny cone from the NE in 1996.

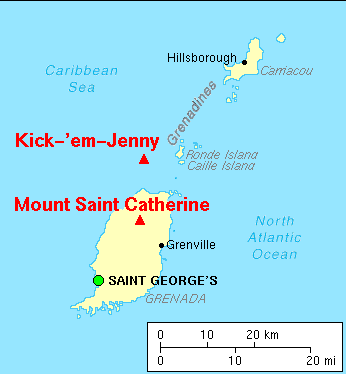
- Location map of submarine volcano Kick-'em-Jenny
- Summit depth: −185 m (−607 ft)
- Height: 1,300 m (4,265 ft)

Location
- Location: Caribbean Sea, north of Grenada
- Coordinates: 12.30°N 61.64°W

Geology
- Type: Submarine volcano (seamount)
- Volcanic arc/chain: Lesser Antilles Volcanic Arc
- Last eruption: April 2017

Kick 'em Jenny (also: Kick-'em-Jenny or Mt. Kick-'Em-Jenny) is an active submarine volcano or seamount on the Caribbean Sea floor, located 8 km (5 mi) north of the island of Grenada and about 8 km (5 mi) west of Ronde Island in the Grenadines. Kick-'em-Jenny rises 1,300 m (4,265 ft) above the sea floor on the steep inner western slope of the Lesser Antilles ridge. The South American tectonic plate is subducting the Caribbean tectonic plate to the east of this ridge and under the Lesser Antilles island arc.

== Etymology ==
The volcano was unknown before 1939, although "Kick 'em Jenny" appeared on earlier maps as either the name of a small island now called Diamond Rock (or Île Diamante), or the name of the strait between Grenada and Ronde Island (or Île de Ronde). The name itself may be a reference to the waters sometimes being extremely rough.

== Activity ==
The first record of the volcano was in 1939, although it must have erupted many times before that date. On 23–24 July 1939 an eruption broke the sea surface, sending a cloud of steam and debris 275 m (902 ft) into the air and generating a series of tsunamis around two metres (6.6 ft) high when they reached the coastlines of northern Grenada and the southern Grenadines. A small tsunami also reached the west coast of nearby Barbados, where "a sea-wave" suddenly washed over a coastal road, most likely at Paynes Bay.

The volcano has erupted on at least twelve occasions between 1939 and 2017 (the last being on April 29, 2017), although no subsequent eruption has been as large as the 1939 one, and most were only detected by seismographs. The larger eruptions have also been heard underwater or on land close to the volcano as a deep rumbling sound.

A submersible survey in 2003 detected a crater with active fumaroles releasing cold and hot gas bubbles. Samples of fresh olivine basalt were collected. An arc-shaped collapse structure appears on the west flank and was the apparent source of a submarine debris avalanche extending 15 km (49,000 ft) down the ridge slope to the west toward the Grenada Basin. The Global Volcanism Program reports the summit to be 185 m (607 ft) below the sea surface.

Signs of elevated seismicity began July 11, 2015, and on July 23 a strong continuous signal was recorded by instruments observing Kick 'em Jenny, prompting authorities to raise the alert level to orange, which is the second-highest level. The following day, July 24, at 02:00 an hourlong explosion event was recorded, scientists from the University of the West Indies Seismic Research Centre observed nothing out of the ordinary at the surface above the volcano during an overflight on 25 July, and by 18:00 no activity was recorded. On 26 July the Alert Level was lowered to Yellow.

In 2017, a team of researchers on the RRS James Cook led by marine geophysicist Jenny Collier observed ongoing volcanic activity at the site.

== Maritime exclusion zone ==
The volcano is on the shipping route from St Vincent to Grenada. There is a Maritime Exclusion Zone monitored by the Seismic Research Centre of the University of the West Indies, Trinidad and Tobago. The zone normally encompasses a circle with a radius of 1.5 km (1 mi) from the centre of the volcano. Bubbles of volcanic gases can lower water density, creating a sinking hazard. This is marked on marine charts. During periods of high seismic activity, the zone is expanded to a 5-kilometre (3.1 mi) radius.

== See also ==
- List of volcanoes in Grenada
