= Hillsborough, Carriacou =

Hillsborough
- City (Town)
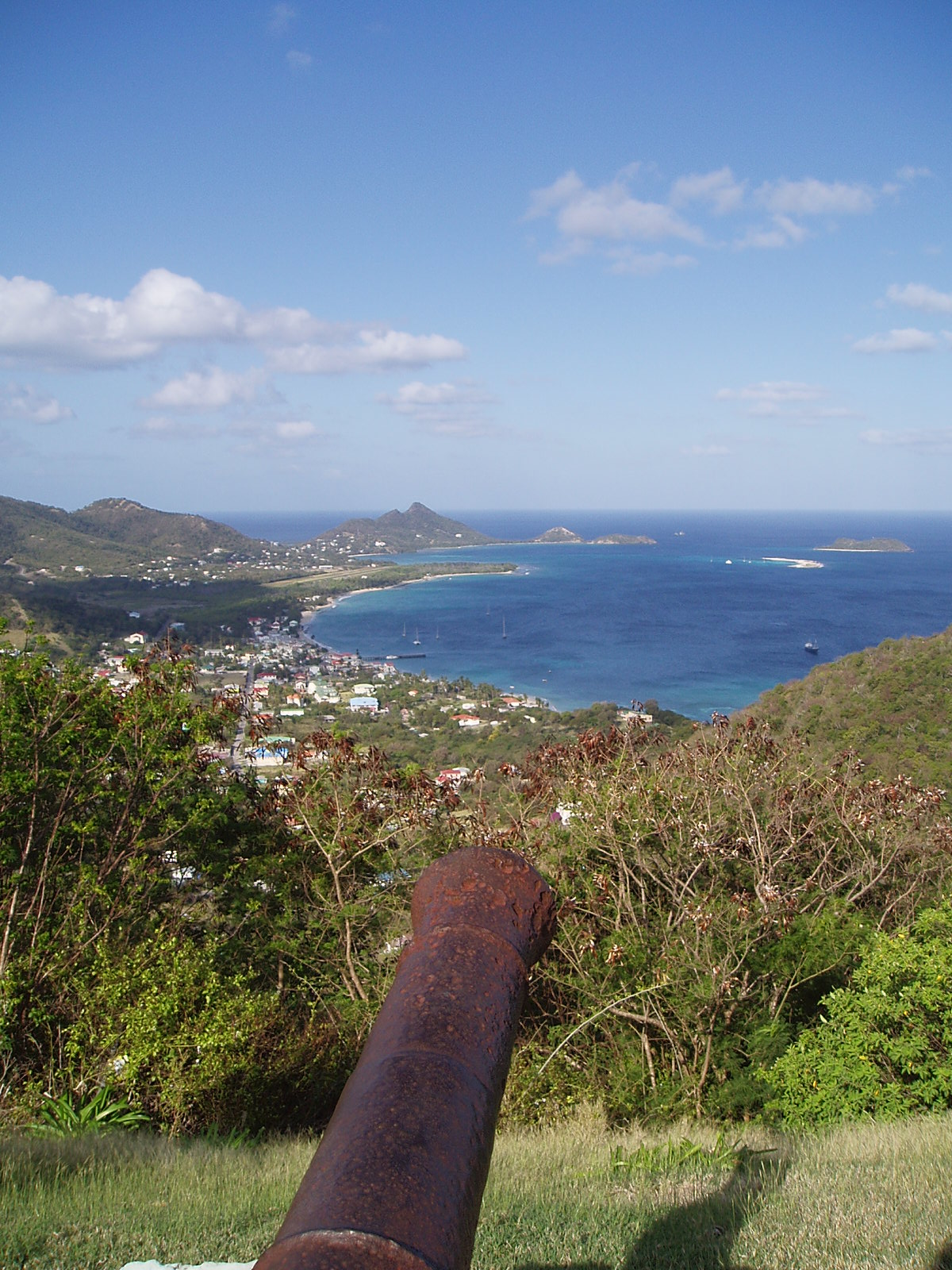
- Hillsborough

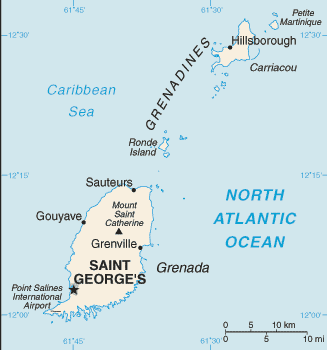
- Hillsborough within Carriacou, Grenada
- Coordinates: 12°29′N 61°28′W
- Country: Grenada
- Dependency: Carriacou and Petite Martinique
- Elevation: 20 ft (6 m)

Population (1999)
  - Total: 1,000
- Time zone: UTC-4

Hillsborough is the largest town (city) on the island of Carriacou, Grenada. The town serves primarily as a retail and administrative centre of both Carriacou and Petite Martinique. It has a population of approximately 1,000 people.

== History ==
In 1796 there were more sailing vessels in Hillsborough Bay when Sir Ralph Abercromby met there to launch an attack on the Spanish. The town is home to Carriacou National Museum, on Paterson Street, which used to be a cotton gin mill. Today the museum is managed by Carriacou Historical Society.

== Education ==
In 2010 there were five government/assisted schools located in the Hillsborough area. Education is free and compulsory up to the age of 16. There are also several tertiary institutions in Hillsborough. Hurricane Berylmade landfall there.

== Economy ==
The port in Hillsborough is the main one on the island. The port also operate the ferry service between Grenada and Petite Martinique and also to other Grenadine islands. All of the banks on Carriacou are situated on Hillsborough's Main Street.

== Transport ==
The island's airport, Lauriston Airport, is approximately 1 km away from the town. It serves as the island's transportation hub for public and private buses (mini-buses) around Carriacou.

== Climate ==
Hillsborough has a tropical savanna climate, with a wet season (June to November) and a dry season (December to May). Summers are hot and wet while Winter is cool and dry.

Month	Jan	Feb	Mar	Apr	May	Jun	Jul	Aug	Sep	Oct	Nov	Dec
Avg high °C (°F)	28 (82.4)	29 (84.2)	29 (84.2)	30 (86)	31 (87.8)	30 (86)	30 (86)	31 (87.8)	31 (87.8)	31 (87.8)	30 (86)	29 (84.2)
Avg low temperature °C (°F)	21 (69.8)	21 (69.8)	21 (69.8)	22 (71.6)	23 (73.4)	23 (73.4)	23 (73.4)	23 (73.4)	23 (73.4)	23 (73.4)	22 (71.6)	22 (71.6)
Source: HolidayCheck.com
