= Saint Andrew Parish, Grenada =

Coordinates: 12°07′09″N 61°37′35″W

Saint Andrew's Parish Paroisse de Saint Andrew
- Parish
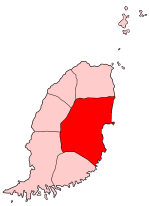
- Country: Grenada
- Capital City: Grenville

Area
  - Total: 35 sq mi (91 km^{2})

Population
  - Total: 26,749
  - Density: 640/sq mi (249/km^{2})
- ISO 3166 code: GD-01

Saint Andrew's is the largest parish in Grenada. The main town is Grenville, which is also Grenada's second largest town after St George's. Grenville is also known as La Baye (its former French name).

== History ==
In the 1650s the French named the parish Morne de Combat and it was part of the French Territories. Marquis was the first Parish Capital from 1795 to 1796, Grenville became capital of Saint Andrew's in 1796.

== Towns ==
- Chutz
- Clabony
- Dunfermline
- Grenville
- Mamma Cannes
- Marquis
- Morne Docteur
- Munich
- Paraclete
- Soubise
- Tillerise
- Tivoli
- Union Village
- Upper Capitol
- Upper Conference
- Upper Pearls
- Harford Village
- Cook Hill
- Gram Bras
- Mt. Horne
- La. Fillete
- Paradise

== Notable people ==
- Allister Bain (1932–2026), actor, screenwriter and playwright
- Conrad Murray (1953–), physician and convicted felon who was the personal doctor of Michael Jackson on the day of Jackson's death in 2009
