= Saint David Parish, Grenada =

St. David Parish
- Parish
- Nickname: The Virgin Parish
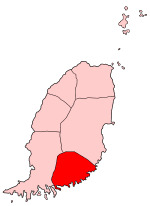
- Coordinates: 12°02′40″N 61°40′50″W
- Country: Grenada

Area
  - Total: 18 sq mi (47 km^{2})

Population
  - Total: 12,486
  - Density: 680/sq mi (261/km^{2})
- ISO 3166 code: GD-02

Saint David's Parish is the fourth-largest of the parishes of Grenada in the island's southeast. The parish's main town (largest village) is St. David's, located between La Tante and Westerhall. Because St David's is so small, the parish is sometimes referred to as "The Virgin Parish".

The parish's eastern coast has spectacular headlands, bays and inlets. The unspoilt rocky coastline slopes up gently towards the central mountainous ridge. It is known for its undeveloped bucolic state and secluded beaches.

== History ==
The town of Megrin was established at St David's Point in 1609 and destroyed during the 1795–96 Fedon conflict and the town never rebuilt. In the 1721 the Catholic parish of Megrin was reopened by the French, but it was built down next to the sea. In 1747 Megrin in St David was one of the six churches and parishes in Grenada. In 1795 the Fedon Rebellion became a battle between Fedon and the English troops staying at the church over night. In Grenada lies the area of Perdmontempts which is a mountainous area which includes many valleys bearing rich fruit such as guava, cherries, plums, mangoes and sugar cane.

The parish was also the home to the New Jewel Movement, which culminated in the Grenada Revolution on 13 March 1979. Its founders, Theodore Victor, aka "Teddy", Sebastian Thomas, Unison Whiteman, and Wally Jeremiah, all discontented with the opposition party Grenada National Party (GNP) under Herbert Blaize decided to build a grass roots movement that would organize and educate the Grenadian masses, publishing a weekly newspaper, The New Jewel.

St David's become the hotbed of political activity in the late 1970s culminating in a confrontation with the Gairy Regime over access to a popular beach LaSagess which had been bought by a British peer, Lord Brownlow, denying natives access to the popular beach. St David's had served the same purpose for Eric Gairy some twenty years earlier when he returned from Aruba to stake his political future. Being funded by rich natives in the St. David's parish Gairy burned plantations and estates in what came to be known as "Sky Red" in a rebellion against British Rule, eventually leading to Grenada's independence in 1974.

St. David's
- Village
- Location within Grenada
- Coordinates: 12°02′15″N 61°40′07″W
- Country: Grenada
- Parish: Saint David
- Elevation: 177 ft (54 m)
- Time zone: UTC-4

== Notable people ==
- Reon Radix, FIFA football referee
