= Saint George Parish, Grenada =

Coordinates: 12°3′N 61°45′W

St. George Parish Paroisse de Saint George
- Parish
- Nickname: The Cathedral Parish
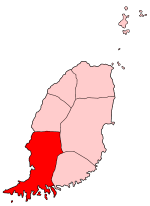
- Country: Grenada
- Capital City: St. George's

Area
  - Total: 26 sq mi (67 km^{2})

Population
  - Total: 40,057
  - Density: 1,420/sq mi (547/km^{2})
- ISO 3166 code: GD-03

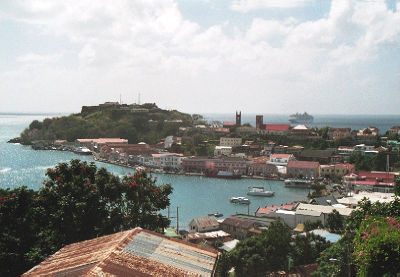
St. George's, Grenada, 2000

Saint George is one of the parishes of Grenada, located on the south-western end of the island. The capital of Grenada, St. George's, is located in this parish. Its horseshoe-shaped harbour is surrounded by the pastel colors of warehouses and it is not uncommon to see red-tiled roofs on traditional shops and homes. Saint George is also the home of the world-famous Grand Anse Beach and many of the island's holiday resorts.

The peninsula at the south-western tip of Saint George is called Point Salines, and the only active airport on the island of Grenada, Maurice Bishop International Airport, is located there. The tourist infrastructure is more extensive in Saint George than in the rest of the island, due to the airport, capital city and most popular beaches all being found in this parish. It is also home to St. George's University.

As of 2001, Saint George has a population of 35,559, making it the most populous parish of Grenada. It is also the second largest, with an area of 26 sq mi (67 km^{2}).

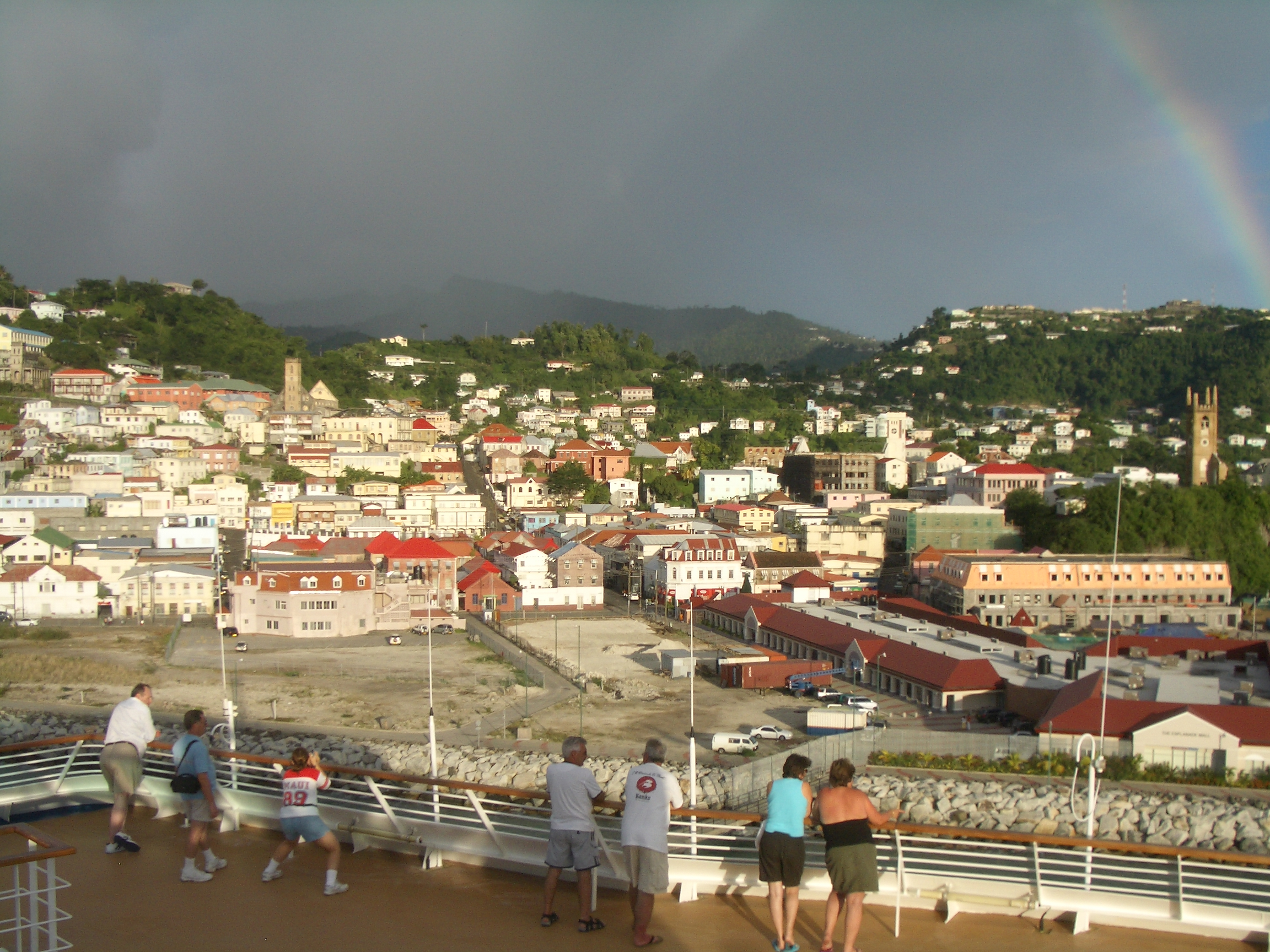
View of the town from visiting cruise ship

== See also ==
- Ka-fe Beau
