= Saint Patrick Parish, Grenada =

Coordinates: 12°12′11″N 61°38′26″W

Saint Patrick Crown City Paroisse de Saint Patrick
- Parish
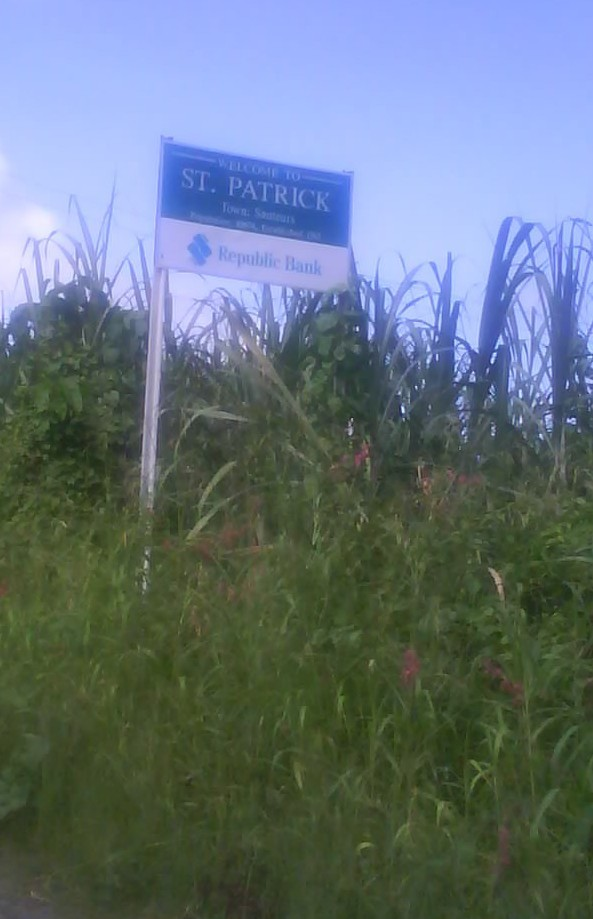
- St Patrick parish sign
- Nicknames: The Agriculture Parish; The Historical Parish
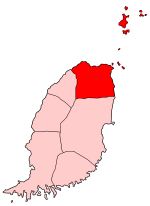
- Country: Grenada
- Capital City: Sauteurs

Area
  - Total: 17 sq mi (44 km^{2})

Population
  - Total: 10,674
  - Density: 660/sq mi (253/km^{2})
- ISO 3166 code: GD-06

Saint Patrick is one of the Catholic parishes of Grenada, covering the north of the country.

== Attractions ==
A spectacular coastline with several fine bays faces several small islands to the north. Its most famous beach is Bathway Beach. The principal town in St. Patrick is Sauteurs. One landmark is Leapers' Hill, where legend states approximately 40 Indigenous Caribs jumped over the cliff and into the sea to escape colonization by the French. Several volcanic cones and craters are located within the parish, such as Punchbowl and Lake Antoine.

== History ==
In the 18th and 19th Centuries, Irvin's Bay was a working harbour for shipping sugar and other produce. Goods were grown in nearby estates and the Bay House and were sent to England and France. In 1867, the Maidstone sailing ship carried 289 Indians from Calcutta to Irvin's Bay to address a labour shortage on Grenada estates.

For much of the twentieth century, the parish was agricultural with several large estates accounting for a significant share of cocoa and nutmeg production in Grenada.
