= Parishes of Grenada =

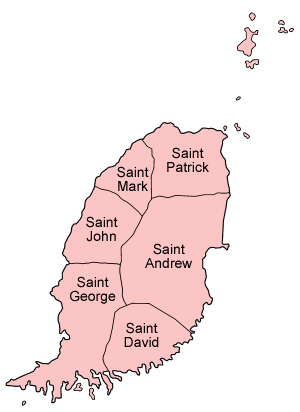
- Category: Parish
- Location: Grenada
- Number: 6

The Caribbean island country of Grenada is divided into regions known as parishes.

A parish defines a territorial unit or region that, historically, was usually an area under the pastoral care served by a local church as an ecclesiastical administrative unit (see Parish) and later used by map-makers to set boundaries to an area of land. Traditionally a settlement or village would centre on a church and later grow to become a town and then even a city. Therefore, a parish has now come to mean an administrative division and is used so by several countries as the smallest unit (or lowest tier) of local government.

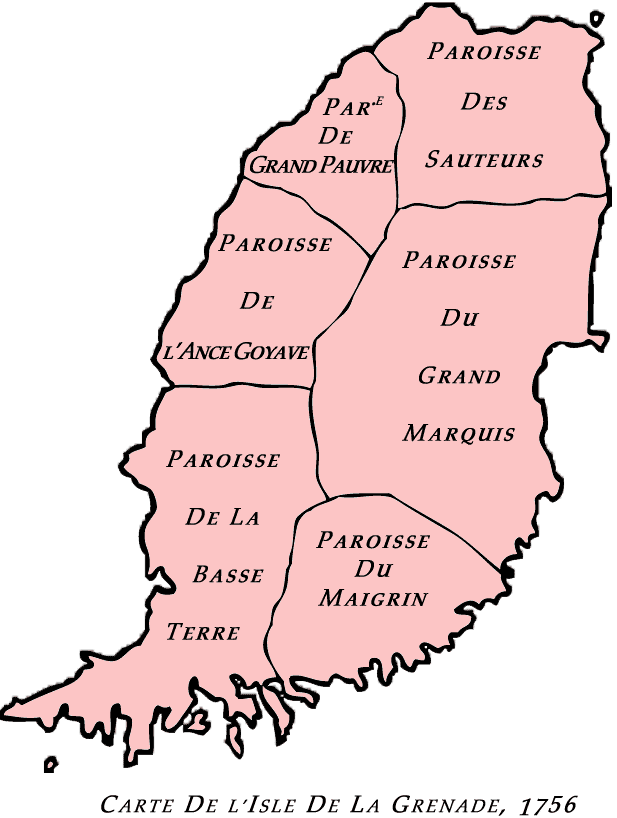
Map of the parishes of Grenada in 1756

The differing size and shape of each parish was primarily influenced by the island's earlier history and land that was granted to the first settlers that claimed that territory during the colonial years of the island.

Two decades after Barbados was settled the French governor of Martinique, Jacques Dyel du Parquet, purchased Grenada from a French company and in 1650 established a settlement at what was to be Fort Royal in the parish of the low lands (Ville Ft. Royal situé à Paroisse de la Basse Terre). During this time the parish boundaries were laid out.

The French cartographer Jacques-Nicolas Bellin (1703–1772) draw several editions of a chart of the island of Grenada showing the earlier French parish divisions and was published as Carte de L'Isle de la Grenade in Paris 1756.

However, by 1763 the island was under British rule and a later map of the Island of Grenada showing towns and villages and division of the island into quarters in English by cartographer Bryon Edwards (for J. Cooke's History of the West Indies) was engraved in 1818.

After a century the French capitulated to the British and formally ceded the island to Britain in 1763 by the Treaty of Paris. The English took over the churches and, as was traditional, chapels of ease and local churches were elevated to parish church status across the island, leading to the formation of new parishes surrounding those newly named churches. The six boundaries or borders of these parishes having already been well established in the mindset of the people then living simply took on the names of these churches.

The nation's capital St. George's, which is located within the parish of Saint George, and even to this day the original parishional border-lines are still well defined.

== Parishes and dependency ==

Parish	Capital	Area (km^{2})	Population (2011 census)	Density (km^{−2})
Saint Andrew	Grenville	99	26,503	267.71
Saint David	—	44	12,877	292.66
Saint George	St. George's	65	38,251	588.48
Saint John	Gouyave	35	8,466	241.89
Saint Mark	Victoria	25	4,406	176.24
Saint Patrick	Sauteurs	42	10,503	250.07
Two islands of Grenada are jointly administered under the status of dependency: Carriacou and Petite Martinique.
Carriacou	Hillsborough	34	5,661	166.5
Petite Martinique	North Village	2.4	900	375.00
Grenada	St. George's	344	106,667	310.08

== See also ==
- ISO 3166-2:GD
- List of Caribbean First-level Subdivisions by Total Area
- Commonwealth Local Government Forum-Americas
