= 2018–19 GFA Premier League =

Season in the GFA Premier League

GFA Premier League
- Season: 2018–19
- Matches: 60
- Goals: 194 (3.23 per match)
- Top goalscorer: (Grenada) Keno Alexander (Grenada) Jose McIntosh Jr (14 goals each)
- Biggest home win: Paradise 10-0 Mount Rich (30 September 2018)
- Highest scoring: Paradise 10-0 Mount Rich (30 September 2018)
- Longest winning run: St. John's (7)
- Longest unbeaten run: St. John's (10)
- Longest winless run: FC Camerhogne (7)
- Longest losing run: Happy Hill (6)

The 2018–19 GFA Premier League is the 35th season of the GFA Premier League, the top division football competition in Grenada. The season began on 24 August 2018.

== Team information ==
Team	City	Stadium
Eagles Super Strikers	Sauteurs	Fond Playing Field
FC Camerhogne	St. George's	Queen's Park Playing Field
GBSS	St. George's	Roy St. John Playing Field
Happy Hill	Morne Docteur	Beauséjour Playing Field
Hard Rock	Sauteurs	Fond Playing Field
Hurricanes	Victoria	Alston George Park
Mount Rich	Sauteurs	Fond Playing Field
Paradise	Paradise	Progress Park
Queens Park Rangers	St. George's	Queen's Park Playing Field
St. John's	Gouyave	Cuthbert Peters Park

== League table ==
Pos	Team	Pld	W	D	L	GF	GA	GD	Pts	Qualification or relegation
1	Paradise (C)	18	13	3	2	48	15	+33	42	Caribbean Club Shield
2	St. John's	18	12	4	2	35	13	+22	40	
3	Hurricanes	18	11	2	5	41	22	+19	35	
4	Hard Rock	18	9	1	8	29	28	+1	28	
5	FC Camerhogne	18	6	4	8	22	26	−4	22	
6	Queens Park Rangers	18	6	4	8	25	34	−9	22	
7	Mount Rich	18	6	3	9	24	41	−17	21	
8	GBSS	18	4	5	9	23	29	−6	17	
9	Eagles Super Strikers (R)	18	3	7	8	25	38	−13	16	Relegated to GFA First Division
10	Happy Hill (R)	18	1	3	14	20	46	−26	6	Relegated to GFA First Division

Source: Soccerway
(C) Champions; (R) Relegated

== Results ==
Home \ Away	EAG	FCC	GBS	HAP	HAR	HUR	MOU	PAR	QPR	STJ
Eagles Super Strikers		3–1	1–3	5–4	1–1	0–2		2–2	1–1	
FC Camerhogne			1–1	2–2	1–0	3–1	3–1	1–2		0–0
GBSS	0–1	4–1			1–2	0–1	1–2	1–1		0–1
Happy Hill	4–4	0–2	0–0		1–3		3–2	1–3	2–3	2–4
Hard Rock	2–1	0–1	2–3	2–1		0–3	1–2		4–0	
Hurricanes	5–0	2–1	4–2	3–0	2–3				0–1	1–1
Mount Rich	1–1	3–0	1–1		1–2	1–1		2–4	1–0	0–2
Paradise	5–1	3–1		3–0	1–0	3–2	10–0		2–0	1–0
Queens Park Rangers		1–0	3–0	3–2		0–3	0–1	1–1		2–4
St. John's	2–2		3–0	2–0	1–0	3–1	3–0	1–0	3–3	

Updated to match(es) played on 19 February 2019. Source: Soccerway
Legend: Blue = home team win; Yellow = draw; Red = away team win.

== Season Statistics ==
=== Top Scorers ===
Rank	Player	Team	Goals
1	(Grenada) Keno Alexander	Hard Rock	14
1	(Grenada) Jose McIntosh Jr.	Eagles Super Strikers	14
3	(Grenada) Jake Rennie	Paradise	10
4	(Grenada) Quinton Bain	Happy Hill	9
4	(Grenada) Joshua Issac	Paradise	9
6	(Grenada) Lemoy Augustine	Hurricanes	8
6	(Grenada) Romar Frank	Camerhogne	8
8	(Grenada) Steffon Abraham	Paradise	7
8	(Grenada) Kimo Sampson	St. John's	7
10	(Grenada) Kithson Bain	Happy Hill	6
10	(Grenada) Brian Andrews	Queens Park Rangers	6
10	(Grenada) Rickell Charles	Queens Park Rangers	6
10	(Grenada) Travis Rennie	Paradise	6

=== Hat-tricks ===
Player	For	Against	Result	Date
(Grenada) Travis Rennie	Paradise	Eagles Super Strikers	5–1	2 September 2018
(Grenada) Kimo Sampson	St. John's	Happy Hill	4–2	23 September 2018
(Grenada) Jake Rennie	Paradise	Mount Rich	10–0	30 September 2018
(Grenada) Joshua Isaac^{4}	Paradise	Mount Rich	10–0	30 September 2018
(Grenada) Rahim Stephen	GBSS	Eagles Super Strikers	3–1	14 October 2018
(Grenada) Jose McIntosh Jr.	Eagles Super Strikers	Happy Hill	4–4	8 December 2018

^{4} Player scored 4 goals
