= 2015 GFA Premier Division =

GFA Premier Division
- Season: 2015
- Champions: Carib Hurricane

The 2015 GFA Premier Division was the 33rd season of top-division football in Grenada. The competition began on 23 May 2015 and concluded on 24 October 2015. The league title was won by Carib Hurricane who achieved a record-tying fourth title. It was also their first title since 2008.

== Teams ==
A total of 10 teams are taking part in the league. The three newcomers were New Hampshire United, Chantimelle, and Boca Juniors, who finished atop the 2014 GFA First Division table. These clubs replaced the relegated Mount Rich, Happy Hill and Five Stars. Half of the clubs were located in the capital area (St. George's) while the rest were dispersed among the northern tracts of the main island.

Location of teams in the GFA Premier Division 2015

Club	Location	Venue	Capacity
Boca Juniors	The Bocas	La Borie Field	200
Carib Hurricane	Victoria	Alston George Park	1,000
Chantimelle	Chantimelle	Chantimelle R.C. School Field	100
Fontenoy United	St. George's	National Cricket Stadium	20,000
GBSS	St. George's	Maryshow Field	700
Hard Rock	Sauteurs	Fond Recreation Ground	1,000
New Hampshire United	St. George's	Grenada National Stadium	10,000
Paradise	Paradise	Progress Park	1,000
Queens Park Rangers	St. George's	Grenada National Stadium	10,000
St. John's	Gouyave	Cutbert Peters Park	400

== Table ==
Pos	Team	Pld	W	D	L	GF	GA	GD	Pts	Qualification or relegation
1	Carib Hurricane (C)	18	11	5	2	33	12	+21	38	Champions, 2016 CFU Club Championship
2	Paradise	18	12	1	5	38	18	+20	37	2016 CFU Club Championship
3	Boca Juniors	18	11	2	5	33	20	+13	35	
4	St. John's Sports	18	9	4	5	25	20	+5	31	
5	Queens Park Rangers	18	9	2	7	38	26	+12	29	
6	Chantimelle	18	9	2	7	31	30	+1	29	
7	Hard Rock	18	5	4	9	27	26	+1	19	
8	Fontenoy United (O)	18	6	1	11	22	38	−16	19	Qualification to Relegation playoffs
9	GBSS (R)	18	5	3	10	17	28	−11	18	Relegation to GFA First Division
10	New Hampshire United (R)	18	1	0	17	8	54	−46	3	Relegation to GFA First Division

Updated to match(es) played on 4 May 2016.
Source: https://www.rsssf.org/tablesg/grenada2015.html
(C) Champions;
(O) Play-off winners;
(R) Relegated

== Results ==
=== Relegation playoffs ===
The relegation/promotion playoffs took place between the 8th placed GFA Premier Division club, and the 3rd placed GFA First Division club.

8 November 2015
16:00
First leg

Royal Grenada Police Force	0–1	Fontenoy United
	Report

Grenada National Stadium, St. George's

21 November 2015
16:00
Second leg

Fontenoy United	0–1 (a.e.t.)	Royal Grenada Police Force
	Report
Penalties
	4–3

National Cricket Stadium, St. George's

1–1 on aggregate. Fontenoy United won 4–3 on penalties and remain in the GFA Premier Division
