= 2017–18 GFA Premier Division =

GFA Premier Division
- Season: 2017–18

The 2017–18 GFA Premier Division is the 34th season of top-division football in Grenada. The season began on 24 June 2017.

== Standings ==
Pos	Team	Pld	W	D	L	GF	GA	GD	Pts	Qualification or relegation
1	Hurricanes	19	15	2	2	46	16	+30	47	
2	Paradise	20	14	2	4	51	18	+33	44	
3	Hard Rock	20	12	4	4	31	20	+11	40	
4	St. John's	20	9	4	7	35	23	+12	31	
5	Eagles Super Strikers	20	7	7	6	35	32	+3	28	
6	Queens Park Rangers	19	8	3	8	36	34	+2	27	
7	Mount Rich	20	7	4	9	32	38	−6	25	
8	GBSS	19	5	5	9	24	35	−11	20	
9	Chantimelle	20	5	4	11	22	39	−17	19	Relegation to GFA First Division
10	SAB Spartans	19	4	2	13	21	43	−22	14	Relegation to GFA First Division
11	T.A. Marryshow Community College	20	2	3	15	17	52	−35	9	Relegation to GFA First Division

Source: RSSSF

Note: remaining two matches annulled as teams involved were unwilling to play
