= 2019–20 GFA Premier League =

Season in the GFA Premier League

GFA Premier League
- Season: 2019–20
- Dates: 4 January – 29 August 2020
- Caribbean Club Shield: Hurricanes

The 2019–20 GFA Premier League was the 36th season of the GFA Premier League, the top division football competition in Grenada. Instead of a normal league competition, a cup competition, branded as the 2020 GFA Club Championship was played. The season began on 4 January 2020 and was scheduled to end on 22 March 2020, but was postponed for five months due to the COVID-19 pandemic. The final rounds of the season were played from 15 August 2020 until 29 August 2020.

== Group stage ==
=== Group A ===
1.Hurricanes SC                  3   3  0  0  14- 1   9  Qualified
- - - - - - - - - - - - - - - - - - - - - - - - - - - -
2.Queens Park Rangers FC 1969    3   2  0  1  14- 7   6
3.St. Andrew's Football League   3   1  0  2   7-10   3
4.Tempe All Blacks               3   0  0  3   0-17   0

=== Group B ===
1.Grenada Boys Secondary School  3   2  1  0  13- 2   7  Qualified
- - - - - - - - - - - - - - - - - - - - - - - - - - - -
2.FC Camerhogne                  3   2  1  0   8- 2   7
3.Sunjets                        2   0  0  2   1- 7   0
4.Five Stars                     2   0  0  2   1-12   0

=== Group C ===
1.Fontenoy United                3   3  0  0   9- 2   9  Qualified
- - - - - - - - - - - - - - - - - - - - - - - - - - - -
2.Combined Northerners           3   2  0  1  13- 3   6
3.Morne Jaloux                   3   1  0  2   4-12   3
4.Mount Rich SC                  3   0  0  3   1-10   0

=== Group D ===
1.Shamrock                       2   2  0  0  10- 2   6  Qualified
- - - - - - - - - - - - - - - - - - - - - - - - - - - -
2.Springs                        2   1  0  1   4- 8   3
3.Royal Grenada Police Force     2   0  0  2   1- 5   0
-.Paradise FC International      withdrew

=== Group E ===
1.SAB Spartans SC                3   2  1  0  12- 6   7  Qualified
- - - - - - - - - - - - - - - - - - - - - - - - - - - -
2.Happy Hill SC                  3   2  0  1  10- 7   6
3.Honved                         3   1  0  2  11-10   3
4.St. David's FC                 3   0  1  2   4-14   1

=== Group F ===
1.Eagles Super Strikers          3   3  0  0  14- 7   9  Qualified
- - - - - - - - - - - - - - - - - - - - - - - - - - - -
2.Grenada U-17                   2   1  0  1   4- 2   3
3.North Stars                    3   1  0  2   4- 7   3
4.Carenage                       2   0  0  2   4-10   0

=== Group G ===
1.Hard Rock FC                   2   2  0  0   4- 0   6  Qualified
- - - - - - - - - - - - - - - - - - - - - - - - - - - -
2.Grenada U-20                   2   1  0  1   2- 2   3
3.Christian Strikers             2   0  0  2   1- 5   0

NB: a fourth team was to be invited for this group but apparently no interested club could be found.

=== Group H ===
1.St. John's Sports              3   3  0  0  28- 2   9  Qualified
- - - - - - - - - - - - - - - - - - - - - - - - - - - -
2.Chantimelle                    3   2  0  1  11- 3   6
3.Mt. Horne Sports Club          2   0  0  2   1- 8   0
4.Belle Vue Rangers              2   0  0  2   0-27   0

== Knock-out stage ==
=== Quarterfinals ===
First legs played on 14–15 February 2020, second legs played on 28–29 February 2020.

Team 1	Agg.	Team 2	1st leg	2nd leg
Fontenoy United	4–3	Shamrock	2–1	2–2
Hard Rock	4–3	St. John's Sports	1–1	3–2
GBSS	2–7	SAB Spartans	2–1	0–6
Hurricanes	6–3	Eagles Super Strikers	1–1	5–2

=== Semifinals ===
First legs played on 15–16 August 2020, second legs played on 22–23 August 2020. All matches played at the Kirani James Athletic Stadium.

Team 1	Agg.	Team 2	1st leg	2nd leg
Hurricanes	7–5	Hard Rock	3–1	4–4
SAB Spartans	6–7	Fontenoy United	3–4	3–3

=== Third place match ===
29 August 2020

Hard Rock	4–1	SAB Spartans

Kirani James Athletic Stadium, St. George's

=== Final ===
29 August 2020

Hurricanes	3–1	Fontenoy United

Kirani James Athletic Stadium, St. George's
