= Marcus Julien =

Grenadian footballer

Personal information
- Full name: Marcus Ashin Julien
- Date of birth: 30 December 1986 (age 39)
- Place of birth: La Fortune, Saint Patrick Parish, Grenada
- Height: 1.76 m (5 ft 9 1/2 in)
- Position: Forward

Team information
- Current team: North Imphal Sporting Association
- Number: 9

Senior career*
Years	Team	Apps	(Gls)
2004–2006	Paradise FC		
2006–2010	Eagles Super Strikers		
2011–2013	NISA Manipur	25	(18)
2013–2015	Eagles Super Strikers		
2015–2016	Boca Juniors Grenada		

International career
2006–	Grenada	33	(4)
Medal record
Men's football
Representing Grenada
Caribbean Cup
Runner-up	2008 Jamaica
- * Club domestic league appearances and goals

Marcus Julien (born 30 December 1986) is a Grenadian professional football player. He plays predominantly as a striker for the Grenada national football team and last played for Boca Juniors Grenada in the GFA First Division.

== Club career ==
=== Paradise ===
Julien began his senior club career at GFA Premier Division side Paradise FC International in 2004. With Paradise, he has appeared in Grenada Premier Division for a season and won the tournament in 2005, alongside becoming the runners-up in 2004.

=== Eagles Super Strikers ===
In 2006, he signed with another GFA Premier Division outfit Eagles Super Strikers where he played until his move to Paradise again.

=== NISA Manipur ===
In 2011, Julien moved to India and signed a contract with North Imphal Sporting Association (NISA Manipur), which was newly promoted to the I-League 2nd Division after winning the Manipur State League in 2010. Julien has appeared in the league where they were in group A with United Sikkim FC, Gauhati Town Club, Southern Samity, Langsning FC, Simla Youngs FC, and Golden Threads FC.

He scored his first goal in a 3–0 win match against Simla Youngs. They finished their campaign with 9 points and didn't qualify for the final round (Play-offs).

Between 2011 and 2012, he appeared in 25 times in both the leagues and he was also in the squad as the defending champion North Imphal Sporting Association of Thangmeiband, retained themselves as the champions in the 6th Manipur State League in 2011. He scored a total of 18 goals before moving to his previous club Eagles Super Strikers.

=== Back to Eagles ===
After his stint with NISA, he came back to Grenada and signed with his previous club Eagles Super Strikers in 2013.

=== Boca Juniors Grenada ===
From 2015 to 2016, he played for Boca Juniors Grenada in the GFA Premier League.

== International career ==
Julien made his international debut for Grenada national team on 5 November 2006 against Barbados in a friendly match, which ended as a 2–2 draw. He scored his first goal against Barbados in the 2008 Caribbean Cup match. In that tournament Grenada finished as the runners-up, losing 2–0 to Jamaica.

He has also represented Grenada in competitions like CONCACAF Gold Cup in 2009 and 2011 alongside 2014, 2018 and 2022 FIFA World Cup qualifiers. In 2014, he was also in the squad of Grenada at the 2014 New York Caribbean Cup Soccer Championship.

Since 2010, he has earned 37 international caps for his country, scoring 7 goals.

== Career statistics ==
=== International goals ===
Scores and results list Grenada's goal tally first.

#	Date	Venue	Opponent	Score	Result	Competition
1	2008-07-12	Greenfield Stadium, Trelawny, Jamaica	Barbados	2–0	4–2	2008 Caribbean Cup
2	2010-05-30	Progress Park, St. Andrew's, Grenada	Martinique	2–1	2–2	Friendly
3	2011-10-07	FFB Stadium, Belmopan, Belize	Belize	2–0	4–1	2014 FIFA World Cup qualification (CONCACAF)
4	2012-02-22	Grenada National Stadium, Grenada	Guyana	1–0	1–2	Friendly

== Honours ==
Grenada

- Caribbean Cup: runner-up 2008

Paradise International

- Grenada Premier Division: 2005; runner-up: 2004

NISA Manipur

- Manipur State League: 2011

== See also ==
- Grenada men's international footballers
