= Shavon John-Brown =

Grenadian footballer (born 1995)

Personal information
- Full name: Shavon Owner John-Brown
- Date of birth: 13 April 1995 (age 31)
- Place of birth: Montreal, Quebec, Canada
- Height: 1.73 m (5 ft 8 in)
- Position: Forward

Team information
- Current team: Spokane Velocity
- Number: 11

College career
Years	Team	Apps	(Gls)
2014–2015	Bryant & Stratton Bobcats	13+	(7+)
2016–2017	Alderson Broaddus Battlers	39	(15)

Senior career*
Years	Team	Apps	(Gls)
2011–2013	Hard Rock FC		(8+)
2017	Charlotte Eagles	5	(0)
2018	Crown City Strikers	0	(0)
2018	Brooklyn Italians	1	(0)
2018	Hard Rock FC		
2018	New York Pancyprian-Freedoms		(8)
2019	1. FCA Darmstadt	7	(5)
2019	Brooklyn Italians	2+	(0+)
2019	New York Cosmos B	0	(0)
2019	→ New York Pancyprian-Freedoms (loan)		
2020	New York Cosmos	7	(1)
2021	New Amsterdam	24	(7)
2022	El Paso Locomotive	12	(0)
2023	New York Pancyprian-Freedoms		
2023	New York Renegades		
2024	Central Valley Fuego	19	(3)
2025–	Spokane Velocity	48	(11)

International career^{‡}
2010	Grenada U17	3	(2)
2012	Grenada U20	3	(0)
2012–	Grenada	42	(5)
- * Club domestic league appearances and goals as of 1 November 2026 ‡ National team caps and goals as of 12 October 2025

Shavon Owner John-Brown (born 13 April 1995) is a footballer who plays as a forward for Spokane Velocity in the USL League One. Born in Canada, he represents the Grenada national team.

== Early life ==
John-Brown was born in Montreal, Quebec to Grenadian parents. At a young age, he returned with his family to their home village of River Sallee, St. Patrick.

== Club career ==
John-Brown played for Hard Rock FC in the Grenada League Premier Division. In his debut season he scored eight goals for the club, assisting them on their way to the league title.

In April 2021, John-Brown joined National Independent Soccer Association side New Amsterdam FC ahead of the spring 2021 season.

John-Brown signed with USL Championship club El Paso Locomotive FC on March 1, 2022. He made 12 appearances for the club before an injury left him sidelined until his departure from the club following the 2022 season.

John-Brown rejoined New York Pancyprian-Freedoms in 2023. John-Brown also joined the New York Renegades United Premier Soccer League side that same year.

On 7 March 2024, John-Brown joined USL League One side Central Valley Fuego.

== International career ==
John-Brown earned his first cap for the Grenada national team on 22 February 2012, coming on as a substitute in a friendly against Guyana.

He had previously played three games for the under-17 squad. He scored two goals at this level, both coming in Grenada's 4–3 victory over Saint Vincent and the Grenadines in a 2011 CONCACAF U-17 Championship qualifying match.

== Career statistics ==
=== International goals ===
Scores and results list Grenada's goal tally first.

No	Date	Venue	Opponent	Score	Result	Competition
1.	22 March 2016	Kirani James Athletic Stadium, St. George's, Grenada	Sint Maarten	4–0	5–0	2017 Caribbean Cup qualification
2.	1 June 2016	Kirani James Athletic Stadium, St. George's, Grenada	Puerto Rico	1–0	3–3	2017 Caribbean Cup qualification
3.	1 June 2016	Kirani James Athletic Stadium, St. George's, Grenada	Puerto Rico	2–0	3–3	2017 Caribbean Cup qualification
4.	30 June 2017	Fond Playing Field, Sauteurs, Grenada	Saint Lucia	2–0	2–0	2017 Windward Islands Tournament
5.	11 October 2025	Kirani James Athletic Stadium, St. George's, Grenada	Cuba	2–0	2–0	Friendly

== Honours ==
Hard Rock

- Grenada League Premier Division: 2011

New York Cosmos B

- NPSL North Atlantic Conference Champion: 2019
- NPSL Northeast Region Champion: 2019
- Great Midwest Athletic Conference Offensive Player of the Year: 2016
