= GFA Super Knockout Cup =

Association football tournament in Grenada

The GFA Super Knockout Cup, Grenada Super Cup or simply known as the GFA Cup, is the biggest cup tournament held for association football teams in Grenada. It is run and overseen by the Grenada Football Association. It is held for football clubs competing in the GFA Premier League, GFA First and Second Division annually.

Paradise FC International are the most successful club in this tournament; they have four GFA Cups and have never lost a final.

== Winners ==
- 2009 - Paradise FC International bt Police of Grenada FC
- 2010 - Eagles Super Strikers FC bt Grenada Boys' Secondary School FC
- 2011 - Hurricanes SC drw Grenada Boys' Secondary School FC [Hurricane on pen]
- 2012 - Paradise International FC 4-4 Hard Rock FC [6-5 pen]
- 2013 - Hard Rock FC 5-2 Hurricanes SC
- 2014 - Hurricanes SC 3-1 Grenada Boys' Secondary School FC
- 2015 - Paradise International FC 1-0 Hurricanes SC
- 2016 - Paradise International FC 4-1 Hard Rock FC
- 2017 - Hurricanes SC 2-1 St. John's Sports Club
- 2018 - N/A (not held)
- 2019 - Hard Rock FC 3-2 Hurricanes SC
