= Anthony Modeste (Grenadian footballer) =

Grenadian footballer (born 1975)

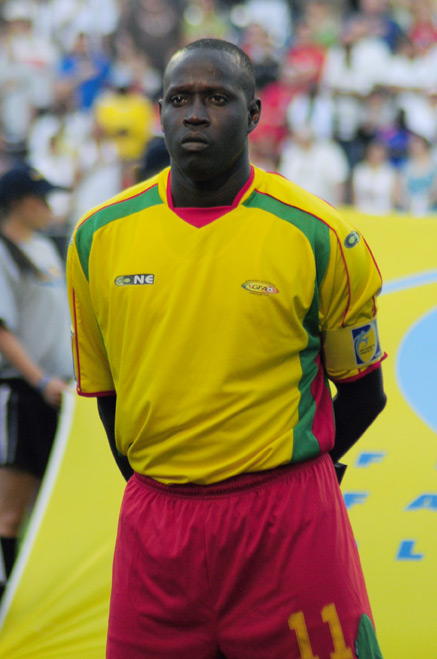
- Modeste, lining up with Grenada in 2009

Personal information
- Full name: Anthony Benedict Modeste
- Date of birth: August 30, 1975 (age 51)
- Place of birth: St. George's, Grenada
- Height: 6 ft 1 in (1.85 m)
- Position: Defender

Team information
- Current team: Camerhogne (manager)

Senior career*
Years	Team	Apps	(Gls)
1995–2002	Queens Park Rangers SC		
2002–2011	Portmore United		
2011–2015	GBSS Demerara Mutual		
2016	Queens Park Rangers SC		
2017–2019	Camerhogne		

International career^{‡}
- Grenada U15
- Grenada U20
- Grenada U23
1996–2011	Grenada	67	(13)

Managerial career
- 2007–2008: Grenada
- St. George Royal Cannons
- Camerhogne
- 2022–2023: Grenada (interim)
- 2025–2026: Grenada
Medal record
Men's football
Representing Grenada
Caribbean Cup
Runner-up	2008 Jamaica
- * Club domestic league appearances and goals as of 25 December 2021 ‡ National team caps and goals as of 25 December 2021

Anthony Benedict Modeste (born 30 August 1975) is a retired Grenadian football player who represented the Grenada national football team, currently manager of Grenada.

== Club career ==
Educated at Grenada Boys' Secondary School, Modeste began his career at Grenadian club Queens Park Rangers SC. After seven years at the club, Modeste moved to Jamaica, signing for Hazard United in 2002. In his first season at Hazard United, Modeste won the 2002–03 National Premier League and JFF Champions Cup, scoring five league goals in the process, as Hazard United relocated from May Pen to Portmore, renaming to Portmore United in 2003. In 2005, Modeste helped Portmore complete another double. In 2007, Portmore won another JFF Champions Cup, winning the league the following season. In 2011, Modeste returned to Grenada, signing for GBSS Demerara Mutual. After five seasons at the club, Modeste returned to Queens Park Rangers for a single season, before joining Camerhogne in 2017. Modeste retired at the club in 2019.

== International career ==
After representing Grenada at under-15, under-20 and under-23 level, Modeste made his debut for Grenada's senior team on 29 March 1996, picking up a yellow card in a 2–1 win against Guyana. In total, Modeste scored 13 times for Grenada, including a four-goal haul against Dominica on 12 March 2001.

=== International goals ===
Scores and results list Grenada's goal tally first.

#	Date	Venue	Opponent	Score	Result	Competition
1	10 July 1997	Stade de Rivière des Pères, Basse-Terre, Guadeloupe	Saint Kitts and Nevis	1–0	2–1	1997 Caribbean Cup
2	15 April 1998	Antigua Recreation Ground, St. John's, Antigua and Barbuda	Anguilla	2–0	14–1	1998 Caribbean Cup qualification
3	5 March 2000	Barbados National Stadium, Bridgetown, Barbados	Barbados	2–1	2–2	2002 FIFA World Cup qualification
4	5 March 2000	Barbados National Stadium, Bridgetown, Barbados	Barbados	2–2	2–2	2002 FIFA World Cup qualification
5	12 March 2001	Grenada National Stadium, St. George's, Grenada	Dominica		8–3	2001 Windward Islands Tournament
6	12 March 2001	Grenada National Stadium, St. George's, Grenada	Dominica		8–3	2001 Windward Islands Tournament
7	12 March 2001	Grenada National Stadium, St. George's, Grenada	Dominica		8–3	2001 Windward Islands Tournament
8	12 March 2001	Grenada National Stadium, St. George's, Grenada	Dominica		8–3	2001 Windward Islands Tournament
9	14 March 2001	Grenada National Stadium, St. George's, Grenada	Saint Lucia		4–3	2001 Windward Islands Tournament
10	11 January 2002	Tanteen Recreation Ground, St. George's, Grenada	Trinidad and Tobago	2–1	2–3	Friendly
11	28 February 2004	Grenada National Stadium, St. George's, Grenada	Guyana	4–0	5–0	2006 FIFA World Cup qualification
12	20 November 2004	Gouyave, Grenada	Saint Vincent and the Grenadines	1–0	3–2	Friendly
13	29 July 2008	Ergilio Hato Stadium, Willemstad, Curaçao	Aruba	2–1	3–1	2008 Caribbean Cup qualification

== Managerial career ==
In 2007, Modeste was appointed manager of Grenada. During the 2009 CONCACAF Gold Cup, whilst captain of the nation, Modeste took up a player-coach role in the Grenada squad. Modeste later managed St. George Royal Cannons and Camerhogne.

In 2022, he was appointed interim manager of the Grenada national team, reverting to his role of assistant manager following the appointment of Terry Connor in May 2023.

== Honours ==
Grenada

- Caribbean Cup: runner-up 2008
