= Jamal Charles (footballer) =

Grenadian footballer (born 1995)

Personal information
- Full name: Jamal Ray Charles
- Date of birth: 24 November 1995 (age 30)
- Place of birth: Gouyave, Grenada
- Height: 1.88 m (6 ft 2 in)
- Position: Midfielder

Team information
- Current team: St. David's FC
- Number: 23

Youth career
- St Andrew's

Senior career*
Years	Team	Apps	(Gls)
2015	Paradise		
2015–2017	W Connection		(11)
2017–2019	Vida	31	(14)
2018	→ Real Monarchs (loan)	3	(0)
2019–2021	Real España	6	(1)
2020–2021	→ Real Sociedad (loan)	25	(8)
2021–2022	Paradise	17	(9)
2022–2024	Real Sociedad	31	(6)
2024–	St. David's FC		

International career^{‡}
2014	Grenada U20	2	(2)
2015–	Grenada	40	(17)
- * Club domestic league appearances and goals as of 29 July 2025 ‡ National team caps and goals as of 01:33, 29 July 2025 (UTC)

Jamal Ray Charles (born 24 November 1995) is a Grenadian footballer who plays as a midfielder for St. David's FC and the Grenada national football team.

== Early life ==
Jamal Ray Charles is the son of Janice Charles and Raphael "Ray" Charles, a former footballer. As a child he attended the Belair Government School in St. Andrew's, which he represented at Primary School level competitions. At the age of 12 he entered the St. Andrew's Anglican Secondary School and was selected by coach Michael "Niko" Felix to represent the school. He played during his entire six years at that institution.

== Career ==
=== Club ===
In July 2019 Charles signed with Liga Nacional club Real España. In December 2020 he was loaned to fellow Liga side Real Sociedad.

In May 2021 Charles returned to Grenada and joined local side Paradise.

=== International ===
Charles represented Grenada at U20 level, during 2015 CONCACAF U-20 Championship qualifying and scored 2 goals against Dominica.

Charles was first selected to represent Grenada during the 2015 Windward Islands Tournament in Saint Lucia. He made an immediate impact, scoring a brace against hosts St Lucia. Charles would score another important goal for Grenada during second round qualifying for the 2018 FIFA World Cup when he scored the winning aggregate goal against Puerto Rico in a 2–0 win to send them through to the Third round.

=== International goals ===
As of match played 24 March 2023. Grenada score listed first, score column indicates score after each Charles goal.

International goals by date, venue, cap, opponent, score, result and competition
No.	Date	Venue	Cap	Opponent	Score	Result	Competition
1	16 May 2015	Philip Marcellin Grounds, Vieux-Fort, Saint Lucia	2	Saint Lucia	1–0	2–0	Friendly
2	16 May 2015	Philip Marcellin Grounds, Vieux-Fort, Saint Lucia	2	Saint Lucia	2–0	2–0	Friendly
3	16 June 2015	Grenada National Stadium, St. George's, Grenada	3	Puerto Rico	2–0	2–0	2018 FIFA World Cup qualification
4	19 March 2016	Grenada National Stadium, St. George's, Grenada	6	Trinidad and Tobago	1–1	2–2	Friendly
5	22 March 2016	Grenada National Stadium, St. George's, Grenada	7	Sint Maarten	2–0	5–0	2017 Caribbean Cup qualification
6	7 June 2016	Sir Vivian Richards Stadium, Antigua, Antigua and Barbuda	9	Antigua and Barbuda	1–2	1–5	2017 Caribbean Cup qualification
7	16 November 2018	Kirani James Athletic Stadium, St. George's, Grenada	15	Saint Martin	1–0	5–2	2019–20 CONCACAF Nations League qualification
8	16 November 2018	Kirani James Athletic Stadium, St. George's, Grenada	15	Saint Martin	2–0	5–2	2019–20 CONCACAF Nations League qualification
9	5 September 2019	Kirani James Athletic Stadium, St. George's, Grenada	17	Saint Kitts and Nevis	2–1	2–1	2019–20 CONCACAF Nations League B
10	7 June 2016	Isidoro Beaton Stadium, Belmopan, Belize	18	Belize	2–1	2–1	2019–20 CONCACAF Nations League B
11	13 October 2019	Kirani James Athletic Stadium, St. George's, Grenada	20	French Guiana	1–0	1–0	2019–20 CONCACAF Nations League B
12	17 November 2019	Kirani James Athletic Stadium, St. George's, Grenada	22	Belize	1–0	3–2	2019–20 CONCACAF Nations League B
13	17 November 2019	Kirani James Athletic Stadium, St. George's, Grenada	22	Belize	2–2	3–2	2019–20 CONCACAF Nations League B
14	17 November 2019	Kirani James Athletic Stadium, St. George's, Grenada	22	Belize	3–2	3–2	2019–20 CONCACAF Nations League B
15	7 June 2022	Kirani James Athletic Stadium, St. George's, Grenada	30	El Salvador	2–1	2–2	2022–23 CONCACAF Nations League A
16	22 February 2023	Fond Playing Field, Sauteurs, Grenada	32	Barbados	1–1	1–1	Friendly
17	26 February 2023	Kirani James Athletic Stadium, St. George's, Grenada	34	Barbados	1–1	2–2	Friendly
