= Grenada at the CONCACAF Gold Cup =

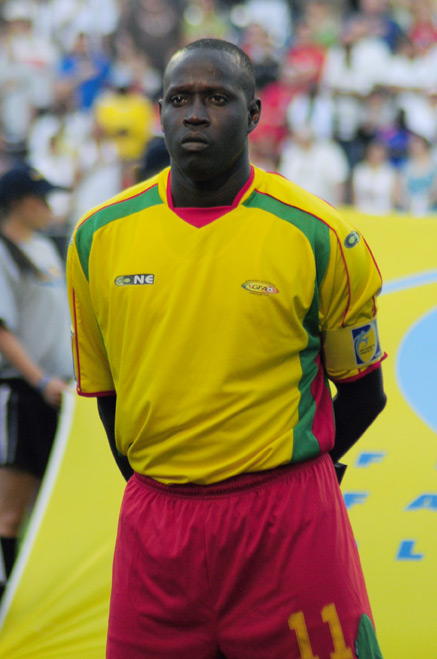
Defender Anthony Modeste played in all six Grenadian Gold Cup matches and was team captain in 2011.

The CONCACAF Gold Cup is North America's major tournament in senior men's football and determines the continental champion. Until 1989, the tournament was known as CONCACAF Championship. It is currently held every two years. From 1996 to 2005, nations from other confederations have regularly joined the tournament as invitees. In earlier editions, the continental championship was held in different countries, but since the inception of the Gold Cup in 1991, the United States are constant hosts or co-hosts.

From 1973 to 1989, the tournament doubled as the confederation's World Cup qualification. CONCACAF's representative team at the FIFA Confederations Cup was decided by a play-off between the winners of the last two tournament editions in 2015 via the CONCACAF Cup, but was then discontinued along with the Confederations Cup.

Since the inaugural tournament in 1963, the Gold Cup was held 28 times and has been won by seven different nations, most often by Mexico (13 titles).

Grenada became a CONCACAF member in 1978 and has since regularly entered the continental championships. They qualified for the final tournament two times, twice in a row in 2009 and 2011. They lost all six matches scoring only one goal, and are ranking last in the all-time table.

== Overall record ==
CONCACAF Championship
| Year | Result | Position | Pld | W | D | L | GF | GA |
|---|---|---|---|---|---|---|---|---|
| (Honduras) 1981 | Did not qualify | | | | | | | |
| 1985 | Withdrew | | | | | | | |
| 1989 | Did not enter | | | | | | | |
CONCACAF Gold Cup
| (United States) 1991 | Did not enter | | | | | | | |
| (Mexico) (United States) 1993 | Did not qualify | | | | | | | |
| (United States) 1996 | Did not qualify | | | | | | | |
| (United States) 1998 | Did not qualify | | | | | | | |
| (United States) 2000 | Did not qualify | | | | | | | |
| (United States) 2002 | Did not qualify | | | | | | | |
| (Mexico) (United States) 2003 | Did not qualify | | | | | | | |
| (United States) 2005 | Did not qualify | | | | | | | |
| (United States) 2007 | Did not qualify | | | | | | | |
| (United States) 2009 | Group stage | 12th | 3 | 0 | 0 | 3 | 0 | 10 |
| (United States) 2011 | Group stage | 11th | 3 | 0 | 0 | 3 | 1 | 15 |
| (United States) 2013 | Did not qualify | | | | | | | |
| (Canada) (United States) 2015 | Did not qualify | | | | | | | |
| (United States) 2017 | Did not qualify | | | | | | | |
| (United States) (Costa Rica) (Jamaica) 2019 | Did not qualify | | | | | | | |
| (United States) 2021 | Group stage | 16th | 3 | 0 | 0 | 3 | 1 | 11 |
| (Canada) (United States) 2023 | Did not qualify | | | | | | | |
| (Canada) (United States) 2025 | Did not qualify | | | | | | | |
| Total | Group stage | 3/28 | 9 | 0 | 0 | 9 | 2 | 36 |

== Match overview ==
| Tournament | Round | Opponent | Score | Venue |
|---|---|---|---|---|
| (United States) 2009 | Group stage | United States | 0–4 | Seattle |
| (United States) 2009 | Group stage | Haiti | 0–2 | Washington, D.C. |
| (United States) 2009 | Group stage | Honduras | 0–4 | Foxboro |
| (United States) 2011 | Group stage | Jamaica | 0–4 | Carson |
| (United States) 2011 | Group stage | Honduras | 1–7 | Miami |
| (United States) 2011 | Group stage | Guatemala | 0–4 | Harrison |
| (United States) 2021 | Group stage | Honduras | 0–4 | Houston |
| (United States) 2021 | Group stage | Qatar | 0–4 | Houston |
| (United States) 2021 | Group stage | Panama | 1–3 | Orlando |

== Record by opponent ==
CONCACAF Championship/Gold Cup matches (by team)
| Opponent | W | D | L | Pld | GF | GA |
|---|---|---|---|---|---|---|
| Guatemala | 0 | 0 | 1 | 1 | 0 | 4 |
| Haiti | 0 | 0 | 1 | 1 | 0 | 2 |
| Honduras | 0 | 0 | 3 | 3 | 1 | 15 |
| Jamaica | 0 | 0 | 1 | 1 | 0 | 4 |
| Panama | 0 | 0 | 1 | 1 | 1 | 3 |
| Qatar | 0 | 0 | 1 | 1 | 0 | 4 |
| United States | 0 | 0 | 1 | 1 | 0 | 4 |

== Record players ==
Anthony Modeste was the only player who was fielded in all of Grenada's first six Gold Cup matches.

| Rank | Player | Matches | Gold Cups |
|---|---|---|---|
| 1 | Anthony Modeste | 6 | 2009 and 2011 |
| 2 | Ricky Charles | 5 | 2009 and 2011 |
| 2 | Delroy Facey | 5 | 2009 and 2011 |
| 2 | Marcus Julien | 5 | 2009 and 2011 |
| 2 | Shane Rennie | 5 | 2009 and 2011 |
| 6 | Cassim Langaigne | 4 | 2009 and 2011 |
| 6 | Marc Marshall | 4 | 2009 and 2011 |
| 6 | Patrick Modeste | 4 | 2009 and 2011 |
| 9 | Eighteen players | 3 | Various |

== Goalscorers ==
The only two Grenadian goals at a Gold Cup were scored by Clive Murray and Romar Frank.

| Player | Goals | 2011 | 2021 |
|---|---|---|---|
| Romar Frank | 1 | | 1 |
| Clive Murray | 1 | 1 | |
| Total | 2 | 1 | 1 |
