= Football in Grenada =

The sport of association football in the country of Grenada is run by the Grenada Football Association. The association administers the national football team, as well as the Grenada Premier Division. Cricket is the most popular sport in Grenada, followed by association football.

== Football stadiums ==
Stadium	Capacity	City	Image
Kirani James Athletic Stadium	8,000	St. George's	

== See also ==
- List of football clubs in Grenada
- Lists of stadiums
