= List of football clubs in Grenada =

This is a list of football clubs in Grenada.

- Ball Dogs
- Carib Hurricane FC
- Chantimelle
- Eagles Super Strikers
- Fontenoy United
- GBSS
- Paradise
- Queen's Park Rangers
- South Stars fc
- Willis Youths
