= Romar Frank =

Grenadian footballer

Personal information
- Full name: Romar Matthew Mary Frank
- Date of birth: 28 September 1996 (age 30)
- Place of birth: Willis, Grenada
- Height: 1.62 m (5 ft 4 in)
- Position: Winger

Team information
- Current team: FC Camerhogne

Senior career*
Years	Team	Apps	(Gls)
2015–2017	New Hampshire United		
2017–2018	Combined Northerners		
2017–2019	FC Camerhogne		
2019–2020	All Saints United		
2020–2022	FC Camerhogne		
2022–2023	Leros SC		
2023–	FC Camerhogne		

International career^{‡}
2015–	Grenada	32	(1)
- * Club domestic league appearances and goals as of 15:13, 2 June 2026 (UTC) ‡ National team caps and goals as of 15:13, 2 June 2026 (UTC)

Romar Matthew Mary Frank (born 28 September 1996) is a Grenadian professional footballer who plays as a winger for FC Camerhogne in the Grenada Premier League and the Grenada national team.

== Club career ==
Frank began his career with New Hampshire United, one of three clubs promoted to the Grenada Premier League for the 2015 season, before joining Combined Northerners in the GFA Conference second division in January 2017.

He joined FC Camerhogne in July 2017, the club based in Gouyave that was renamed from Gouyave Football Club that same year. In the 2018–19 GFA Premier League season, Frank scored eight goals in 16 appearances, making him one of the club's most productive players that campaign.

In January 2020, Frank had a brief spell with All Saints United in the Antigua and Barbuda Premier Division before returning to Camerhogne. Between September 2022 and October 2023 he played for Greek club Leros SC, his only stint outside the Caribbean region, before returning to Camerhogne where he has remained a key member of the squad.ef>

== International career ==
Frank made his senior debut for Grenada in 2015 and has gone on to become a long-serving member of the squad, earning 32 caps across the CONCACAF Nations League, CONCACAF Gold Cup, and various international friendlies. He scored Grenada's second-ever goal at the Gold Cup.

Frank was included in Grenada's squad for the 2021 CONCACAF Gold Cup, the country's third-ever appearance in the tournament. Coming on as a substitute in the final group stage match against Panama on 21 July 2021, he scored Grenada's only goal of the tournament — a consolation in a 3–1 defeat. He was also part of the Grenada squad for the 2022 FIFA World Cup qualification campaign and the 2022–23 and 2024–25 CONCACAF Nations League campaigns.
