= Maran, Grenada =

Village in Grenada

Coordinates: 12°10′38″N 61°43′21″W

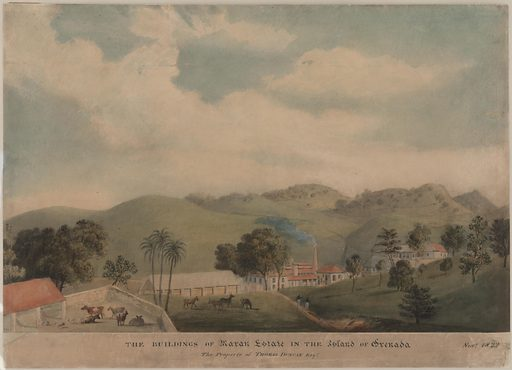
Maran estate in 1822

Maran is a village and former estate in both Saint Mark and Saint John Parish, Grenada. It is close to Gouyave, Grosspoint and Victoria. Gouyave is 0.8 miles away from Maran.

== History ==
The first known owner of Maran estate was Mungo Campbell, who owned it up until his death in 1793, then Maran estate was sold to Thomas Duncan Esquire, who came from Edinburgh. Duncan owned both Maran and Gouyave estates jointly. Thomas Duncan owned the land between 1817 and 1832, and was given £1.08 million (in today's value) for his 332 slaves at Gouyave and Maran estates. The plantation contained dwellings, a sugar mill and stables.

There is a playing field in Maran and nearby is the Mount Edgecombe boutique hotel. Maran river flows through the village.
