= GFA Premier League =

Association football league in Grenada

- Founded: 1983
- First season: 1983
- Country: Grenada
- Confederation: CONCACAF
- Number of clubs: 10
- Level on pyramid: 1
- Relegation to: GFA First Division
- Domestic cup: GFA Super Knockout Cup
- International cup: CFU Club Shield
- Current champions: St.John's SC (2025)
- Most championships: Hurricanes (7 titles)Paradise (7 titles)
- Current: 2025 GFA Premier League

The GFA Premier League is the top football league in Grenada. It was created in 1983 and is headed by the Grenada Football Association. 10 teams participate in this league. The 10th-placed team is relegated to the Grenada First Division, while the 9th-placed team plays a play-off with the 2nd-placed team of the second level. Despite being a league competition in CONCACAF none of the Grenadan teams ever played in CFU Club Championship or CONCACAF Champions' Cup. Some of the matches are played at the 9,000 capacity Grenada National Stadium. League games usually take place in front of dozens of spectators. In 2014, the match between PetroCaribe Queens Park Rangers and Nixon's Electrical Happy Hill FC was the first live broadcast of a Premier Division match.

== Current teams ==
As of 2026

- FC Camerhogne
- Hard Rock
- Honved
- Hurricanes
- Paradise
- SAFL
- Sab Spartans
- St. David's
- St. John's
- QPR

== Former Teams ==
- Eagles Super Strikers
- Mount Rich
- Chantimelle

== 2021–22 stadiums ==
Team	Location	Stadium	Capacity
Eagles Super Strikers	Sauteurs	Fond Recreation Ground	1,000
FC Camerhogne	St. George's	Kirani James Athletic Stadium	8,000
Spartans SC			
Hard Rock FC	Sauteurs	Fond Recreation Ground	1,000
Hurricanes SC	Victoria	Alston George Park	1,000
Mount Rich SC			
Paradise FC International	Paradise	Progress Park	1,000
Queens Park Rangers SC	Gouyave	Cutbert Peters Park	1,000
St. John's SC	Gouyave	Cutbert Peters Park	1,000
Chantimelle Football Club			

== Previous winners ==
- 1983: unknown
- 1984: Queens Park Rangers
- 1985: unknown
- 1986: Carenage
- 1987–93: unknown
- 1994: Queens Park Rangers
- 1995: Queens Park Rangers
- 1996: Barba Super Stars
- 1997: Seven Seas Rock City
- 1998: Fontenoy United
- 1999: SAFL
- 2000: GBSS
- 2001: GBSS
- 2002: Queens Park Rangers
- 2003: Carib Hurricane
- 2004: abandoned
- 2005: Paradise
- 2006: Carib Hurricane
- 2007: Paradise
- 2008: Carib Hurricane
- 2009: abandoned
- 2010: Paradise
- 2011: Hard Rock
- 2012: Hard Rock
- 2013: Hard Rock
- 2014: Paradise
- 2015: Carib Hurricane
- 2016: not finished
- 2017–18: Carib Hurricane
- 2018–19: Paradise
- 2019–20: Hurricanes
- 2020–21: not held due to COVID-19 pandemic
- 2021–22: Hurricanes
- 2022–23: no competition
- 2023–24: Paradise
- 2024–25: Paradise
- 2025–26: St. John's Sports

== Top goalscorers ==
Season	Goalscorer	Club	Goals
2005	(Grenada) Nigel Bishop	GBSS	15
2018-19	(Grenada) Keno Alexander	Hard Rock FC	14
2018-19	(Grenada) Jose McIntosh Jr	Eagles	14
2021-22	(Grenada) Rickell Charles	QPR	16
2023-24	(Grenada) Jamil Rocastle	Hard Rock	16

== Multiple hat-tricks ==
Rank	Country	Player	Hat-tricks
1	(Grenada)	Kriston Julien	5
2	(Grenada)	Deandre Smith	3
2	(Grenada)	Rayel Alexander	3
2	(Grenada)	Rickell Charles	3
2	(Grenada)	Jose Jr McIntosh	3
2	(Grenada)	Jamil Rocastle	3
7	(Grenada)	Keno Alexander	1
7	(Grenada)	Kasey Baptiste	1
7	(Grenada)	Shermon Calliste	1
7	(Grenada)	Jamal Charles	1
7	(Grenada)	Keishon Clarke	1
7	(Grenada)	Chiesa Clyne	1
7	(Grenada)	Joshua Isaac	1
7	(Grenada)	Randell Mark	1
7	(Grenada)	Darrel Phillip	1
7	(Grenada)	Jake Rennie	1
7	(Grenada)	Travis Rennie	1
7	(Grenada)	Kobe Rigby	1
7	(Grenada)	Raheem Stephen	1
7	(Grenada)	Kwazim Theodore	1
7	(Grenada)	Henson Williams	1
7	(Grenada)	Keston Williams	1
