= Grosspoint, Grenada =

Estate and village in Grenada

Grosspoint La Grosse Pointe/Grossepoint
- Estate and Village
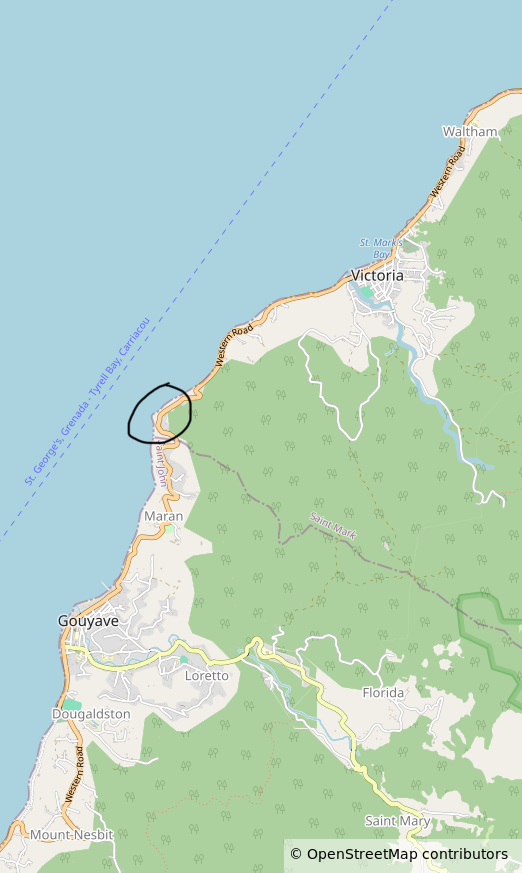
- Grosspoint circled on a map of Saint John and Saint Mark parishes in Grenada.
- Nickname: The Big/large point
- Established: C. 1758

Grosspoint estate (also known as “La Grosse Pointe”, “Grossepoint” and “Gros Point”) is an estate and small village situated in Saint Mark’s parish, Grenada, near to Maran and L’Esperance.

== History ==
The first record of Grosspoint was in 1763, where the site was 40 acres and produced coffee and grassland. It is presumed that the site was first named during the French occupation of the island from 1649 to 1763, due to the name being French in origin. The name means “The big point” in English. It was included in the map of Grenada in the West Indies atlas by Thomas Jeffreys, cartographer for the King (published in 1775) where it is named “La Grosse Pointe”. The estate grew by 1780 to a size of 192 acres and was producing cocoa as well as coffee. It appears the estate had some relationship with the rebels of the Fédon revolt because it was confiscated by the British crown in 1797 and sold/given to a man called David McEwen, who is first mentioned as owning the property in 1817. In the 1800s the estate contained 75–79 enslaved people (male and female). The estate ceased production around 1824 and the slaves were transported to neighbouring Duquesne and Bon Air estates. However by emancipation the estate still existed (now dwindled to the “point” part beside the sea) and was operating as a small farm with a family home, being listed on the 1899 revision of the Department of the War Office‘s map of Grenada.

There was a small house on the cliff’s edge part of the estate which was made in the 1800s and dismantled in the 1990s, it was constructed of Greenheart wood. There are a couple of other buildings on the other side of Palmiste lane, due to the land being a small settlement.

== Geography ==
The current Grosspoint farm/estate is at the edge of the road (Palmiste lane) which heads from Gouyave to Victoria, on a cliff’s edge (known as a “Falez” in the local Grenadian French Creole), It is 85 metres above sea level. The sea from Gouyave to Grosspoint is now a protected fish sanctuary.
