= Paradise FC =

Paradise FC may refer to:

- Paradise FC (Barbados), a football team from Barbados
- Paradise FC International, a football team from Grenada
