= Maran River =

Coordinates: 12°10′N 61°43′W

Location
- Country: Grenada

The Maran River is a river situated in Maran, Saint Mark, Grenada.

== See also ==
- List of rivers of Grenada
