= Kwazim Theodore =

Grenadian footballer

Personal information
- Full name: Kwazim Jude Keron Theodore
- Date of birth: 12 January 1996 (age 30)
- Place of birth: Grand Anse, Grenada
- Height: 1.67 m (5 ft 6 in)
- Position: Midfielder

Team information
- Current team: St. David's

Senior career*
Years	Team	Apps	(Gls)
2015	GBSS		
2016	Queens Park Rangers SC		
2017–2019	Camerhogne	17	(11)
2019–2020	All Saints United		
2020–2021	St. David's		
2021–	Dunstable Town		

International career^{‡}
2017–	Grenada	38	(1)
- * Club domestic league appearances and goals as of 02:49, 20 September 2022 (UTC) ‡ National team caps and goals as of 12:38, 25 March 2023 (UTC)

Kwazim Jude Keron Theodore (born 12 January 1996) is a Grenadian professional footballer who plays as a midfielder for the club Dunstable Town, and the Grenada national team.

== International career ==
Theodore made his debut with the Grenada national team in 2–2 friendly tie with Trinidad and Tobago on 29 April 2017. He was called up to represent Grenada at the 2021 CONCACAF Gold Cup.

== Personal life ==
On 11 April 2017, Theodore was one of 7 persons charged in an incident with the police in Grand Anse, Grenada. He was charged with obscene language, disorderly behavior, assault on police and obstruction, and released on bail.
