= Andrew Munro =

Andrew Munro may refer to:

- Andrew Munro (bishop), Bishop of Ross, Scotland in the 15th century
- Andrew Munro (mathematician) (1869–1935), Scottish fellow, lecturer in mathematics and bursar of Queens' College, Cambridge
- Andrew Munro (footballer) (born 1963), Grenadian international footballer
