= Jeremy Richardson (footballer) =

Grenadian footballer

Personal information
- Date of birth: 3 March 1998 (age 28)
- Position: Goalkeeper

Team information
- Current team: Paradise FC

Senior career*
Years	Team	Apps	(Gls)
2017–	Paradise FC	16	(0)

International career^{‡}
2019–	Grenada	1	(0)
- * Club domestic league appearances and goals as of 20 May 2020 ‡ National team caps and goals as of 20 May 2020

Jeremy Richardson (born 3 March 1998) is a Grenadian footballer who plays as a goalkeeper for Paradise FC and the Grenada national football team.

== Career ==
=== International ===
Richardson made his senior international debut on 8 March 2019, playing the entirety of a 1-1 friendly draw with St. Vincent & the Grenadines.

== Career statistics ==
=== International ===
As of matches played 8 March 2019.

National team	Year	Apps	Goals
Grenada	2019	1	0
Total		1	0
