= Joshua Isaac =

Grenadian footballer

Personal information
- Full name: Joshua Otiamba Isaac
- Date of birth: 28 October 2000 (age 26)
- Place of birth: Grenada
- Height: 1.90 m (6 ft 3 in)
- Position: Forward

Team information
- Current team: Paradise FC International

Senior career*
Years	Team	Apps	(Gls)
2017–	Paradise FC International	46	(28)

International career^{‡}
2018	Grenada U20	2	(0)
2021–	Grenada	11	(6)
- * Club domestic league appearances and goals as of 16:08, 27 February 2023 (UTC) ‡ National team caps and goals as of 13:01, 26 October 2024 (UTC)

Joshua Otiamba Isaac (born 28 October 2000) is a Grenadian footballer who currently plays for GFA Premier League club Paradise FC International and the Grenada national team.

== Club career ==
Isaac had played for Paradise FC International youth since at least 2017. In 2019 he was named the MVP of the football competition at the Windward Islands Secondary School Games in Saint Lucia.

== International career ==
Isaac represented Grenada at the youth level at the 2018 CONCACAF U-20 Championship. He made his senior international debut on 30 March 2021 in a 2022 FIFA World Cup qualification match against the US Virgin Islands. In August 2022 he was called up to the national team again, this time for friendlies in preparation for Grenada's final match of 2022–23 CONCACAF Nations League A in March 2023.

On 1 October 2022 he scored a first-half hattrick against Saint Vincent and the Grenadines in a 5–1 friendly victory. In a three-match series of friendlies between Grenada and Barbados in February 2023, Isaac scored a late goal to ensure a draw. Two days later he scored again to secure another 2–2 result.

=== International goals ===
Scores and results list Grenada's goal tally first.

No.	Date	Venue	Opponent	Score	Result	Competition
1.	24 September 2022	Lauriston Mini Stadium, Carriacou, Grenada	Saint Vincent and the Grenadines	1–2	1–3	Friendly
2.	1 October 2022	Victoria Park, Kingstown, Saint Vincent and the Grenadines	Saint Vincent and the Grenadines	1–1	5–1	Friendly
3.	1 October 2022	Victoria Park, Kingstown, Saint Vincent and the Grenadines	Saint Vincent and the Grenadines	2–1	5–1	Friendly
4.	1 October 2022	Victoria Park, Kingstown, Saint Vincent and the Grenadines	Saint Vincent and the Grenadines	3–1	5–1	Friendly
5.	24 February 2023	Kirani James Athletic Stadium, St. George's, Grenada	Barbados	2–2	2–2	Friendly
6.	26 February 2023	Kirani James Athletic Stadium, St. George's, Grenada	Barbados	2–1	2–2	Friendly
