= 2014 GFA Premier Division =

In the 2014 season the GFA Premier Division, the top football league in Grenada, was won by the ASOMS Paradise team.

== Table ==
1.Paradise                      18  14  1  3  49-15  43  Champions
2.Carib Hurricane               18   9  6  3  25-19  33
3.GBSS                          18   9  2  7  28-23  29
4.Hard Rock                     18   8  3  7  29-21  27
5.Queens Park Rangers           18   8  2  8  31-29  26
6.St. John's Sports             18   8  2  8  29-33  26
7.Fontenoy United               18   8  1  9  23-29  25
8.Mount Rich                    18   7  3  8  30-34  24
- - - - - - - - - - - - - - - - - - - - - - - - - - - -
9.Happy Hill                    18   6  4  8  20-19  22  Relegation Playoff
-------------------------------------------------------
10.Five Stars                   18   0  2 16  18-60   2  Relegated
