= Progress Park =

Cricket and football ground in Grenville, Grenada

- Interactive map of Progress Park

Ground information
- Location: Grenville, Grenada
- Country: Grenada
- Coordinates: 12.1328°N 61.6202°W
- Capacity: 1,000

International information
- First WT20I: 6 September 2011: West Indies v Pakistan
- Last WT20I: 7 September 2011: West Indies v Pakistan

Team information
Windward Islands	(2008/09)
- As of 21 April 2022; Source: Ground profile

Progress Park is a cricket and football ground in Grenville, Grenada.

== History ==
The Park hosted its first representative first-class cricket match in the 2008–09 Regional Four Day Competition when the Windward Islands played Barbados. The following season the Park hosted a neutral first-class fixture between Jamaica and Trinidad and Tobago. The West Indies A cricket team played two List A one-day matches there in November 2010, against a touring Pakistan A side, while in the same year West Indies A also hosted the touring Zimbabweans at the Park for a Twenty20 match, which West Indies A won by 4 wickets due to an unbeaten 60 from Imran Khan. In September 2011, the Park played host to two Women's Twenty20 Internationals between West Indies women and Pakistan women. Prior to 2009, there were discussions from the Grenadan Government to rename Progress Park in honour of the late politician Ben Jones.

As a football venue, Progress Park has played host to two international friendly matches for the Grenada national football team, one in 2010 against Bermuda and another in 2017 against Martinique; both matches ended 2–2. The Park is the home ground of Paradise FC International, who play in the GFA Premier League.

== Records ==
=== First-class ===
- Highest team total: 395 for 8 declared by Barbados v Windward Islands, 2008–09
- Lowest team total: 137 all out by Windward Islands v Barbados, as above
- Highest individual innings: 109 by Brenton Parchment for Jamaica v Trinidad and Tobago, as above
- Best bowling in an innings: 7–124 by Imran Khan for Trinidad and Tobago v Jamaica, as above
- Best bowling in a match: 7–91 by Odean Brown, for Jamaica v Trinidad and Tobago, as above

=== List A ===
- Highest team total: 172 all out (44.1 overs) by Pakistan A v West Indies A, 2010–11 (match 1)
- Lowest team total: 101 all out (31.4 overs) by West Indies A v Pakistan A, 2010–11 (match 1)
- Highest individual innings: 70 not out by Aamer Sajjad for West Indies A v Pakistan A, 2010–11 (match 2)
- Best bowling in an innings: 4–22 by Zulfiqar Babar for Pakistan A v West Indies A, 2010–11 (match 1)

== See also ==
- List of cricket grounds in the West Indies
