= Jorge Añón =

Uruguayan football manager (born 1961)

Personal information
- Full name: Jorge Washington Añón De León
- Date of birth: 14 February 1961 (age 65)

Senior career*
Years	Team	Apps	(Gls)
- Athletic Club Cerro
- Sport Club Parque Del Plata
- Independiente Santa Fe
- Athletic Club Basañez

Managerial career
- 1998: Club Deportivo Parque del Plata
- 2009: FK Baník Most
- 2009: Vanuatu
- 2010–2011: FK Baník Most
- 2015: Grenada
- * Club domestic league appearances and goals

Jorge Washington Añón de León is a Uruguayan football manager.

He was appointed as head coach of the Grenada national football team in April 2015.

Añón represented Uruguay at the 1979 South American U-20 Championship which they won qualifying for the 1979 FIFA World Youth Championship.
