= Tanteen Recreation Ground =

Cricket and football ground in St George's, Grenada

Ground information
- Location: St George's, Grenada
- Coordinates: 12.0485°N 61.7476°W
- Establishment: c. 1977
- Capacity: 1,000

Team information
Windward Islands	(1996/97–2006/07)
- As of 21 April 2022; Source: Ground profile

Tanteen Recreation Ground is a cricket and football ground in St. George's, Grenada.

== History ==
The area in which the ground is located was formerly swamp land, which was drained in 1905. The ground has played host to public events, including a speech delivered by then President of Cuba Fidel Castro in August 1998. Representative cricket was first played there in 1997, when the Windward Islands played Guyana in a first-class match in the 1996–97 Red Stripe Cup. A further first-class match was played there in 1998, before a gap of seven years before the next. The ground hosted the Windward Islands in one first-class match in 2005, two in 2006, and one in 2007. In a 2005 match against the Leeward Islands, the Windward Islands Deighton Butler took a hat-trick in the Leeward Islands second innings. The ground has hosted a single List A one-day match in the 2006–07 KFC Cup between the Windward Islands and Guyana, which the Windward Islands won by 6 wickets despite a century by Guyana's Royston Crandon (101). Numerous women's representative matches have also been hosted at the ground.

As a football venue, Tanteen Recreation Ground is the home ground of Grenada Boys' Secondary School FC. It has played host to four international friendly matches for the Grenada national football team.

== Records ==
=== First-class ===
- Highest team total: 446 all out by Windward Islands v Guyana, 1996–97
- Lowest team total: 177 for 9 declared by Windward Islands v Guyana, as above
- Highest individual innings: 218 by Junior Murray for Windward Islands v Guyana, as above
- Best bowling in an innings: 6-105 by Rawl Lewis for Windward Islands v Barbados, 2005–06
- Best bowling in a match: 8-102 by Deighton Butler, for Windward Islands v Leeward Islands, 2004–05

== See also ==
- List of cricket grounds in the West Indies
