= Morne Docteur =

- Village
- Location within Grenada
- Coordinates: 12°06′N 61°45′W
- Country: Grenada
- Parish: Saint George
- Elevation: 276 ft (84 m)
- Time zone: UTC-4

Morne Docteur is a town in Saint George Parish, Grenada. It is located on the western coast of the island.
