= Andrew Munro (footballer) =

Grenadian footballer

Personal information
- Full name: Andrew Munro
- Date of birth: 28 July 1963 (age 63)
- Place of birth: Grenada

International career
Years	Team	Apps	(Gls)
1996	Grenada	?	(?)

Managerial career
- 2015–2017: Grenada
- 2019–2020: Grenada

Andrew Munro is a former Grenadian international football player and head coach of the Grenada national football team.

As a player, he was involved in the 1998 FIFA World Cup qualification campaign.

Munro was placed in charge of the national team for their 2017 Caribbean Cup qualification campaign.
