= Fontenoy United FC =

Association football club in Grenada

Fontenoy United
- Full name: Fontenoy United Football Club
- Nickname: Point
- Ground: Kirani James Athletic Stadium, Gouyave
- Capacity: 8,000
- Chairman: Ashley Folkes
- League: GFA Premier Division
- 2025: 3rd in GFA Premier Division

Fontenoy United F.C. is a Grenadian professional football club from the neighborhood of Fontenoy St. George's, Grenada that plays in the GFA Premier Division.

== Honours ==
- Grenada Premier Division:
  - Champions (1): 1998
