= Grenada national football team =

Men's association football team

Grenada
- Nickname: The Spice Boys
- Association: Grenada Football Association (GFA)
- Confederation: CONCACAF (North America)
- Sub-confederation: CFU (Caribbean)
- Head coach: Anthony Modeste
- Captain: Saydrel Lewis
- Most caps: Cassim Langaigne (72)
- Top scorer: Ricky Charles (37)
- Home stadium: Kirani James Stadium
- FIFA code: GRN
First colours	Second colours

FIFA ranking
- Current: 168 ▲1 (18 November 2026)
- Highest: 88 (July 2009)
- Lowest: 176 (December 2007)

First international
- Grenada 2–1 British Guiana (Grenada; 13 October 1934)

Biggest win
- Grenada 14–1 Anguilla (St. John's, Antigua and Barbuda; 15 April 1998)

Biggest defeat
- Curaçao 10–0 Grenada (Willemstad, Curaçao; 10 September 2018)

CONCACAF Gold Cup
- Appearances: 3 (first in 2009)
- Best result: Group stage (2009, 2011, 2021)
Medal record
Caribbean Cup
Silver medal – second place	1989 Barbados	Team
Silver medal – second place	2008 Jamaica	Team

The Grenada national football team represents Grenada in men's international football, which is governed by the Grenada Football Association founded in 1924. It has been an affiliate member of FIFA since 1978 and an affiliate member of CONCACAF since 1969. Regionally, it is an affiliate member of CFU in the Caribbean Zone.

Grenada has never participated in the FIFA World Cup, but has qualified for the CONCACAF Gold Cup three times, and has also participated twice in League A and twice in League B of the CONCACAF Nations League. Regionally, the team finished as runners-up in the Caribbean Cup twice (1989 and 2008).

== History ==
=== Beginnings and early tournaments (1934–1989) ===
Grenada played its first international match, on 13 October 1934, against British Guiana, which they defeated 2–1. They played British Guiana twice, Barbados and St Kitts and Nevis before the Second World War started in 1939, winning all of those contests.

In 1961, Grenada participated in the Windward Islands Tournament, losing their opening game to Saint Vincent and the Grenadines 6–3, but winning their next two matches against Saint Lucia 4–0 and Dominica 8–1 to win the tournament. Grenada won the tournament again the following year, beating Saint Vincent 2–1 in the final, and for four consecutive years from 1967 to 1970.

Grenada played their first competitive match in the 1979 CFU Championship qualifiers against Trinidad and Tobago, losing 3–1 on aggregate. Grenada entered the 1981 CONCACAF Championship qualification but lost in the preliminary round to Guyana 8–4 over two legs. Their next competitive match came in the 1985 CFU Championship qualifiers, but they lost both matches and failed to progress past the first round. Grenada had more success in the CFU Championship's successor tournament, reaching the 1989 Caribbean Cup final before losing 2–1 to Trinidad and Tobago.

=== Caribbean Cup and qualifiers (1990–2010) ===
Grenada qualified for the 1990 Caribbean Cup but lost again to Trinidad and Tobago, this time 5–0 before drawing with Jamaica 0–0 therefore failing to advance. In the qualifiers for the 1994 Caribbean Cup, Grenada was eliminated by Barbados in an infamous match where Barbados purposefully scored an own-goal in order to force overtime and help them to advance, which they did. Grenada qualified to the 1997 Caribbean Cup, reaching the semi-finals before losing to Saint Kitts and Nevis. Grenada entered the 1998 World Cup qualifiers but after getting through the preliminary round by beating Guyana 8–1 on aggregate, they lost 7–1 over two legs to Haiti.

In the 2002 World Cup qualifiers, Grenada was knocked out by Barbados who won with a tight 5–4 aggregate score. They were luckier four years later in the 2006 World Cup qualifiers, once again eliminating Guyana (8–1 on aggregate) in the first round before falling to the USA who edged them 6–2. Grenada would close this decade with a new World Cup disappointment, in the 2010 World Cup qualifiers, being eliminated by Costa Rica 5–2.

=== Gold Cup ===
Nineteen years after finishing runner-up in the 1989 Caribbean Cup, the Spice Boyz once again reached the final, in the 2008 edition, although they lost to the hosts, Jamaica 2–0. However, this result allowed them to qualify for the 2009 CONCACAF Gold Cup for the first time, however Grenada failed to score a goal in the competition whilst conceding ten times and collecting no points. In the 2010 Caribbean Cup, Grenada reached the semi-finals before again being eliminated by Jamaica though their performance earned them qualification for the 2011 CONCACAF Gold Cup but they again failed to capitalise, losing all three group matches and scoring only a single goal.

=== 2012–present ===
Since 2012, Grenada have not managed to progress to the Caribbean Cup or the CONCACAF Gold Cup. In the 2014 FIFA World Cup qualifiers, they finished bottom of their qualifying group despite being the top seed, then in 2018 World Cup qualification they were eliminated by Haiti in the third round.

In the 2019–20 CONCACAF Nations League qualifying, Grenada suffered its largest ever defeat, losing 10–0 against Curaçao. They'd eventually qualify for League B before earning promotion to League A for the 2022–23 CONCACAF Nations League competition.

== Results and fixtures ==
The following is a list of match results in the last 12 months, as well as any future matches that have been scheduled.

Win Draw Loss Fixture

=== 2025 ===
14 November Friendly	Grenada	4–1	U.S. Virgin Islands	St. George's, Grenada
	Muirhead 11'; Charles-Cook 27', 34'; Douglas 56'	Report	Liburd 71'	Stadium: Kirani James Athletic Stadium

=== 2026 ===
18 January Friendly	Grenada	0–1	Jamaica	St. George's, Grenada
15:00 UTC−4		Report	N. Fuller 81'	Stadium: Kirani James Stadium

27 March 2026 FIFA Series	Rwanda	4–0	Grenada	Kigali, Rwanda
21:00 UTC+2	Leroy-Jacques Mickels 45+2'; J. Kwizera 45+6'; Bizimana 69'; Sahabo 83'	Report		Stadium: Amahoro Stadium; Referee: Haimanot Adane (Ethiopia)

30 March 2026 FIFA Series	Grenada	0–3	Kenya	Kigali, Rwanda
16:00 UTC+2		Report	A. Odhiambo 13'; Ogam 18'; Valcin 81' (o.g.)	Stadium: Amahoro Stadium; Attendance: 31,200; Referee: Ahmed Arajiga (Tanzania)
Note: The third-place match and the final of the Rwanda A section of the 2026 FIFA Series, originally scheduled for 18:00 and 21:00 local time, respectively, were brought forward to 16:00 and 19:30 local time at the request of the participating teams.

16 May Friendly	Grenada	0–5	Republic of Ireland	Murcia, Spain
18:00 UTC+2		Report	Cannon 46', 56'; Moylan 62', 80', 84'	Stadium: Estadio Nueva Condomina; Attendance: 862; Referee: Seth Galia (Gibraltar)

25 September 2026–27 CONCACAF Nations League	Grenada	0–3	Cuba	Basseterre, Saint Kitts and Nevis
17:00 UTC−4		Report	Sandiford 19' (o.g.); Díaz 90+1'; Reinoso 90+4'	Stadium: SKNFA Technical Center; Attendance: 328; Referee: Patrick Sénécharles (Haiti)

28 September 2026–27 CONCACAF Nations League	Saint Kitts and Nevis	3–0	Grenada	Basseterre, Saint Kitts and Nevis
20:00 UTC−4	Williams 11', 17', 76' (pen.)	Report		Stadium: SKNFA Technical Center; Attendance: 633; Referee: Jefferson Escobar (Honduras)

2 October 2026–27 CONCACAF Nations League	Bonaire	2–3	Grenada	Port of Spain, Trinidad and Tobago
20:00 UTC−4	Cicilia 7'; Bostdorp 33'	Report	Hippolyte 50' (pen.); Ettienne 55'; Redhead 69'	Stadium: Hasely Crawford Stadium; Attendance: 116; Referee: Moeth Gaymes (Saint Vincent and the Grenadines)

5 October 2026–27 CONCACAF Nations League	Grenada	1–4	Bonaire	Port of Spain, Trinidad and Tobago
20:00 UTC−4	Ettienne 11'	Report	Martijn 13'; Sonnenschein 59'; Bostdorp 67'; Cicilia 83'	Stadium: Hasely Crawford Stadium; Attendance: 135; Referee: Jorge Leira (Panama)

13 November 2026–27 CONCACAF Nations League	Grenada	3–2	Saint Kitts and Nevis	Havana, Cuba
UTC 19:00	Ettienne 34' Valcin 50' Sylvester 52'	Report	Williams 12', 63'	Stadium: Estadio La Polar; Attendance: ? Referee: Andrew Samuel (Trinidad and Tobago)

16 November 2026 2026–27 CONCACAF Nations League	Cuba	9–0	Grenada	Havana, Cuba
16 November 2026	Nebreda 5' Aguirre 19', 40' Bravo 42' Camejo 49' Reyes 55' Campo 67' Pérez 81' Díaz 88'	Report		Stadium: Estadio La Polar; Attendance: ? Referee: Jorge Leira (Panama) }}

== Coaching staff ==
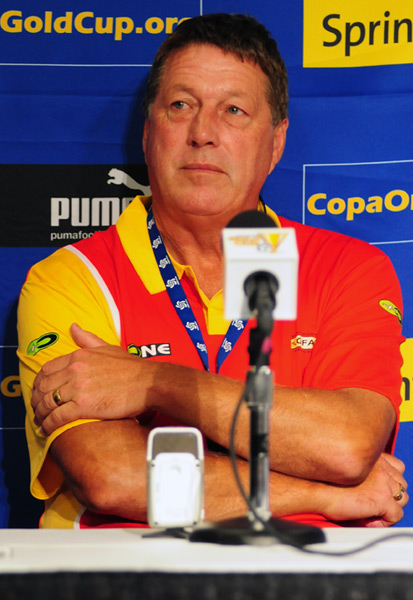
Thomas Frederick Taylor became the manager of the national football team of Grenada in 2009

Position	Name
Technical director	(Grenada) Alister Fleming
Head coach	(Grenada) Anthony Modeste
Assistant coaches	(Grenada) Ryan Cummings (Grenada) Graeme Constance (Grenada) Jamal Trafford
Fitness coaches	(Grenada) Hayden Roberts (Grenada) Luther Jeffords
Physiotherapists	(Grenada) James Neil (Grenada) Denzel Daniels (Grenada) Khalil Stevens
Team doctors	(Grenada) Lawrence Cooper (Grenada) Andrew Sherman
Masseur	(Grenada) Adam Courts
Osteopath	(Grenada) Wesley Lewis
Team nutritionists	(Grenada) Rebecca Pembroke (Grenada) Graham Murray
Team cookers	(Grenada) Timothy Hogg (Grenada) Alvin Marshall (Grenada) Jessica Mitchell (Grenada) LeRoy Hendricks (Grenada) Rashid Goodwin
Team coordinator	(Grenada) Marcellus Henshaw
Technical director	(Grenada) Gary Hudson
Head of delegation	(Grenada) Raymond Bullock

=== Coaching history ===
- (West Germany) Rudi Gutendorf (1976)
- (Argentina) Carlos Cavagnaro (1986–87)
- (Brazil) Carlos Alberto da Luz (2000)
- (Trinidad and Tobago) Franklyn Simpson (2002)
- (Grenada) Alister De Bellotte (2004)
- (Grenada) Anthony Modeste (2007–08)*
- (Grenada) Norris Wilson (2008–09)
- (England) Tommy Taylor (2009–10)
- (Trinidad and Tobago) Franklyn Simpson (2010–11)
- (England) Mike Adams (2011–12)
- (Grenada) Alister De Bellotte (2012)
- (Grenada) Clark John (2013–14)
- (Grenada) Anthony Modeste (2014–15)
- (Uruguay) Jorge Añón (2015)
- (Grenada) Andrew Munro (2016)
- (Grenada) Ashley Folkes (2017–2018)
- (Grenada) Shalrie Joseph (2018–2019)
- (Grenada) Andrew Munro (2019–2020)
- (Canada) Michael Findlay (2021–2022)
- (Grenada) Anthony Modeste (2022–2023)
- (England) Terry Connor (2023–2024)
- (Grenada) Shalrie Joseph (2024)
- (Grenada) Anthony Modeste (2025–present)

*Player-coach

== Players ==
=== Current squad ===
The following players were called up for the 2026–27 CONCACAF Nations League B matches against Cuba, Saint Kitts and Nevis and Bonaire (twice) on 25, 29 September, 3 and October 2026.

Caps and goals correct as of 5 October 2026, after the match against Bonaire.

No.	Pos.	Player	Date of birth (age)	Caps	Goals	Club
1	GK	Jason Belfon	3 July 1990 (age 36)	55	0	(Grenada Football Association) Paradise FC International
12	GK	Chad Phillip	9 August 2000 (age 26)	12	0	(Jamaica Football Federation) Waterhouse
22	GK	Trishwan Thomas	25 January 2003 (age 23)	6	0	(Grenada Football Association) Royal Grenada Police Force
2	DF	Benjamin Ettienne	13 March 2003 (age 23)	30	2	(Grenada Football Association) Queens Park Rangers
3	DF	Jabari De Coteau	22 March 2005 (age 21)	3	0	(United States Soccer Federation) Colorado Springs Switchbacks
5	DF	Kayden Harrack	28 February 2003 (age 23)	23	1	(The Football Association) Dagenham & Redbridge
6	DF	Sawan Mark	11 April 2002 (age 24)	7	0	(Grenada Football Association) St. John's
11	DF	Shavon John-Brown	13 April 1995 (age 31)	49	4	(United States Soccer Federation) Spokane Velocity
13	DF	Greg Sandiford	7 May 2005 (age 21)	8	0	(Irish Football Association) Larne
16	DF	AJ Paterson	31 January 1996 (age 30)	24	4	(United States Soccer Federation) Birmingham Legion
21	DF	Josh Gabriel	30 November 1999 (age 26)	26	0	(Grenada Football Association) St. David's FC
4	MF	Dorrel Pierre	5 May 1999 (age 27)	18	1	(Antigua and Barbuda Football Association) All Saints United
8	MF	Myles Hippolyte	9 November 1994 (age 32)	13	5	(The Football Association) AFC Wimbledon
10	MF	Rickell Charles	1 October 1998 (age 28)	3	0	(Grenada Football Association) Queens Park Rangers
14	MF	Parish Muirhead	26 December 2000 (age 25)	11	0	(The Football Association) Lewes
17	MF	Deon Phillip	30 January 2004 (age 22)	7	0	(Grenada Football Association) Queens Park Rangers
23	MF	Deondre Smith	23 April 2005 (age 21)	2	0	(Grenada Football Association) Queens Park Rangers
	MF	Corey Edwards	9 July 2007 (age 19)	0	0	(The Football Association) Stockport County
7	FW	Darius Johnson	15 March 2000 (age 26)	16	2	(United States Soccer Federation) San Jose Earthquakes
9	FW	Lucas Akins	25 February 1989 (age 37)	11	2	(The Football Association) Mansfield Town
15	FW	Jermaine Francis	15 March 2002 (age 24)	23	3	(The Football Association) Sutton United
18	FW	Jamal Gittens	5 November 2000 (age 26)	8	0	(Grenada Football Association) St. David's FC
19	FW	Joshua Isaac	28 October 2000 (age 26)	21	8	(Grenada Football Association) Paradise FC International
20	FW	Caleb Redhead	21 November 2006 (age 19)	3	1	(The Football Association) Millwall

=== Recent call-ups ===
The following players have been called up within the last 12 months.

Pos.	Player	Date of birth (age)	Caps	Goals	Club	Latest call-up
GK	Shaquille Charles	16 April 2004 (age 22)	1	0	(Grenada) St. John's	v. Republic of Ireland, 16 May 2026
GK	Jeremy Richardson	3 March 1998 (age 28)	5	0	(Grenada) Paradise FC International	v. Jamaica, 18 January 2026
DF	Kane Vincent-Young	15 March 1996 (age 30)	6	0	(England) Colchester United	v. Republic of Ireland, 16 May 2026
DF	Jacob Bedeau	24 December 1999 (age 26)	4	0	(England) Notts County	v. Republic of Ireland, 16 May 2026
DF	Joshua Lett	9 September 2004 (age 22)	2	0	(England) Sunderland	v. Republic of Ireland, 16 May 2026
DF	Kimron Marshall	5 November 1993 (age 33)	17	0	(Grenada) Camerhogne	v. Kenya, 30 March 2026
DF	Trevon Williams	11 December 1994 (age 31)	15	2	(Grenada) Queens Park Rangers	v. Kenya, 30 March 2026
DF	Aaron Pierre	17 February 1993 (age 33)	21	0	(England) Eastleigh	v. Jamaica, 18 January 2026
DF	Anthony Charles	4 April 2006 (age 20)	0	0	(Grenada) Queens Park Rangers	v. Jamaica, 18 January 2026
DF	Jonathan Williams	30 December 1994 (age 31)	2	0	(Grenada) FC Camerhogne	v. U.S. Virgin Islands, 14 November 2025
MF	Romar Frank	28 September 1996 (age 30)	32	1	(Grenada) Camerhogne	v. Republic of Ireland, 16 May 2026
MF	Ashley Charles	15 May 1999 (age 27)	8	0	(England) Bromley	v. Republic of Ireland, 16 May 2026
MF	Keston Williams	22 February 2004 (age 22)	4	1	(Grenada) Paradise FC International	v. Republic of Ireland, 16 May 2026
MF	Keishon Clarke	27 July 2004 (age 22)	7	0	(United States) West Virginia Tech	v. Kenya, 30 March 2026
MF	Ethan Telesford	13 November 2003 (age 23)	11	0	(Grenada) FC Camerhogne	v. Jamaica, 18 January 2026
MF	E-Jay George	23 February 2007 (age 19)	2	0	(Grenada) FC Camerhogne	v. U.S. Virgin Islands, 14 November 2025
MF	Hensen William	9 November 2000 (age 26)	1	0	(Grenada) Paradise	v. U.S. Virgin Islands, 14 November 2025
FW	Deanroy Phillip	19 February 2003 (age 23)	7	2	(United States) Otero College	v. Republic of Ireland, 16 May 2026
FW	Vijay Valcin	20 July 2005 (age 21)	6	0	(Grenada) St. John's SC	v. Republic of Ireland, 16 May 2026
FW	Raheem Raeburn	15 February 2008 (age 18)	4	0	(Grenada) North Stars SC	v. Republic of Ireland, 16 May 2026
FW	Narshon Sylvester	15 January 2007 (age 19)	2	0	(Grenada) Hurricanes	v. Republic of Ireland, 16 May 2026
FW	D'Margio Wright-Phillips	24 September 2001 (age 25)	1	0	(Belgium) Beerschot	v. Kenya, 30 March 2026
FW	Ellis Lehane	2 October 2006 (age 20)	0	0	(England) Tottenham Hotspur	v. Kenya, 30 March 2026
FW	Zade Douglas	28 July 2006 (age 20)	5	1	(United States) Dodge City Conquistadors	v. Jamaica, 18 January 2026
FW	Regan Charles-Cook	14 February 1997 (age 29)	13	4	(Scotland) Motherwell	v. U.S. Virgin Islands, 14 November 2025

== Records ==
As of 19 July 2026
Players in bold still active with Grenada.

=== Most appearances ===
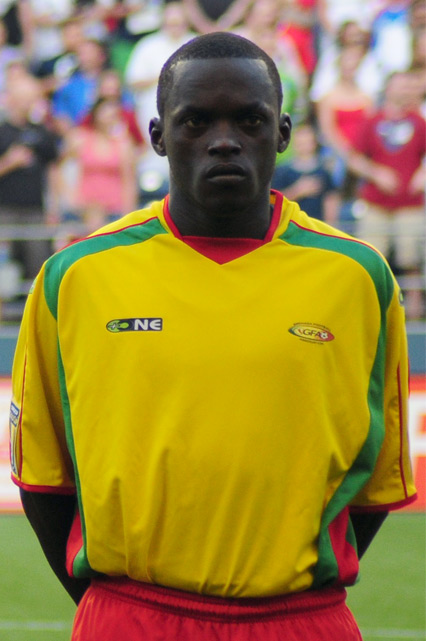
Cassim Langaigne is Grenada's most capped player with 67 official FIFA appearances.

Rank	Player	Caps	Goals	Period
1	Cassim Langaigne	67	6	2004–2016
2	Ricky Charles	65	32	1995–2011
3	Anthony Modeste	63	13	1996–2011
4	Patrick Modeste	50	5	1996–2015
5	**Jason Belfon**	49	0	2013–present
6	Marc Marshall	44	0	2004–2015
7	Kithson Bain	42	13	2002–2015
8	**Shavon John-Brown**	41	3	2012–present
9	**Kwazim Theodore**	38	0	2017–present
10	**Saydrel Lewis**	36	8	2017–present

=== Top goalscorers ===
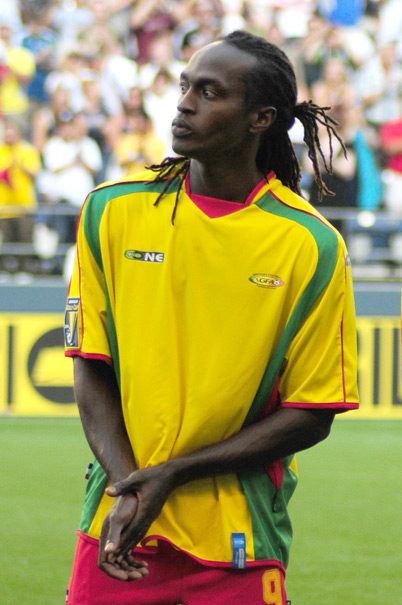
Ricky Charles is Grenada's top scorer with 32 goals in official FIFA matches.

Rank	Player	Goals	Caps	Ratio	Period
1	Ricky Charles	32	65	0.49	1995–2011
2	**Jamal Charles**	13	33	0.39	2015–present
2	Kithson Bain	13	42	0.31	2002–2015
2	Anthony Modeste	13	63	0.21	1996–2011
5	Denis Rennie	9	26	0.35	1999–2008
6	**Saydrel Lewis**	8	36	0.22	2017–present
7	Keith Fletcher	7	6	1.17	1990–2000
8	**Myles Hippolyte**	6	9	0.67	2023–present
8	Denron Frederick	6	17	0.35	2009–2018
8	**Joshua Isaac**	6	17	0.35	2021–present
8	Clive Murray	6	19	0.32	2011–2015
8	Jake Rennie	6	29	0.21	2008–2017
8	Cassim Langaigne	6	67	0.09	2004–2016

== Competitive record ==
=== FIFA World Cup ===
FIFA World Cup									FIFA World Cup qualification					
Year	Round	Position	Pld	W	D*	L	GF	GA	Pld	W	D	L	GF	GA
1930 to 1978	Not a FIFA member								Not a FIFA member					
(Spain) 1982	Did not qualify								2	0	0	2	4	8
(Mexico) 1986	Withdrew								Withdrew					
1990 and 1994	Did not enter								Declined participation					
(France) 1998	Did not qualify								4	2	0	2	9	8
(South Korea) (Japan) 2002	Did not qualify								2	0	1	1	4	5
(Germany) 2006	Did not qualify								4	2	0	2	10	7
(South Africa) 2010	Did not qualify								3	1	1	1	12	5
(Brazil) 2014	Did not qualify								6	1	1	4	7	14
(Russia) 2018	Did not qualify								4	1	0	3	3	7
(Qatar) 2022	Did not qualify								4	1	0	3	2	5
(Canada) (Mexico) (United States) 2026	Did not qualify								4	2	1	1	11	7
(Morocco) (Portugal) (Spain) 2030	To be determined								To be determined					
(Saudi Arabia) 2034	To be determined								To be determined					
Total	-	0/11	-	-	-	-	-	-	33	10	4	19	62	66

*Draws include knockout matches decided via penalty shoot-out.

=== CONCACAF Championship & Gold Cup ===
CONCACAF Championship & Gold Cup record
Year	Round	Position	Pld	W	D*	L	GF	GA
(El Salvador) 1963 to (Haiti) 1973	Part of United Kingdom							
(Mexico) 1977	Did not enter							
(Honduras) 1981	Did not qualify							
1985	Withdrew							
1989	Did not enter							
(United States) 1991	Did not enter							
(Mexico) (United States) 1993	Did not qualify							
(United States) 1996	Did not qualify							
(United States) 1998	Did not qualify							
(United States) 2000	Did not qualify							
(United States) 2002	Did not qualify							
(Mexico) (United States) 2003	Did not qualify							
(United States) 2005	Did not qualify							
(United States) 2007	Did not qualify							
(United States) 2009	Group stage	12th	3	0	0	3	0	10
(United States) 2011	Group stage	11th	3	0	0	3	1	15
(United States) 2013	Did not qualify							
(Canada) (United States) 2015	Did not qualify							
(United States) 2017	Did not qualify							
(Costa Rica) (Jamaica) (United States) 2019	Did not qualify							
(United States) 2021	Group stage	16th	3	0	0	3	1	11
(Canada) (United States) 2023	Did not qualify							
(Canada) (United States) 2025	Did not qualify							
Total	Group stage	3/28	9	0	0	9	2	36

=== CONCACAF Nations League ===
CONCACAF Nations League record
League										Finals								
Season	Division	Group	Pld	W	D	L	GF	GA	P/R	Finals	Result	Pld	W	D	L	GF	GA	Squad
2019–20	B	A	6	4	2	0	8	4	▲	(United States) 2021	Ineligible							
2022–23	A	D	4	0	1	3	4	17	Same position	(United States) 2023	Did not qualify							
2023–24	A	B	4	0	1	3	2	13	▼	(United States) 2024	Did not qualify							
2024–25	B	B	6	2	1	3	7	6	Same position	(United States) 2025	Ineligible							
Total	—	—	20	6	5	9	21	40	—	Total	0 Titles	—	—	—	—	—	—	—

=== CFU Caribbean Cup ===
CFU Championship & Caribbean Cup record									Qualification record					
Year	Round	Position	Pld	W	D*	L	GF	GA	Pld	W	D*	L	GF	GA
(Trinidad and Tobago) 1978	Did not enter								Did not enter					
(Suriname) 1979	Did not qualify								2	0	0	2	1	3
(Puerto Rico) 1981	Did not enter								Did not enter					
(French Guiana) 1983	Did not enter								Did not enter					
(Barbados) 1985	Did not qualify								2	0	0	2	1	8
(Martinique) 1988	Did not enter								Did not enter					
(Barbados) 1989	Runners-up	2nd	3	1	1	1	4	3	4	4	0	0	13	1
(Trinidad and Tobago) 1990	Group Stage	5th	2	0	1	1	0	5	3	1	2	0	4	2
(Jamaica) 1991	Did not enter								Did not enter					
(Trinidad and Tobago) 1992	Did not qualify								3	0	2	1	1	2
(Jamaica) 1993	Did not qualify								3	1	0	2	6	7
(Trinidad and Tobago) 1994	Did not qualify								2	1	0	1	4	4
(Cayman Islands) (Jamaica) 1995	Did not qualify								2	1	0	1	2	4
(Trinidad and Tobago) 1996	Did not qualify								3	1	1	1	3	4
(Antigua and Barbuda) (Saint Kitts and Nevis) 1997	Fourth place	4th	4	1	1	2	6	8	2	1	1	0	6	2
(Trinidad and Tobago) (Jamaica) 1998	Did not qualify								3	2	0	1	17	4
(Trinidad and Tobago) 1999	Group stage	6th	3	1	0	2	3	10	2	1	1	0	3	1
(Trinidad and Tobago) 2001	Did not qualify								3	1	0	2	6	7
(Barbados) 2005	Did not qualify								5	1	1	3	8	10
(Trinidad and Tobago) 2007	Did not qualify								3	0	1	2	1	3
(Jamaica) 2008	Runners-up	2nd	5	2	1	2	8	11	5	2	1	2	10	9
(Martinique) 2010	Fourth place	4th	5	1	2	2	3	4	3	2	0	1	5	4
(Antigua and Barbuda) 2012	Did not qualify								3	1	1	1	3	4
(Jamaica) 2014	Did not qualify								3	0	2	1	4	5
(Martinique) 2017	Did not qualify								4	2	0	2	11	9
Total	Runners-up	2nd	22	6	6	10	24	41	60	22	13	25	109	93

== Honours ==
=== Regional ===
- Caribbean Cup
  - (silver) Runners-up (2): 1989, 2008
