= Eagles Super Strikers FC =

Association football club in Grenada

- Full name: Eagles Super Strikers Football Club
- Nickname: Eagles
- Founded: 1984; 42 years ago
- Ground: Fond Recreation Ground, Sauteurs
- Capacity: 1,000
- Chairman: Herrick Jones
- Manager: Romario Wellers
- League: GFA Premier Division
- 2018: 5th

Eagles Super Strikers FC are a Grenadian football club based in Sauteurs. The club most recently competed in the GFA First Division, and were promoted to the GFA Premier Division, the top-tier of football in Grenada, in 2016. The club's home ground is the Fond Recreation Ground in Sauteurs.
