= FC Camerhogne =

Association football club in Grenada

- Full name: Football Club Camerhogne
- Nickname: FCC
- Founded: 2013; 13 years ago
- Ground: Kirani James Athletic Stadium, St. George's
- Capacity: 8,000
- Chairman: Kembler Hutchinson
- Manager: Waylon Evans
- League: GFA Premier League
- 2025: 5th

Football Club Camerhogne is a Grenadian professional football club based in Gouyave. The club plays in the GFA Premier League, the highest tier of football on the island.

The club was known as Gouyave Football Club until 2017.

== Squad ==
As of 7 March 2020

Note: Flags indicate national team as defined under FIFA eligibility rules; some limited exceptions apply. Players may hold more than one non-FIFA nationality.

No.	Pos.	Nation	Player
—	GK	GRN	Mauritius Winchester
—	DF	GRN	Jake Mallory
—	DF	GRN	Kenneth Branthwaite
—	MF	GRN	Franklin Colgrave
4	MF	GRN	Welliam Pemberton
—	MF	GRN	Isiah Woodson
—	FW	GRN	Iain Bartley
—	FW	GRN	Celestinus Mitchell
