= Victoria, Grenada =

Victoria
- Town
- Location within Grenada
- Coordinates: 12°11′N 61°42′W
- Country: Grenada
- Parish: Saint Mark
- Elevation: 509 ft (155 m)
- Time zone: UTC-4

Victoria is a town and capital of Saint Mark Parish, the smallest parish in Grenada. It has a population of 2256 (2013), and is the fourth largest town in Grenada.

== History ==
The original inhabitants of the region were the Kalinago who left petroglyphs and rock art in Waltham and Dusquesne. The French first arrived in the region of Saint Mark in the 1670s and expelled the Kalinago, they then founded the town of Victoria around 1721, and was designated as a new parish in 1741. The town’s architecture mainly dates from the mid-to-late 1800s, with various churches and estates such as Diamond estate, one of the oldest in the parish.

== Tourist attractions ==
Various attractions near to Victoria include:

- The Molinere underwater sculpture park
- The River Antonine rum distillery
- Belmont estate
- Jouvay Chocolate estate

== Geography ==
Victoria is on the west coast of the island, it is connected by one road to Maran, Grosspoint and Gouyave to the south and Sauteurs to the north.
