= Fond Playing Field =

Football venue in Sauteurs, Grenada

Coordinates: 12.224604°N 61.645984°W

- Interactive map of Fond Playing Field
- Location: Prospect Road, Sauteurs, Grenada
- Owner: Government of Grenada
- Operator: Grenada Football Association
- Capacity: 1,000
- Surface: Grass

Construction
- Renovated: 2013–2016
- Cost: €1.3million (Renovation only)
- General contractors: Patrick Construction & Trucking Services Limited

Tenants
- Grenada national football team Boca Juniors FC; Chantimelle FC; Hard Rock FC; Mount Rich SC

The Fond Playing Field is a football venue in Sauteurs, Saint Patrick Parish, Grenada. Redevelopment, which included increasing spectator seating capacity to 1,000; adding flood lighting; and resurfacing the playing field, was begun in 2013 and completed in 2016 with $1.6 million Euros provided through the FIFA Goal Project. The property is owned by the government of Grenada and leased to the Grenada Football Association. The ground is home to all GFA Premier Division clubs from the parish.
