= Saint Mark Parish, Grenada =

Coordinates: 12°11′N 61°42′W

Saint Mark Parish Paroisse de Saint Mark
- Parish
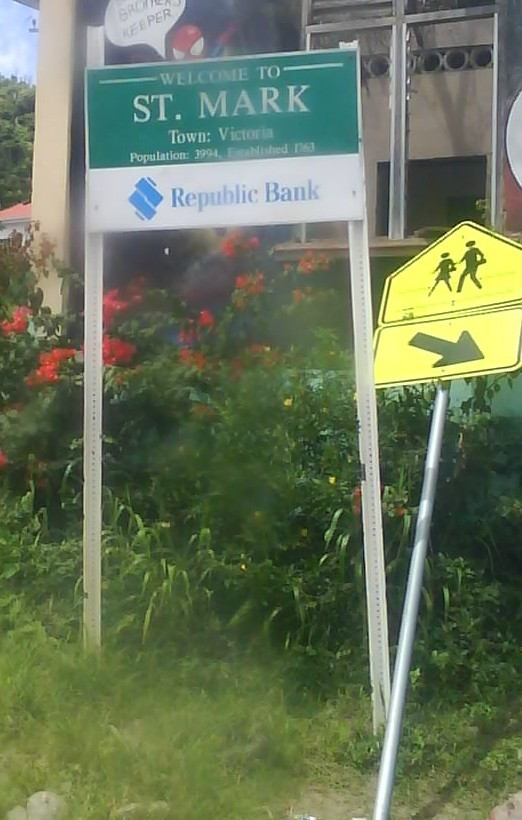
- St Mark Parish Sign

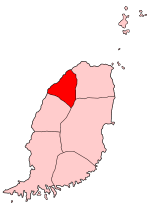
- Country: Grenada
- Capital City: Victoria

Area
  - Total: 8.9 sq mi (23 km^{2})

Population
  - Total: 3,994
  - Density: 410/sq mi (158/km^{2})
- ISO 3166 code: GD-05

Saint Mark is a parish on the west coast of Grenada. It is the smallest parish on the island in terms of both area and population.

== Victoria ==
Along the west coast of the island nation of Grenada lies the small fishing village of Victoria, Grenada. Victoria is the center of activity for the Saint Mark's parish, the smallest parish on the island in both area and populace with approximately 4,000 people residing. Local activities include the Saint Mark's fiesta which showcases different produce, foods, culture, music and entertainment throughout the villages of Saint Mark. Saint Mark's Day is usually a few weeks after Easter in mid April.

== Topography ==
Saint Mark's has the highest mountain on Grenada, Mount Saint Catherine, and the tallest waterfall, the Tufton Hall Waterfall.

== Food Fest ==
The village of Victoria has created a monthly event called the "Sunset City Food Fest." This activity has been created to improve the living conditions of the people of Victoria and have created a common location where the community can come together to enjoy quality food, time and company. It was set up in 2007 in response to the loss of 250 jobs in the nutmeg industry caused by the effects of hurricane Ivan. Thus far the Food Fest is on the last Saturday of each month, however, it is currently aiming to take place fortnightly.

Vendors offer Grenadian cuisine using local ingredients. Dishes include bakes, figs, breadfruit, Farine, Jacks and other Fish, the Grenada Oil-Down, rotis, calaloo soup, crabs, conches (lambi), Tania Log (a porridge prepared from root crops in a traditional manner), and ice cream.
