= GFA First Division =

Association football league in Grenada

- Country: Grenada
- Confederation: CONCACAF
- Number of clubs: 10
- Level on pyramid: 2
- Promotion to: GFA Premier Division
- Relegation to: GFA Second Division
- Domestic cup: GFA Super Knockout Cup
- Current: 2016 GFA First Division

The GFA First Division is the second tier of football in Grenada. The top two teams at the end of each season are promoted to the GFA Premier Division while the third and fourth place teams play the 7th and 8th placed Premier Division teams for advancement via playoffs. The bottom two teams at the end of the season are relegated to the GFA Second Division.
