= Grenada Football Association =

Governing body of association football in Grenada

CONCACAF
- Founded: 1924
- Headquarters: St. George's
- FIFA affiliation: 1978
- CONCACAF affiliation: 1978
- President: Marlon Glean
- Website: http://www.grenadafa.com/

The Grenada Football Association (GFA) is the governing body of football in Grenada. It oversees the Grenada national football team.

In club football, it oversees the GFA Premier League, GFA First Division and GFA Second Division. It also oversees Grenada's top football cup competition, the GFA Super Knockout Cup.

== Association staff ==
Name	Position	Source
(Grenada) Marlon Glean	President	
(Grenada) Carl Andall	Vice President	
(Grenada) Randy Campbell	2nd Vice President	
(Grenada) Carl Lee	General Secretary	
(Grenada) Andray Charles	Treasurer	
(Grenada) Alistar Fleming	Technical Director	
(Grenada) Sharlie Joseph	Team Coach (Men's)	
(Grenada) Jake Rennie	Team Coach (Women's)	
(Grenada) Kern Mason	Media/Communications Manager	
n/a	Futsal Coordinator	
(Grenada) Randy Campbell	Chairperson of the Referees Committee	
(Grenada) Sheldon Carmichael	Head/Director of the Referees Department	
(Grenada) Sheldon Carmichael	Referee Coordinator	

== Logos ==
Previous logo

Previous logo used up until March 2015

== See also ==
- Football in Grenada
