= Hard Rock FC =

Grenadian association football club based in Sateurs

- Full name: Hard Rock Football Club
- Ground: Fond Playing Field, Sauteurs, Grenada
- Capacity: 1,000
- Chairman: Jahmori Andrews
- Manager: Winston Cartridge
- League: GFA Premier Division
- 2025: 6th

Hard Rock FC is a Grenadian professional football club from Sauteurs that plays in the Grenada Premier Division. They have won the league championship on three occasions.

== Honours ==
- Grenada Premier Division
  - Champions (4): 2011, 2012, 2013, 2016
- Waggy T Super Knockout Tournament:
  - Champions (1): 2013
  - Runners-up (1): 2012
