= St. John's SC =

Association football club in Grenada

- Full name: St. John's Sports Club
- Nickname: Marlins
- Ground: Cuthbert Peters Park, Gouyave
- Capacity: 1,000
- Chairman: Jeovanie Summers
- Manager: Godfrey Elijah
- League: GFA Premier Division
- 2025: Champions

St. John's Sports Club is a Grenadian professional football club from Gouyave, Saint John Parish that plays in the Grenada Premier Division.
