= Hurricanes SC =

Grenadian association football club based in Victoria

- Founded: 1957; 69 years ago
- Ground: Alston George Park
- Capacity: 1,000
- League: GFA Premier League
- 2025: 3rd
Home colours	Away colours

Hurricanes SC (formerly known as Carib Hurricane FC) is a Grenadian professional football club from Victoria that plays in the Grenada Premier Division. 1,000 capacity Alston George Park is their home stadium.

== Current squad ==
As of 10 January 2019

Note: Flags indicate national team as defined under FIFA eligibility rules; some limited exceptions apply. Players may hold more than one non-FIFA nationality.

No.	Pos.	Nation	Player
—	GK	GRN	Mark Shaddi
5	DF	GRN	Cassim Langaigne
12	DF	GRN	Kareem Joseph
—	DF	GRN	James Jason
—	DF	GRN	George Rohan
—	DF	GRN	Phillip Shannon
—	DF	GRN	Leaon St. John
—	DF	GRN	Jalon Young

No.	Pos.	Nation	Player
—	DF	GRN	Mackell Ganness
—	DF	GRN	Alek Wilson
—	MF	GRN	Lancaster Joseph
—	MF	GRN	Kwasi Paul
—	MF	GRN	Rickel Augustine
—	MF	IRN	Kian Mehrani
—	MF	GRN	Moron Phillip
—	FW	GRN	Ettienne Richardson
