= Grenada Boys' Secondary School FC =

Association football club in Grenada

- Full name: Grenada Boys' Secondary School Football Club
- Ground: Tanteen Recreation Ground
- Chairman: Zaffari Wilkinson
- Manager: Richardo Collins
- League: GFA Premier Division
- 2017/2018: 8th
- Website: http://chantifootball.com/

Grenada Boys' Secondary School FC is a Grenadian football club from St. George's, Grenada that plays in the Grenada Premier Division. The club represents the Grenada Boys' Secondary School.

== Honors ==
- Grenada League: 2

2000, 2001
