= Queens Park Rangers SC =

Association football club in Grenada

Queens Park Rangers
- Full name: Queens Park Rangers Sports Club
- Nicknames: Rangers, QPR
- Founded: 21 September 1969; 56 years ago
- Ground: Cutbert Peters Park, Gouyave
- Capacity: 1,000
- Chairman: Garvey Cooper
- Manager: Jehandrew Mitchell
- League: Championship
- 2025: 7th

Queens Park Rangers Sports Club is a Grenadian professional football club based in St. George's. The club plays in the Championship. Queens Park Rangers is famous in Grenada as the only first division club to have never been relegated. The club is jointly tied for the most national titles, winning four, with their last title coming in 2002.

== Honours ==
- GFA Premier League
  - Champions (6): 1976, 1982 1984, 1994, 1995, 2002
  - Runners-up (3): 1996, 2001, 2006
