= Paradise FC International =

Association football club in Grenada

Paradise F.C. International
- Full name: Paradise Football Club International
- Founded: April 1998; 28 years ago
- Ground: Progress Park, Paradise, Saint Andrew Parish, Grenada
- Capacity: 1,000
- Chairman: Michael Paul
- Manager: Christopher
- League: GFA Premier Division
- 2025: 2nd

Paradise F.C. International is a Grenadian professional football club from Paradise, Saint Andrew Parish that plays in the Grenada Premier Division. They have won the league championship on five occasions.

== Current squad 2024 ==
2024 CFU Club Shield Note: Flags indicate national team as defined under FIFA eligibility rules; some limited exceptions apply. Players may hold more than one non-FIFA nationality.

No.	Pos.	Nation	Player
—	GK	GRN	Jason Belfon
—	GK	GRN	Jeremy Richardson
—	GK	GRN	Keldon Francis
—	DF	GRN	Quinton Rennie
—	DF	GRN	Carlous Joseph
—	DF	GRN	Michael Mark
—	DF	GRN	Irvin Smith
—	DF	GRN	Dequan Antoine
—	DF	GRN	Gievanni Andrew
—	MF	GRN	Alec Jones
—	MF	GRN	Dorrel Pierre
—	MF	GRN	Steffon Abraham
—	MF	GRN	Carim Bridgeman
—	MF	GRN	Simeon Mitchell
—	MF	GRN	Keishon Clarke
—	MF	GRN	Shonnil Belfon
—	MF	GRN	Zade Douglas
—	MF	GRN	Keston Williams

No.	Pos.	Nation	Player
—	MF	GRN	Jake Rennie
—	MF	GRN	Montell Joseph
—	MF	GRN	Wendell Rennie
—	MF	GRN	Earldon Millette
—	MF	GRN	Aquil Lawlite
—	FW	GRN	Denis Rennie
—	FW	GRN	Shane Rennie
—	FW	GRN	Clive Murray
—	FW	GRN	Joshua Isaac
—	FW	GRN	O'Neil Hosten
—	FW	GRN	Neil Rennie
—	FW	GRN	Kevon Maitland
—	FW	GRN	Delron John

== Honours ==
- GFA Premier League
  - Champions (7): 2005, 2007, 2010, 2014, 2018–19, 2023–24, 2024–2025
  - Runners-up (7): 2003, 2004, 2011, 2012, 2013, 2015, 2017
- GFA Super Knockout Cup
  - Champions (4): 2009, 2012, 2015, 2016
