= Sauteurs =

- Town
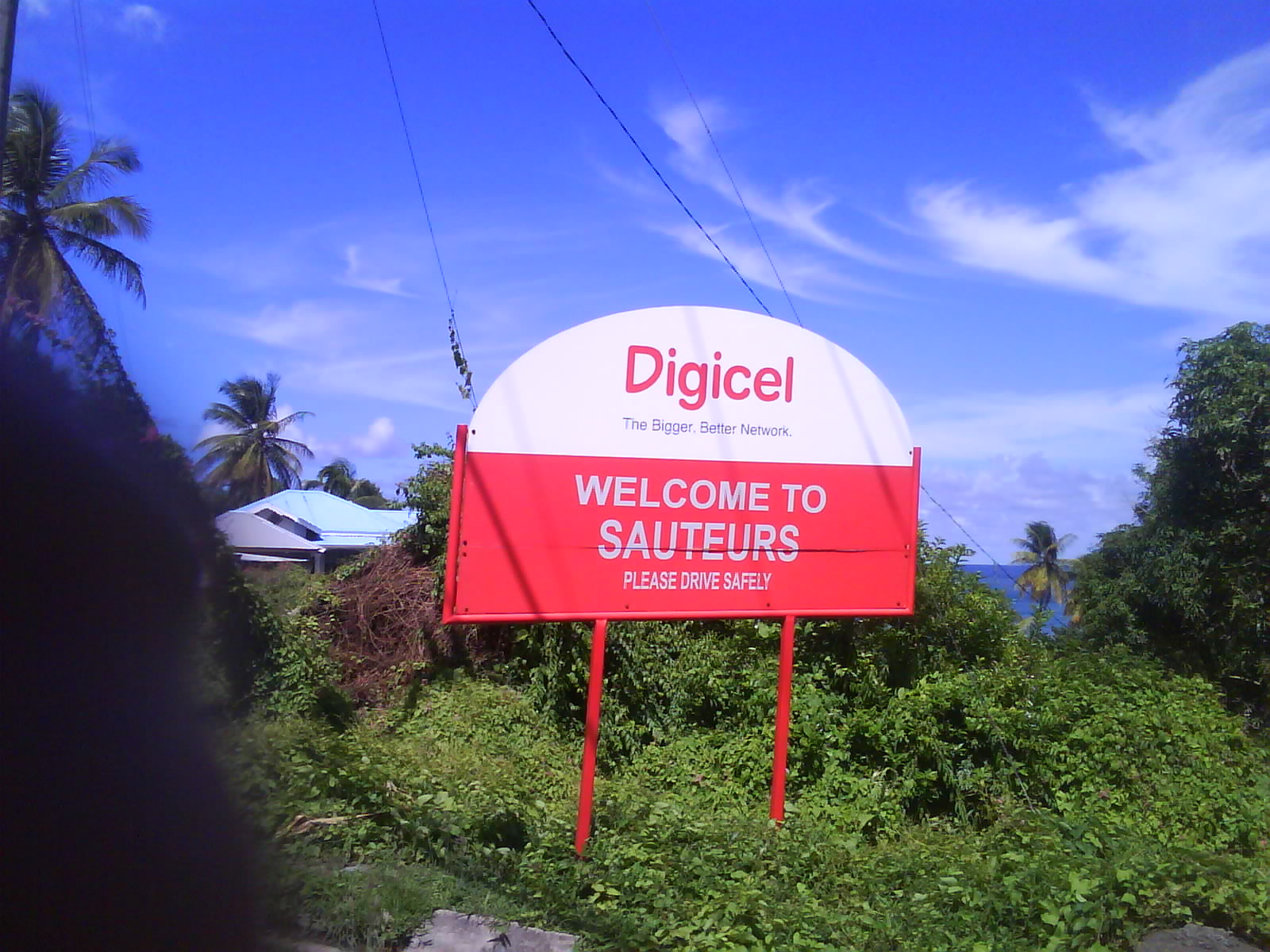
- Sauteurs

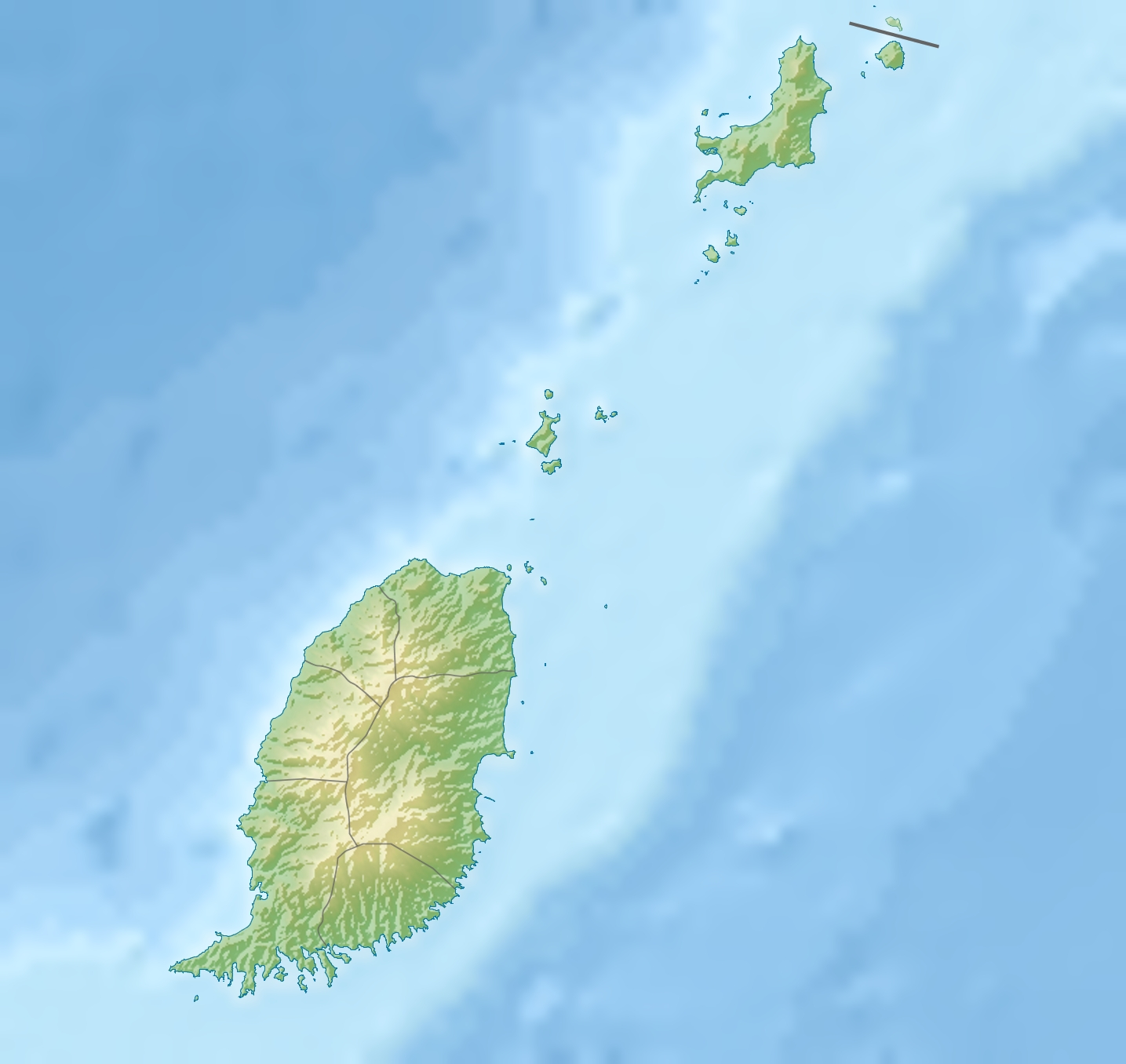
- Location within Grenada
- Coordinates: 12°13′06″N 61°38′21″W
- Country: Grenada
- Parish: Saint Patrick
- Elevation: 285 ft (87 m)

Population (1999)
  - Total: 1,300
- Time zone: UTC-4

Sauteurs (pronounced Sau-tez) is a fishing town in the Saint Patrick Parish, Grenada and is the sixth-largest town on the island of Grenada, with a population of about 1,300. It is located in the far north of Grenada. Sauteurs overlooks the Sauteurs Bay. It is the largest town in the northern part of Grenada, and it is the capital city of the Saint Patrick Parish.

== History ==
In May 1650 the French ambushed a group of Caribs and killed about 40 of them. Some are said to have jumped off a cliff (called Leapers’ hill) to avoid capture. Thus the town was named Sauteurs, which is French for "jumpers".

In 1721, the French established St Patrick's Catholic church, which in 1784 the British government handed over to the Anglicans. However, the church was destroyed by fire. A police station now occupies the site.

On 1 March 1796, HMS Favourite, the armed transport Sally, and two commandeered sloops evacuated some 11 to 2100 British troops and militia who were trapped at Sauteurs by insurgents during Julien Fédon's revolt.

In 1840 a new St Patrick Catholic church was constructed and remains to this day.

== Education ==
In 2012 there were six Government/Assisted schools located in the Sauteurs area. Education is free and compulsory up to the age of 16. There are also several tertiary institutions in Sauteurs, like St. Patrick's Multi-Purpose Training, part of the T.A. Marryshow Community College (TAMCC).

== Images ==
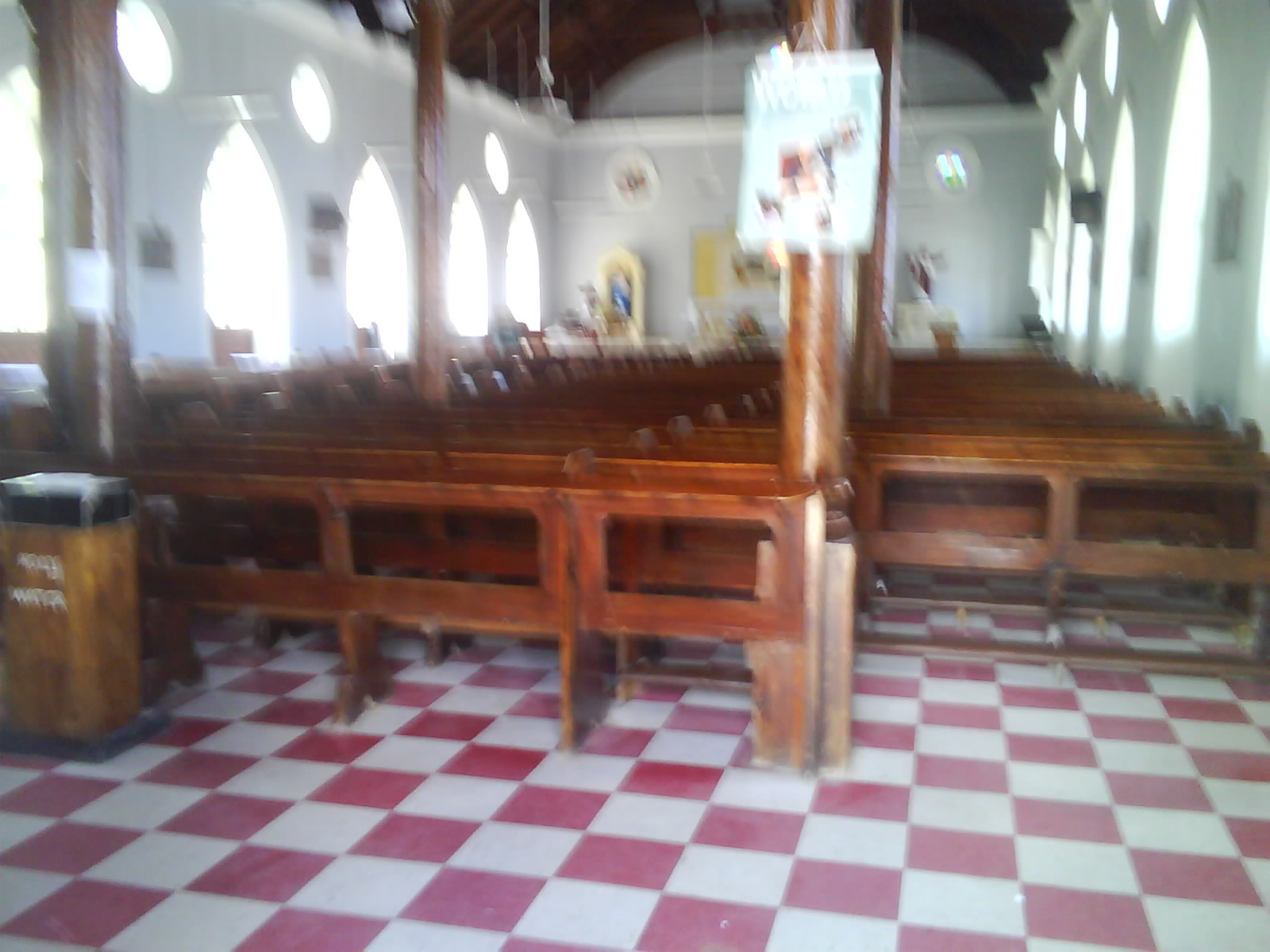
The St. Patrick's Catholic Church

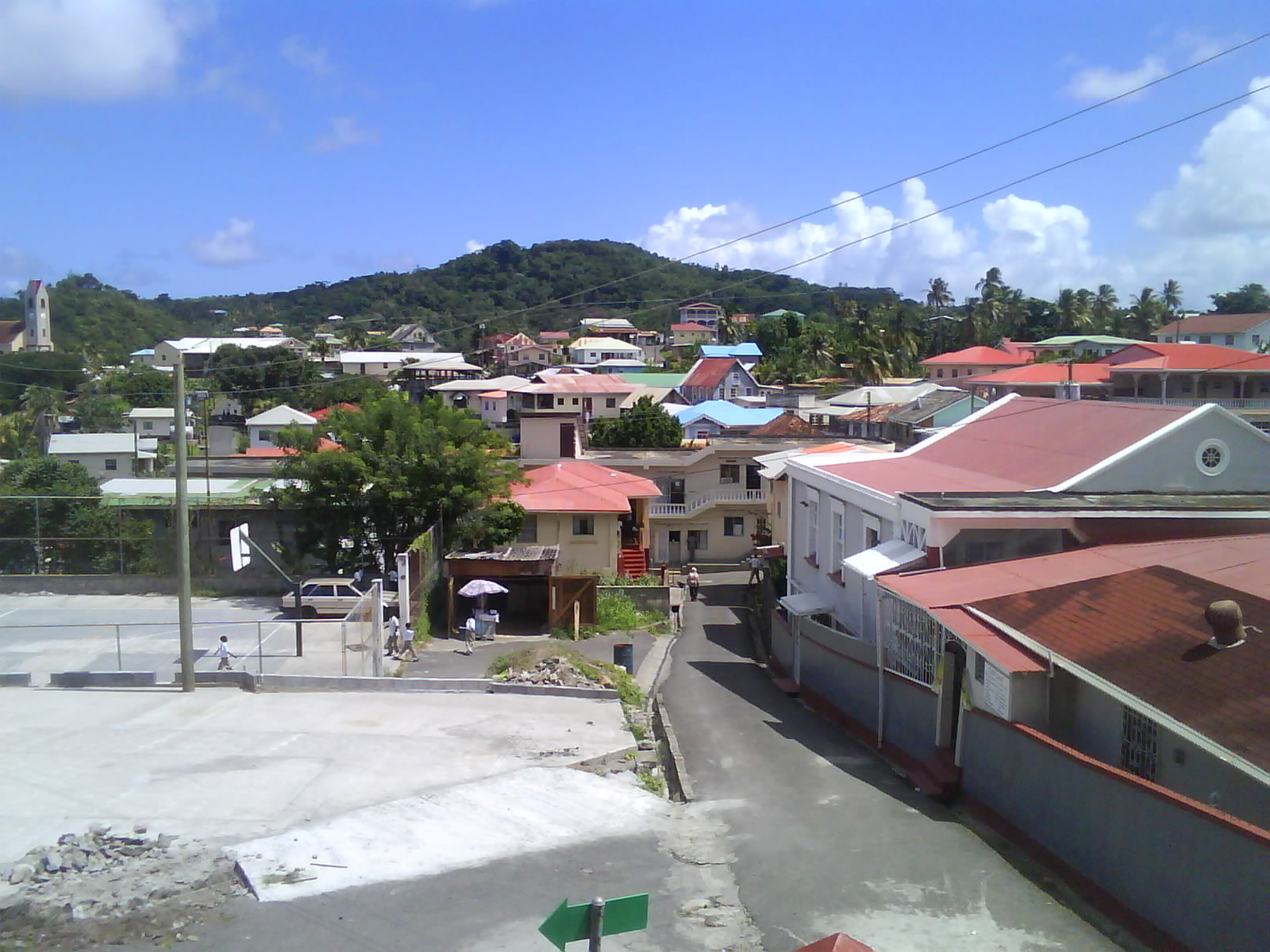
View of the Town

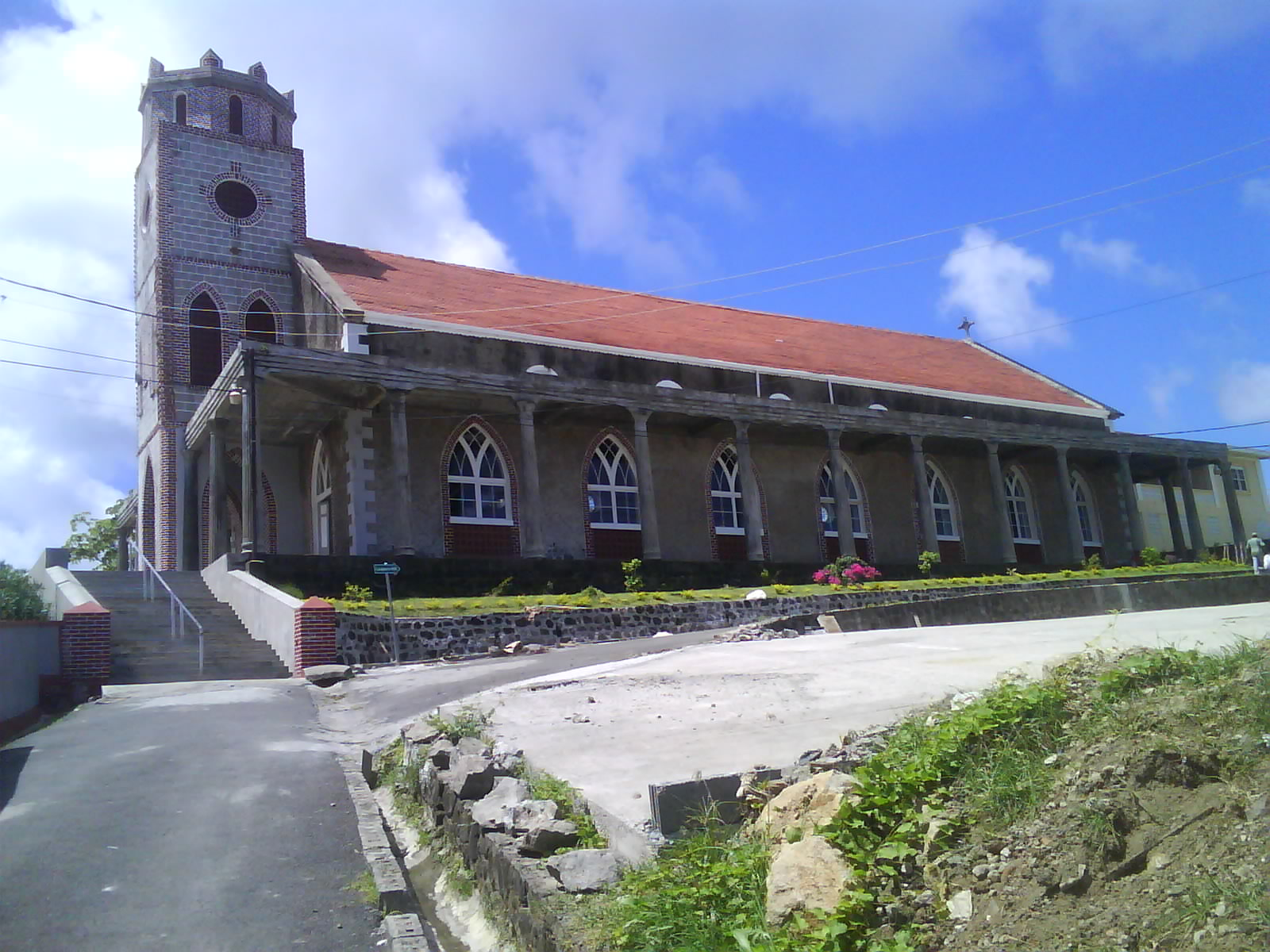
The St. Patrick's Catholic Church

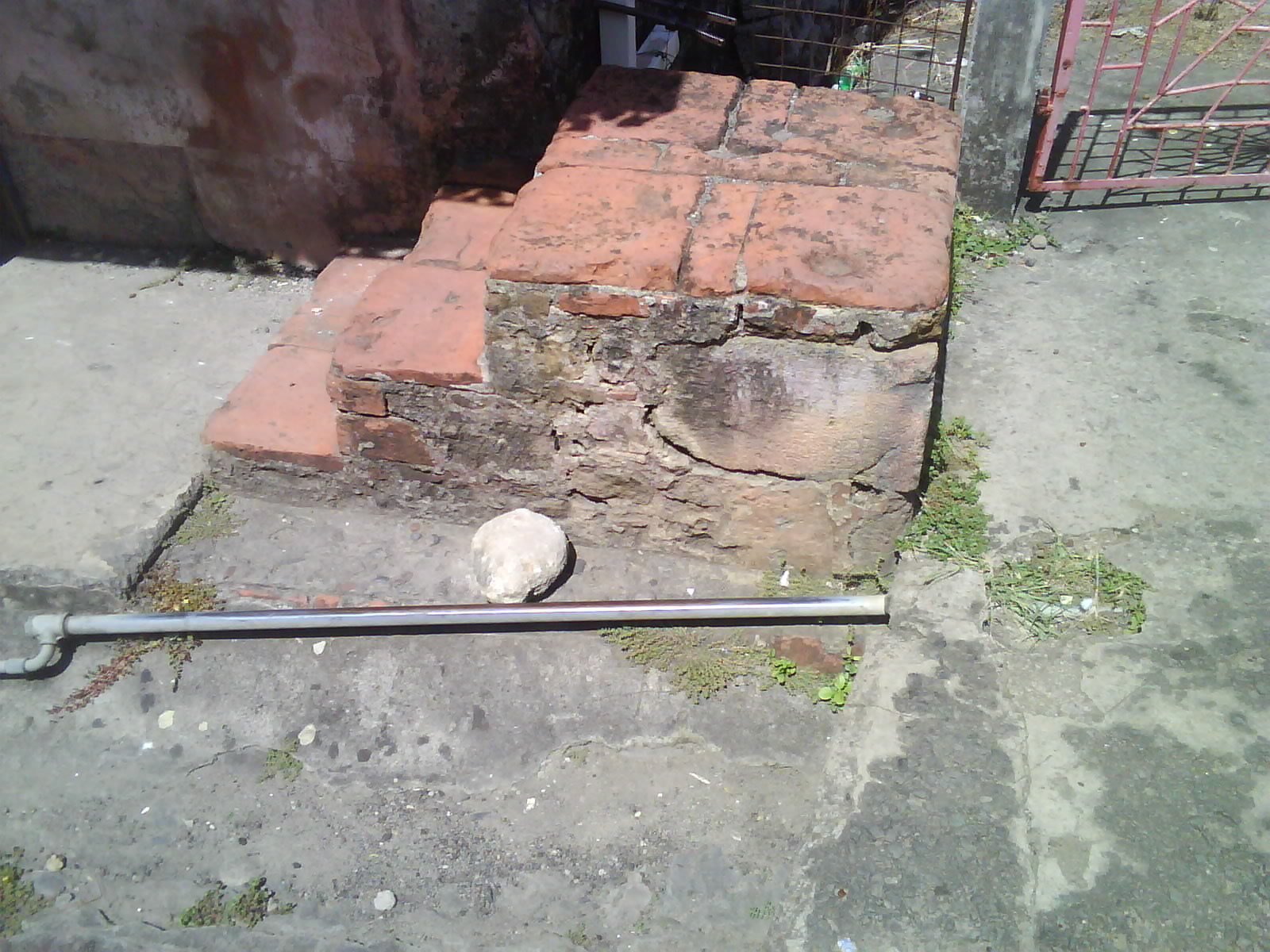
Historic Stair

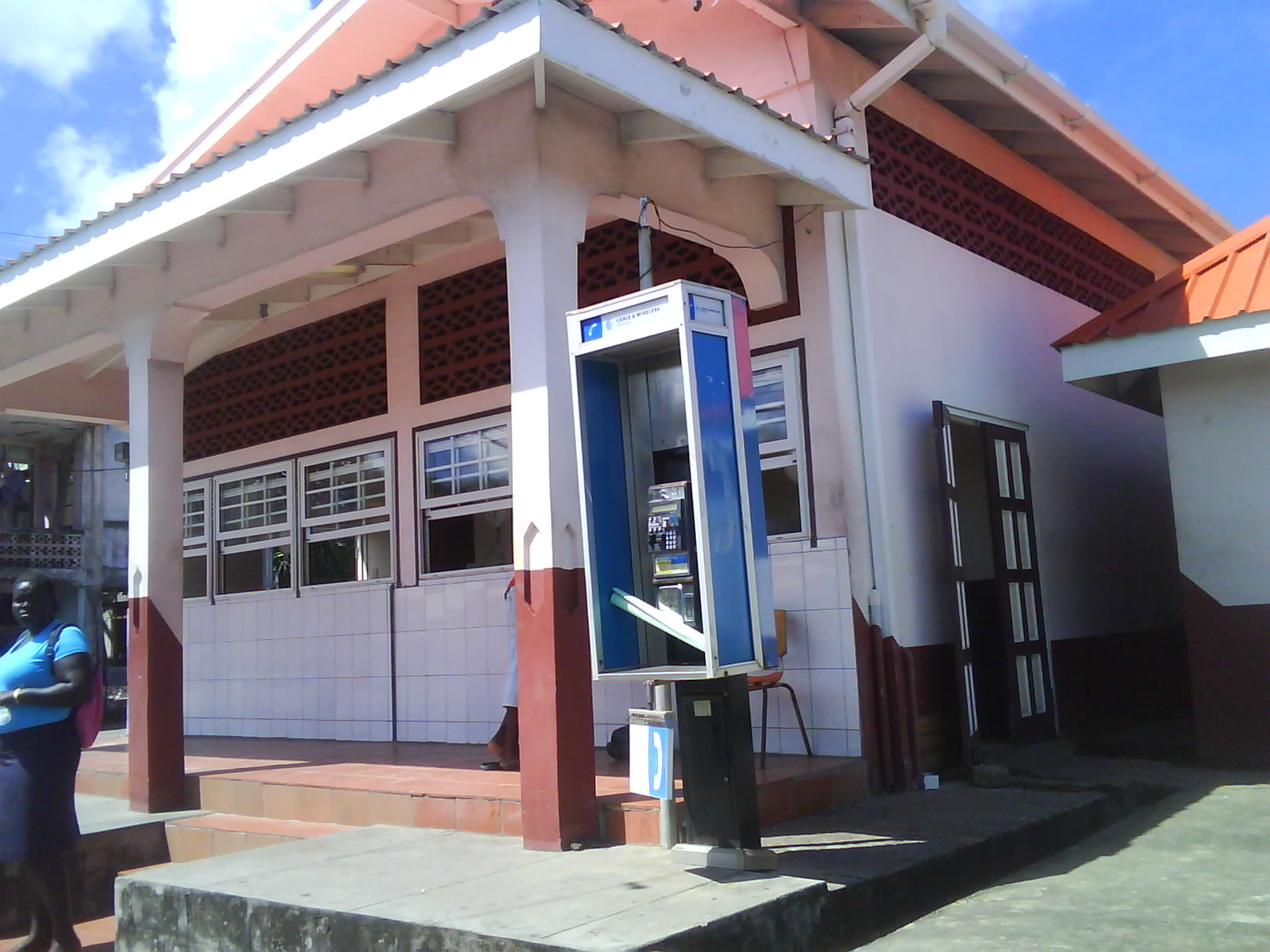
The Fish Market

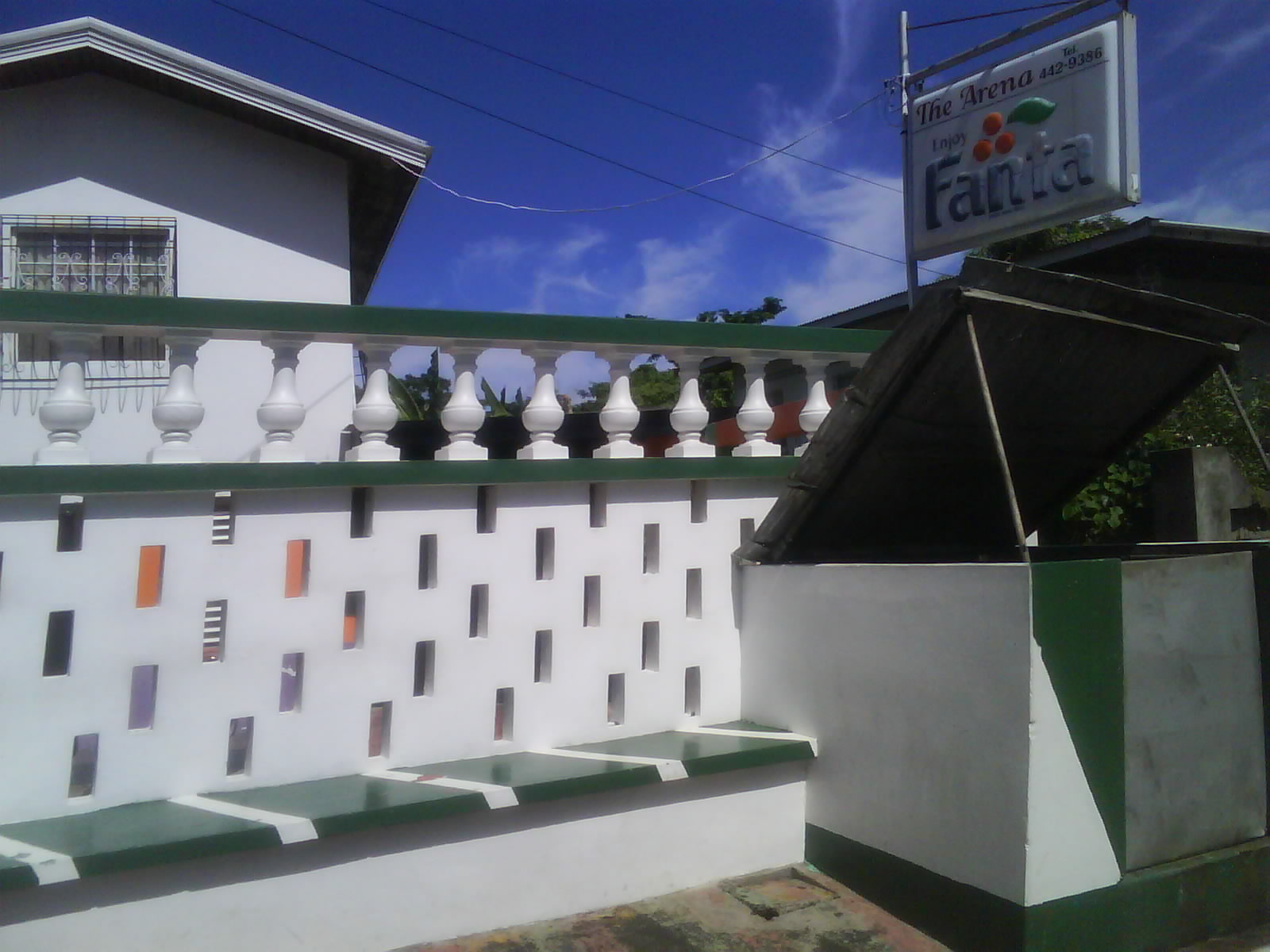
Dancehall in Plains, St. Patricks

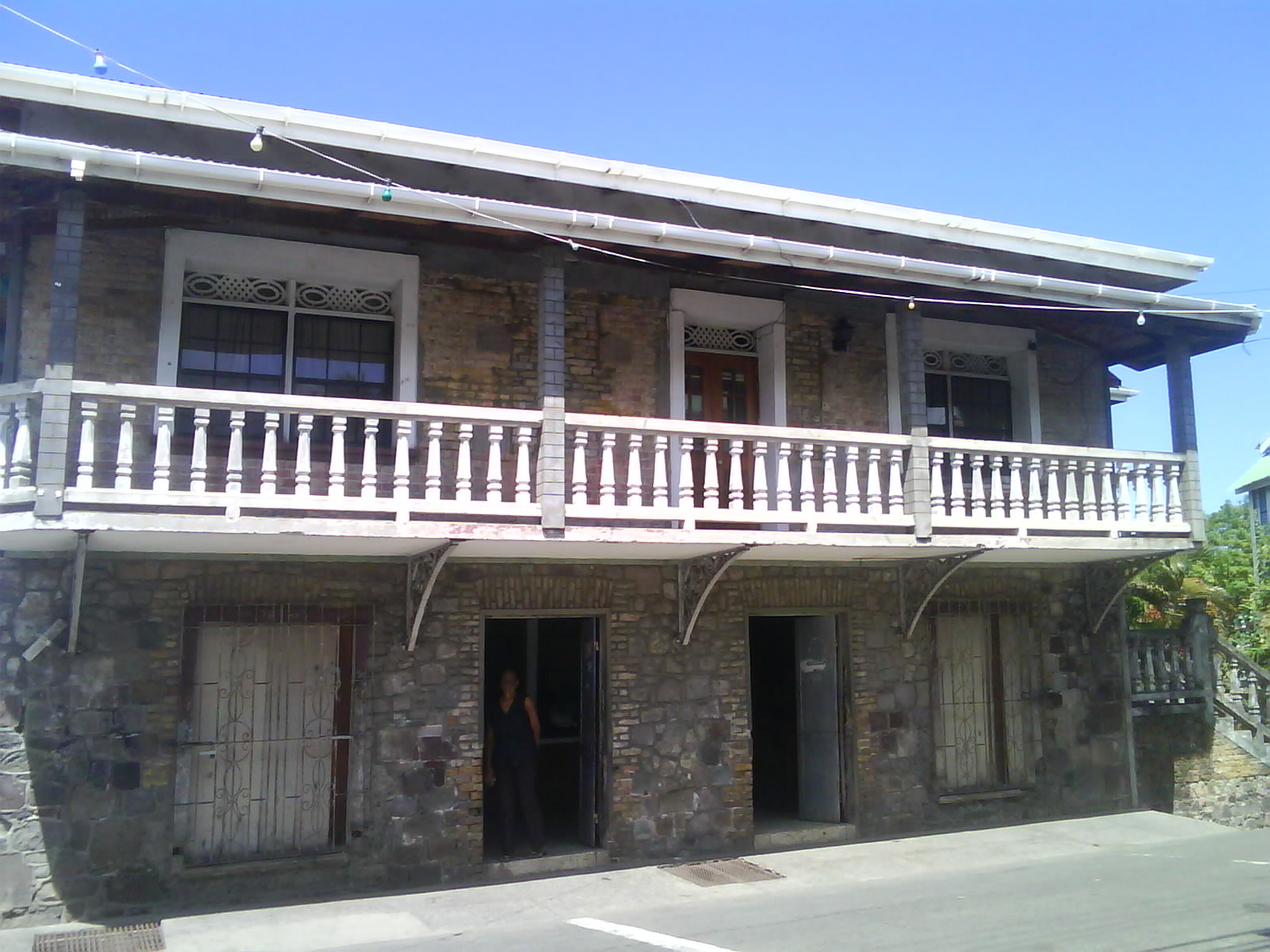
Shop in Sauteurs

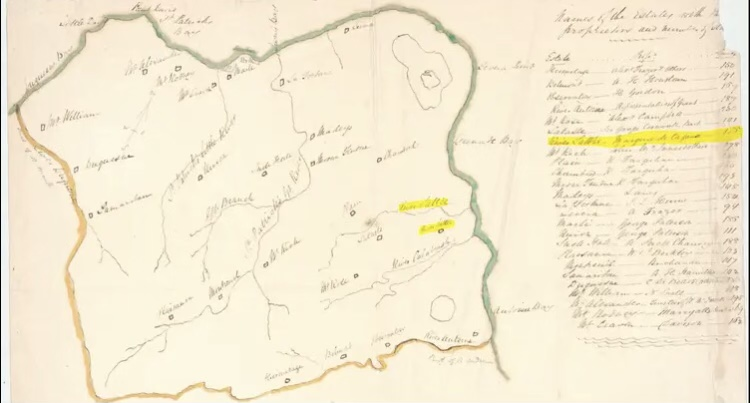
Map of Saint Patrick Parish showing Sauteurs
