= Kirani James Athletic Stadium =

Stadium in Grenada

Coordinates: 12°3′36″N 61°45′13″W

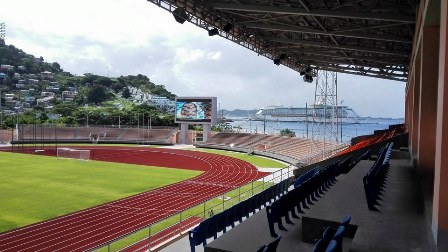
- A view of the stadium
- Interactive map of Kirani James Athletic Stadium
- Former names: Grenada National Stadium
- Location: St. George's, Grenada
- Capacity: 8,000

Construction
- Architect: China State Construction Engineering

Tenant
- Grenada national football team

Grenada National Stadium is a multi-purpose stadium in St. George's, Grenada. It is currently used mostly for football matches. The stadium holds 8,000 people.

It was renamed to Kirani James Athletic Stadium in April 2017, in honour of the first Olympic medallist of Grenada, Kirani James.

== Uses ==
The stadium hosted six games in the 2016 CONCACAF Women's U-17 Championship.

It is home to the Grenada national football team.
