= Gouyave =

Gouyave Gwouyav
- Town
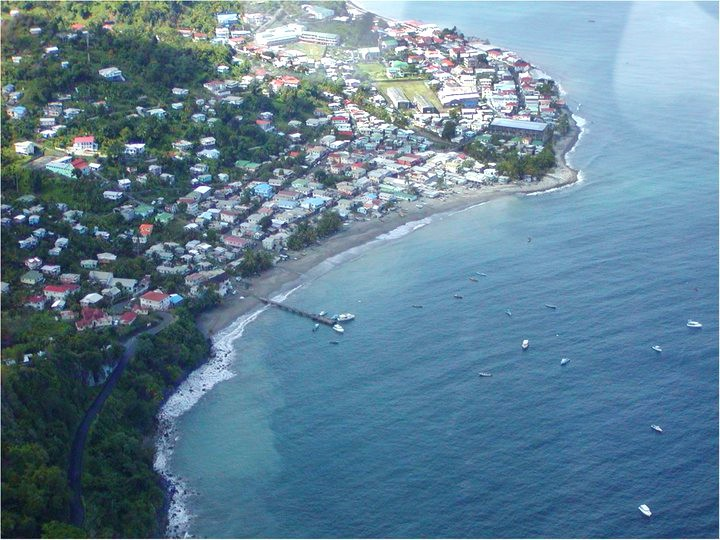

- Location within Grenada
- Coordinates: 12°09′59″N 61°43′48″W
- Country: Grenada
- Parish: Saint John

Government
  - MP: Kerryne James
- Elevation: 269 ft (82 m)

Population (2008)
  - Total: 3,378
- city proper
- Time zone: UTC-4
- Website: Official website

Gouyave (Gwouyav) is the capital and largest town in the parish of St John, Grenada. It is located on the west coast of the island of Grenada.

== History ==
Originally called Charlotte Town after Queen Charlotte of Britain, it was renamed Gouyave by the French because of its guava trees.

== Culture ==
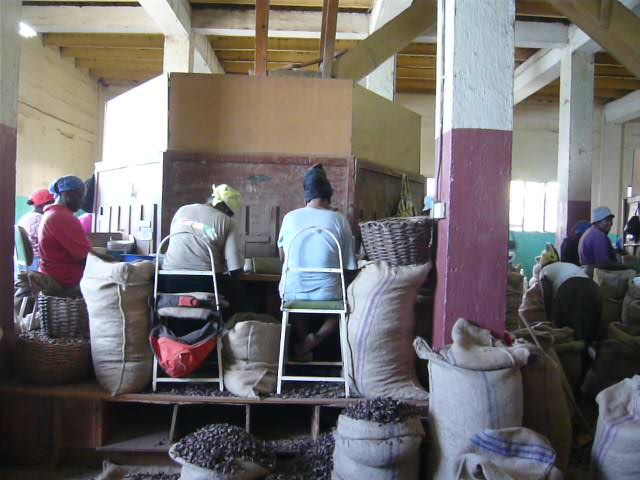
Workers at Gouyave Nutmeg Processing Cooperative station

The town of Gouyave, pronounced locally as “Gwo-ov” has played a pivotal role in the development and sustainance of Grenada's economy throughout its history. Agriculture and fishing used to be the staple of Grenada's economy and the town of Gouyave was not only the center of the fisheries industry, but also the centerpoint of many of the most fertile and productive agriculture plantations on the island. For many years, Grenada was the only nation in the western hemisphere to produce and export nutmeg; which is the main reason why it is often called the Isle of Spice or the Spice Isle. Along with nutmeg, clove and cinnamon are also among Grenada's exports. The plantations and farms surrounding the town of Gouyave produced many of these crops. This is the reason the nutmeg processing plant in Gouyave, or 'The Nutmeg Pool,' as it is called locally, is still the largest building in Grenada.

One of the town's annual celebrations is Fisherman's Birthday. On 29 June, fishermen come from all over Grenada for competitive boat racing, entertainment, fish foods, and many other activities. Also, every Friday the town celebrates 'Fish Friday,' a weekly festival that offers a wide range of fish dishes and entertainment. Fish Friday was founded to promote community development in Gouyave and the overall Parish of St. John by promoting it as a fishing village. The town is also famous for its nutmeg processing plant.
