= Beausejour =

Beausejour or Beauséjour may refer to:

== Places ==
- Beausejour, a district in Casablanca, Morocco
- Beauséjour, the main settlement on the island of La Désirade, Guadeloupe
- Beauséjour (electoral district), a federal electoral district in eastern New Brunswick, Canada
- Beausejour, Manitoba, a town in Manitoba, Canada
  - Beausejour Blades, former ice hockey team in Beausejour
- Beauséjour, Marne, a town in France, a scene of fighting during World War I
- Beauséjour River, a river in Grenada
- Beausejour Stadium, a cricket stadium located near Gros Islet, Saint Lucia
- CFS Beausejour, former Canadian Forces Station
- Fort Beauséjour, a National Historic Site located in Aulac, New Brunswick, Canada
  - Battle of Fort Beauséjour

== People ==
- Henoc Beauséjour (born 1973), known by his stage name Roi Heenok, Canadian rapper, producer and entrepreneur
- Jean Beausejour, a Chilean footballer
- Madeleine Beauséjour, film editor and director from Réunion
- Paul-Félix Beuvain de Beauséjour (1839–1930), French clergyman
