= Bacolet (disambiguation) =

Bacolet is a town in Tobago.

Bacolet may also refer to:

- Bacolet, Grenada
  - Great River of Grand Bacolet
  - Little River of Great Bacolet
- Bacolet Formation, a geologic formation in Trinidad and Tobago

== See also ==
- Bacolet Point, formerly USCGC Point Highland (WPB-82333)
