= Requin =

Requin, shark in French (pl : requins), may refer to:

== Places ==
- Great Requin River, a river of Grenada
- Little Requin River, a river of Grenada

== People ==
- Édouard Réquin (1879–1953), French soldier
- Steve Requin (born 1968), a Canadian cartoonist from Québec
- Michèle Bernard-Requin (1943–2019), French lawyer and magistrate
- Abderrahim Chafay (born 1977; stagename Requin), Moroccan-French Muay Thai kickboxer.

== Ships ==
- French ship Requin, a French Navy shipname
- Requin-class submarine, a class of submarines of French navy in the mid-1920s
  - French submarine Requin (1924)
- USS Requin (SS-481), a United States Navy Tench-class submarine
- a French submarine seized by Italy during World War II and converted into a cargo submarine
- HMS Requin − brig of the French Navy launched in 1794 that the British Royal Navy captured in 1795 and that was wrecked in 1801.

== Entertainment ==
- The Shark (1930 film), French film originally released as Le Requin
- The Requin (film), 2022 U.S. film

== Other uses ==
- Requins de l'Atlantique FC, a football club of Benin playing in the town of Cotonou

== See also ==
- Shark (disambiguation)
