= St. Francis River (disambiguation) =

The St. Francis River is a tributary of the Mississippi River in Missouri and Arkansas in the United States.

St. Francis River or Saint Francis River may also refer to:

- St. Francis River (Minnesota), a tributary of the Elk River in Minnesota in the United States
- Saint Francis River (Grenada) in Saint Andrew Parish on the east coast of Grenada
- Saint Francis River (Canada–United States), a tributary of the St. John River in Quebec, Maine, and New Brunswick which forms part of the Canada–United States border

== See also ==
- Saint-François River, a tributary of the Saint Lawrence River in Quebec, Canada
- San Francisco River (disambiguation), a list of rivers with this name
- São Francisco River, the fourth longest Brazilian river and longest that starts runs entirely in Brazilian territory
- Lake Saint Francis (disambiguation)
