= Grelier =

Grelier is a French surname. Notable people with the surname include:

- Estelle Grelier (born 1973), French politician
- Jean-Carles Grelier (born 1966), French politician

== See also ==
- Gaulier (disambiguation)
- Grolier (disambiguation)
