= Paradise, Grenada =

Paradise
- Village
- Location within Grenada
- Coordinates: 12°8′14″N 61°37′23″W
- Country: Grenada
- Parish: Saint Andrew's
- Elevation: 663 ft (202 m)
- Time zone: UTC-4

Paradise (Grenadian Creole: Pawadis) is a town in Saint Andrew's Parish, Grenada. It is located in the east of the island, between Grenville and Dunfermline.

== Geography ==
The settlement is located along the Grand Bras at the lower course of the Balthazar River (Grand Bras/Great Branch) and north of Grenville. Nearby are Dunfermline, Lower Pearls, and Simon.

== Tourism ==
Paradise is a small rural community, surrounded by lush hills and farmland on the east coast of Grenada island. Not a mainstream tourist destination, it attracts visitors seeking eco-tourism, culture and local life rather than luxury resorts.
