= Tante =

Tante is the French, Dutch (Nederland), Indonesia (based on Dutch language), German, Danish, Yiddish and Latvian word for aunt (female sibling of a parent)

Tante may also refer to:

- A novel by Anne Douglas Sedgwick, upon which the film The Impossible Woman is based
- Tante Leen (1912–1992), Dutch folk singer
- Tante Rose, a racehorse
- Tante Sidonia, a character from the Belgian comics series Suske en Wiske
- Tante Koosje, a restaurant located in Loenen aan de Vecht in the Netherlands
- Tante Marie, a cookery school in Woking, Surrey, England
- La Tante DC10 Restaurant, Accra, Ghana; a restaurant built into a green DC-10 former airliner
- La Tante River, Grenada; a river on the island of Grenada

== See also ==
- Upper La Tante, Saint David, Grenada; a town
- La grand'tante (The Great-Aunt), an 1867 comic opera
