= Charlotte River =

Charlotte River may refer to:

- Charlotte River (Florida), former name for a presumed waterway in Florida, United States
- Charlotte River (Grenada), in Saint John Parish, Grenada
- Charlotte River (Michigan), tributary of the St. Marys River in Chippewa County, Michigan, United States
- Charlotte Creek (New York) (previously Charlotte River), a tributary of the Susquehanna, New York, United States

== See also ==
- Shallotte River, in Brunswick County, North Carolina, United States
