= Black Bay River =

Black Bay River may refer to:

- Black Bay River (Grenada)
- Black Bay River (Saint Lucia)
