= Antoine River =

Antoine River may refer to:

- Antoine River (Arkansas), tributary of the Little Missouri River in Arkansas, United States
- Antoine River (Grenada), flows to the Caribbean sea
- Antoine River (Quebec), a river in Quebec
