= List of shipwrecks in January 1841 =

The list of shipwrecks in January 1841 includes ships sunk, foundered, wrecked, grounded, or otherwise lost during January 1841.

== 1 January ==
List of shipwrecks: 1 January 1841
Ship	State	Description
Guernsey Lily	(United Kingdom of Great Britain and Ireland) Guernsey	The ship was wrecked on the Minquiers, off Jersey, Channel Islands with the loss of all hands.
Ida	Prussia	The schooner ran aground at Riga, Russia. She was refloated the next day and put back to Riga.
Lady Middleton	United Kingdom	The schooner was wrecked on the Cross Sand, in the North Sea off the coast of Norfolk with the loss of three of her five crew. She was on a voyage from Newcastle upon Tyne, Northumberland to Ipswich, Suffolk.

== 2 January ==
List of shipwrecks: 2 January 1841
Ship	State	Description
Active	Portugal	The schooner was discovered abandoned in the Atlantic Ocean by the barque Johanna Maria (Denmark). Five men were put on board and she was taken into Madeira.
Clonmel	(United Kingdom of Great Britain and Ireland) New South Wales	The paddle steamer was wrecked at Corner Inlet. All on board were rescued.
Freden	(Russian Empire) Grand Duchy of Finland	The ship ran aground off Nysted, Denmark. She was on a voyage from London, United Kingdom to "Rannes".
Industry	United Kingdom	The ship was driven ashore at Harwich, Essex.
Jemima	United Kingdom	The ship was wrecked at Bayonne, Basses-Pyrénées, France. She was on a voyage from London to Bayonne.
Lion	United Kingdom	The ship foundered off Tory Island, County Donegal with the loss of all hands. She was on a voyage from Killala, County Mayo to Liverpool, Lancashire.
Loyal William	United Kingdom	The ship was driven ashore at Inverkip, Renfrewshire. She was on a voyage from Jersey, Channel Islands to Glasgow, Renfrewshire. Loyal William was refloated on 11 January and resumed her voyage.
Permit or Pursuit	United Kingdom	The ship was driven ashore east of Gravelines, Nord, France. She was on a voyage from St. Davids to Pernambuco, Brazil.
President	United States	The ship ran aground on the Nore. She was on a voyage from New York to London. She was refloated and completed her voyage.

== 3 January ==
List of shipwrecks: 3 January 1841
Ship	State	Description
Adolphe	France	The ship was driven ashore at Vlissingen, Zeeland, Netherlands.
Alert	United Kingdom	The brig foundered in the English Channel off the Nab Lightship ( Trinity House).
Aurora	United Kingdom	The schooner foundered in the Irish Sea 2 nautical miles (3.7 km) off Strangford, County Down.
Caspian	United States	The ship ran aground at New Orleans, Louisiana. She was still aground on 14 January.
Elizabeth	United States	The ship ran aground at New Orleans.
Eucharist	France	The ship was driven ashore and wrecked at Boulogne, Pas-de-Calais. She was on a voyage from Martinique to Havre de Grâce, Seine-Inférieure.
Flora	Belgium	The ship was driven ashore and wrecked at Ostend, West Flanders. Her crew were rescued. She was on a voyage from Bordeaux, Gironde, France to Antwerp.
Gesina	Bremen	The galiot was driven ashore at Bremerhaven. She was on a voyage from Sunderland, County Durham, United Kingdom to Bremen. Gesina was refloated and taken into Bremen.
Henry Davenport	United Kingdom	The ship was wrecked at "Port Mattoon". She was on a voyage from Halifax to Yarmouth, Nova Scotia, British North America.
Industry	United Kingdom	The ship was driven ashore at Old Grimsby, Isles of Scilly.
Isabella	United Kingdom	The ship was wrecked on the Horse Bank, off Southport. She laden with Pig iron on a voyage from Glasgow, Renfrewshire to Liverpool, Lancashire.
Jean et Marie	France	The ship was driven ashore east of Boulogne, Pas-de-Calais. She was on a voyage from Cette, Hérault to Boulogne.
Jean Gordon	United Kingdom	The ship was driven ashore at Stranraer, Wigtownshire with the loss of four of her crew. She was on a voyage from Cork to Ayr. Lloyds Register 1840 and Ayr Observer Jan 5 say it was the Jane Gordon.
Lavinia	(United Kingdom of Great Britain and Ireland) Guernsey	The ship ran aground on the Cross Sand, in the North Sea off the coast of Norfolk. Lavinia was on a voyage from St. Ubes, Portugal to Hull, Yorkshire. She was refloated on 3 January and taken into Great Yarmouth, Norfolk for repairs.
Maria Aletta	Netherlands	The galiot was driven ashore at Portrush, County Antrim, United Kingdom. She was refloated on 7 January.
Mary Walker	United Kingdom	The ship was driven ashore in Girvan Bay, where she was subsequently wrecked. Her crew were rescued. She was on a voyage from Demerara, British Honduras to the Clyde.
Nicolina Emilia	United Kingdom	The ship ran aground on the Herd Sand, in the North Sea off the coast of County Durham. She was on a voyage from King's Lynn, Norfolk to South Shields, County Durham.
Ocmulgee	United States	The ship ran aground at New Orleans.
Pink	United Kingdom	The fishing smack was wrecked on the Gunfleet Sand, in the North Sea off the coast of Essex. Her crew were rescued by a Barking smack.
Sarah Jane	United Kingdom	The brig ran aground off Leith, Lothian. She was on a voyage from Cuba to Leith. Sarah Jane was refloated on 6 January and towed into Leith.

== 4 January ==
List of shipwrecks: 4 January 1841
Ship	State	Description
Ancelle	United States	The ship ran aground at New Orleans, Louisiana. She was refloated and resumed her voyage.
Barbary	United Kingdom	The ship ran aground and was wrecked at Woodbridge, Suffolk. She was on a voyage from Newcastle upon Tyne, Northumberland to Woodbridge. Barbary was refloated on 6 January and taken into Harwich.
British Queen	United Kingdom	The schooner was driven ashore at Troon, Ayrshire.
Dart	United Kingdom	The ship ran aground on the Middle Sand, in the North Sea off the coast of Essex. She was on a voyage from Liverpool, Lancashire to London. Dart was refloated and taken into Wivenhoe, Essex.
Elizabeth	United Kingdom	The flat was driven ashore at Wicklow. Her crew were rescued. She was refloated on 9 January and taken into Wicklow for repairs.
Fleece	United Kingdom	The ship was driven ashore at Holyhead, Anglesey. She was on a voyage from Newry, County Antrim to Irvine, Ayrshire. She was refloated on 5 January and subsequently resumed her voyage.
Grace	United Kingdom	The ship ran aground and was severely damaged at Shoreham-by-Sea, Sussex.
Hero	United Kingdom	The ship ran aground at King's Lynn, Norfolk. She was refloated on 8 January.
Industry	United Kingdom	The ship was driven ashore at Bridlington, East Riding of Yorkshire. Her crew were rescued by the Bridlington Lifeboat. She was on a voyage from Honfleur, Calvados, France to South Shields, County Durham. Industry was refloated on 6 January and proceeded for Newcastle upon Tyne.
James Dean	United Kingdom	The ship was driven ashore at Stranraer, Wigtownshire. She was on a voyage from Montreal, Lower Canada, British North America to Glasgow, Renfrewshire. James Dean was refloated and taken into Greenock, Renfrewshire.
Ligonier	United States	The ship was driven ashore at New Orleans. She was refloated and resumed her voyage.
Londonderry	United Kingdom	The ship struck the pier and sank at Sunderland, County Durham.
Matilda	United Kingdom	The ship was driven ashore and severely damaged at Newburgh, Fife. She was refloated on 8 January.
Mountaineer	United Kingdom	The steamship ran aground and sank in Lough Swilly or the Menai Strait. She was on a voyage from Liverpool, Lancashire to Swansea, Glamorgan.
Riga	United Kingdom	The brig was driven ashore at Hartlepool, County Durham. She was on a voyage from London to Hartlepool. Riga was refloated on 7 January.
Robust	United Kingdom	The ship lost her rudder in Saint Tudwal's Islands and was consequently beached at Aberdyfi, Merionethshire. Her crew were rescued. She was on a voyage from Newfoundland, British North America to Liverpool, Lancashire. Robust was refloated the next day and taken into Aberystwyth, Cardiganshire.
Sarah and Elizabeth	United Kingdom	The ship ran aground on the Goodwin Sands, Kent and was damaged. She was on a voyage from Sydney, New South Wales to London. Sarah and Elizabeth was refloated and put into Ramsgate, Kent.
Sirocco	United Kingdom	The brig was driven ashore at Cleethorpes, Lincolnshire. She was refloated on 7 January and towed into Grimsby for repairs.
Sultana	United Kingdom	The ship was struck by lightning in the Pelawan Passage and was destroyed. Forty-one people were rescued. She was on a voyage from Singapore to China.
Thames	United Kingdom	The steamship was wrecked on Jackey's Rock (grid reference SV83600639) in the Isles of Scilly, with the loss of all but two of the 65 people on board. She was on a voyage from Dublin to London.
Trafalgar	United Kingdom	The sloop was driven ashore near North Sunderland, County Durham. Her crew were rescued by the North Sunderland Lifeboat. She was on a voyage from Crail, Fife to Newcastle upon Tyne, Northumberland. Trafalgar was refloated on 27 January and taken into Sunderland.
Vegesack	Bremen	The ship sank off Fedderwarden. All on board were rescued. She was on a voyage from London to Bremen.
Vine	United Kingdom	The brig was driven ashore and damaged at Grimsby, Lincolnshire. She was on a voyage from London to Sunderland. She was later refloated and taken into Grimsby for repairs
Young Alexander	United Kingdom	The sloop was driven ashore and wrecked at Scrabster, Caithness. She was on a voyage from Thurso, Caithness to Rosehearty, Aberdeenshire.

== 5 January ==
List of shipwrecks: 5 January 1841
Ship	State	Description
Dolphin	United Kingdom	The ship sprang a leak and was abandoned in the Atlantic Ocean off the Isles of Scilly. Her crew were rescued by Xenophon.
Earl of Bridgewater	United Kingdom	The ship was in collision with the steamship Merlin (United Kingdom) and foundered at Liverpool, Lancashire.
Edward Woodhouse	United Kingdom	The ship was wrecked in the "Freas Islands", Spain with the loss of all but one of her crew. She was on a voyage from Great Yarmouth, Norfolk to Genoa, Kingdom of Sardinia.
James Hamilton	United Kingdom	The ship was driven ashore at Douglas, Isle of Man. She was on a voyage from Dublin to Troon, Ayrshire. James Hamilton was refloated.
Jemima	United Kingdom	The ship was wrecked at Bilbao, Spain.
Le Jeune Ruffin	France	The schooner was wrecked near "Guccho", Spain with the loss of two lives.
Matilda	United Kingdom	The ship was driven ashore and severely damaged 1 nautical mile (1.9 km) south of Bridlington, Yorkshire. She was on a voyage from a Scottish port to Newcastle upon Tyne, Northumberland. Matilda was later refloated
Ninus	United Kingdom	The ship was driven ashore at Scratby, Norfolk.
Osnaburgh	United Kingdom	The sloop was driven ashore and wrecked north of North Sunderland, County Durham. Her crew were rescued by the North Sunderland Lifeboat. She was on a voyage from Renfrew to Newcastle upon Tyne. Osnaburgh broke up in March.
Theodore Kerner	Netherlands	The ship ran aground at Cowes, Isle of Wight. She was on a voyage from Batavia, Netherlands East Indies to Rotterdam, South Holland. Theodore Kerner was refloated on 6 January.
Venus	United Kingdom	The ship was driven ashore near Caister-on-Sea, Norfolk. She was refloated on 11 January.
Venus	United Kingdom	The ship was wrecked in the Bristol Channel. Her crew were rescued.
Zena and Harriet	United Kingdom	The ship was wrecked at Ilfracombe, Devon. Her crew were rescued. She was on a voyage from Newport, Monmouthshire to Barnstaple, Devon.

== 6 January ==
List of shipwrecks: 6 January 1841
Ship	State	Description
Dorade	France	The ship was driven ashore at Marseille, Bouches-du-Rhône. Her crew were rescued. She was on a voyage from Dunkerque, Nord to Marseille.
Garrick	United States	The ship was driven ashore 25 nautical miles (46 km) south of Sandy Hook, New Jersey. All on board were rescued. She was on a voyage from Liverpool, Lancashire, United Kingdom to New York, United States. Garrick was refloated on 24 January and taken into New York. She was deemed repairable.
Horatio	United Kingdom	The ship was driven ashore on Rutland Island, County Donegal. She was on a voyage from Barbados to the Clyde. Horatio was refloated but ran aground and capsized. She was refloated the next day.

== 7 January ==
List of shipwrecks: 7 January 1841
Ship	State	Description
Alice	United Kingdom	The barque was driven ashore and wrecked at Blyth, Northumberland. She was on a voyage from London to Blyth.
Christine Louise	Sweden	The ship ran aground on the Hamilton Bank, in the Solent. She was on a voyage from Gävle to Valparaíso, Chile.
George McLeod	United Kingdom	The ship was driven ashore in Rothesay Bay. She was on a voyage from Singapore to Greenock, Renfrewshire. She was refloated and resumed her voyage.
Gustava	Hamburg	The ship ran aground on the Schaarhorn. She was on a voyage from New York, United States to Hamburg. Gustava was refloated and taken into Cuxhaven in a leaky condition.
Hamies	United Kingdom	The ship ran aground and was damaged at Fleetwood, Lancashire. She was on a voyage from Limerick to Glasgow, Renfrewshire.
Hebbles Lightship	Trinity House	The lightship was driven ashore by ice near Hull, Yorkshire.
Mersey	United Kingdom	The ship was driven ashore and severely damaged by ice near Hull. She was on a voyage from Hull to Savannah, Georgia, United States.

== 8 January ==
List of shipwrecks: 8 January 1841
Ship	State	Description
Abeona	United Kingdom	The ship was severely damaged at King's Lynn, Norfolk.
Grace Brown	United Kingdom	The ship was driven ashore on the coast of the United States and was abandoned. She was on a voyage from Liverpool, Lancashire to Baltimore, Maryland. Grace was refloated the next day and taken into Norfolk, Virginia.
Horatio	(United Kingdom of Great Britain and Ireland) Guernsey	The ship struck a sunken rock at Saint Sampson, Guernsey and was beached. She was on a voyage from Saint Sampson to Bristol, Gloucestershire.
Jessie	United Kingdom	The ship was driven ashore at "Fainly". She was on a voyage from Dundalk, County Louth to Greenock, Renfrewshire.
Mary	United Kingdom	The ship was driven onto rocks and wrecked at Jersey, Channel Islands.

== 9 January ==
List of shipwrecks: 9 January 1841
Ship	State	Description
Annas	United Kingdom	The ship struck the Brest Rock and sank off the coast of Ayrshire. She was on a voyage from Newport, Monmouthshire to Troon, Ayrshire.
Arctic	United Kingdom	The ship was driven ashore and wrecked at Ingoldmells, Lincolnshire.
Dove	United Kingdom	The ship was driven ashore at Rye, Sussex.
Earl of Selkirk	United Kingdom	The ship was driven ashore on Walney Island, Lancashire. Her crew were rescued. She was on voyage from Whitehaven, Cumberland to Preston, Lancashire.
Emma	United Kingdom	The brig was wrecked 8 nautical miles (15 km) south of Cape Mondego, Portugal with the loss of five of her nine crew. She was on a voyage from Guernsey, Channel Islands to St. Ubes, Portugal.
Hawk	United Kingdom	The schooner was wrecked on the "Isle of Brewer", off the east coast of Africa. Her crew were rescued.
Jonge Kea	France	The ship was driven ashore 3 nautical miles (5.6 km) south of Rye. She was on a voyage from Honfleur, Calvados to Sunderland, County Durham, United Kingdom. She was refloated on 16 January and taken into Rye.
Ocean	United States	The schooner was wrecked at "Chimlico", British Honduras.
Penelope	United Kingdom	The ship sank at King's Lynn, Norfolk.
Sovereign	United Kingdom	The ship was driven ashore at Filey Brig, Yorkshire. She was later refloated and beached. Sovereign was subsequently towed into Scarborough, Yorkshire.
Waterloo	United Kingdom	The ship was driven ashore at Filey. She was refloated on 9 January and taken into Scarborough, Yorkshire.

== 10 January ==
List of shipwrecks: 10 January 1841
Ship	State	Description
Alberdina	Kingdom of Hanover	The ship was driven ashore near Delfzijl, Groningen, Netherlands. She was on a voyage from Great Yarmouth, Norfolk, United Kingdom to a port in East Frisia.
Alexander	United Kingdom	The brig ran aground off Flamborough Head, Yorkshire and was severely damaged. Her crew were rescued. She was on a voyage from Sunderland, County Durham to London. Alexander subsequently broke up.
Edward	United Kingdom	The ship was wrecked on the Bull Sand, in the North Sea. Her crew were rescued. She was on a voyage from Sunderland to London.
Emma	United Kingdom	The ship was wrecked on Bland's Point, Yorkshire. Her crew were rescued. She was on a voyage from London to Newcastle upon Tyne, Northumberland.
Fame	United Kingdom	The ship was wrecked by ice off Harlingen, Friesland, Netherlands. Her crew were rescued. She was on a voyage from London to Harlingen.
John and Mary	United Kingdom	The ship foundered in the English Channel off The Lizard, Cornwall.
John Barrow	United Kingdom	The ship ran aground on the Gunfleet Sand, in the North Sea off the coast of Essex. She was on a voyage from Sandon to Whitby, Yorkshire. John Barrow was refloated and taken into Harwich, Essex in a leaky condition.
Mercy	United Kingdom	The ship ran aground off Flamborough Head and was severely damaged. She was on a voyage from Great Yarmouth to Sunderland.
Northern	United Kingdom	The ship ran aground off Harlingen. Her crew were rescued. She was on a voyage from London to Harlingen.
Orwell	United Kingdom	The ship was wrecked by ice off Harlingen. Her crew were rescued. She was on a voyage from London to Harlingen.
Southwick	United Kingdom	The ship was driven ashore between Rye, Sussex and Dungeness, Kent.
Unanimity	United Kingdom	The ship was driven ashore near Wainfleet.
Waterford	United Kingdom	The ship was driven ashore near Wainfleet.

== 11 January ==
List of shipwrecks: 11 January 1841
Ship	State	Description
Aberdeenshire	United Kingdom	The ship ran aground on the Corton Sand, in the North Sea off the coast of Suffolk. She was refloated and proceeded for Harwich, Essex.
Caroline	United Kingdom	The ship was driven ashore at Dolphin Point, Lincolnshire, at the mouth of the Humber.
George	United Kingdom	The sloop foundered in the North Sea off the mouth of the River Tees with the loss of all three crew. She was on a voyage from Newcastle upon Tyne, Northumberland to Hull, Yorkshire.
John	United Kingdom	The ship ran aground at Breaksea Point, Glamorgan. She was refloated and taken into Cardiff for repairs.
Pomona	(United Kingdom of Great Britain and Ireland) Jersey	The ship was in collision with John Bentley and foundered off The Smalls. Her crew were rescued by John Bentley. Pomona was on a voyage from Bahia, Brazil to Liverpool, Lancashire.

== 12 January ==
List of shipwrecks: 12 January 1841
Ship	State	Description
Active	United Kingdom	The ship ran aground on the Sheringham Knowl, in the North Sea off the coast of Norfolk.
Brack	United Kingdom	The ship ran aground on the Sheringham Knowl. She was on a voyage from Newcastle upon Tyne, Northumberland to London. Brack was refloated and resumed her voyage.
Clifton	United Kingdom	The ship was wrecked 7 nautical miles (13 km) south of Ravenglass, Cumberland. Her crew were rescued. She was on a voyage from Dalhousie, New Brunswick, British North America to Lancaster, Lancashire.
Danube	United Kingdom	The brig was wrecked near Royan, Charente-Maritime, France. Her crew were rescued. She was on a voyage from Sunderland, County Durham to Bordeaux, Gironde, France.

== 13 January ==
List of shipwrecks: 13 January 1841
Ship	State	Description
Anna Susanna	Netherlands	The ship departed from Surinam for Amsterdam, North Holland. No further trace, presumed foundered with the loss of all hands.
François	France	The ship was wrecked on Eierland, North Holland, Netherlands. Her crew were rescued. She was on a voyage from Newcastle upon Tyne, Northumberland, United Kingdom to Port-Vendres, Pyrénées-Orientales.
Pearl	United States	The brig was driven ashore and wrecked on Saint Kitts.
Rapid	United Kingdom	The ship was wrecked on a reef in the Pacific Ocean. All on board were rescued. She was on a voyage from Port Jackson, New South Wales to China.

== 14 January ==
List of shipwrecks: 14 January 1841
Ship	State	Description
Anne	United Kingdom	The ship was driven against the quayside and severely damaged by a high tide at Seaham, County Durham. She was taken into North Shields for repairs.
Crown	United Kingdom	The ship ran aground on the Herd Sand, in the North Sea off the coast of County Durham. She was later refloated.
Ebenezer	United Kingdom	The ship ran aground at Cardiff, Glamorgan. She was on a voyage from Cardiff to Naples, Kingdom of the Two Sicilies.
Halcyon	United Kingdom	The ship was set afire and damaged at North Sunderland, County Durham.
Hebe	United Kingdom	The ship ran aground on the Herd Sand. She was refloated on 16 January.
Moy	United Kingdom	The ship was driven ashore at Toward Point, Argyllshire. She was on a voyage from Ballina, County Mayo to Glasgow, Renfrewshire. Moy was refloated on 16 January and taken into Rothesay, Bute for repairs.
Permanent	United Kingdom	The ship ran aground off the coast of Essex. She was on a voyage from Southwold, Suffolk to London. She was refloated and put into Burnham-on-Crouch, Essex.
Severn	United Kingdom	The ship was driven ashore at Grimsby, Lincolnshire. She was later refloated.
Sunderland	United Kingdom	The dredger was driven out to sea from Sunderland, County Durham. She was towed into Hartlepool, County Durham tomorrow.

== 15 January ==
List of shipwrecks: 15 January 1841
Ship	State	Description
Broad Oak	United Kingdom	The ship was driven ashore near Mockbeggar, Cheshire. She was on a voyage from Bahia, Brazil to Liverpool, Lancashire. Broad Oak was refloated on 17 January and taken into Liverpool.
Eliza	United Kingdom	The sloop sank at The Mumbles, Glamorgan. Her crew were rescued.
Perseverance	United Kingdom	The ship was driven ashore and wrecked at Staintondale, Yorkshire with the loss of a crew member. She was on a voyage from Leith, Lothian to London.

== 16 January ==
List of shipwrecks: 16 January 1841
Ship	State	Description
Ramier	France	The brig was driven ashore between Marazion and Penzance, Cornwall, United Kingdom. Her crew were rescued. She was on a voyage from Marseille, Bouches-du-Rhône to Rouen, Seine-Inférieure.
Rose	United Kingdom	The ship was in collision with a steamship and was consequently beached at New Brighton, Cheshire. She was on a voyage from Liverpool, Lancashire to Larne, County Antrim. She was refloated.
Wilhelmine Lucia	Netherlands	The ship ran aground on the Haaks Bank, in the North Sea. She was on a voyage from Batavia, Netherlands East Indies to Amsterdam, North Holland. Wilhelmine Lucia was refloated on 18 January and taken into the Nieuw Diep.

== 17 January ==
List of shipwrecks: 17 January 1841
Ship	State	Description
Atalanta	United Kingdom	The ship was severely damaged by ice in the River Wear.
Barbara	United Kingdom	The ship was damaged by ice in the River Wear.
Beatitude	United Kingdom	The brig was driven out to sea from the River Wear by ice. She was taken into Seaham, County Durham the next day.
Benton	United Kingdom	The ship was damaged by ice in the River Wear.
Boreas	United Kingdom	The ship was severely damaged by ice in the River Wear.
Borough	United Kingdom	The ship was damaged by ice in the River Wear.
Coajutor	United Kingdom	The ship was severely damaged by ice in the River Wear.
Deux Amis	France	The crewless ship was driven out to sea from the River Wear by ice. She was taken into Seaham the next day.
Earl Durham	United Kingdom	The steamship was sunk by ice in the River Wear.
Effort	United Kingdom	The ship was sunk by ice in the River Wear.
Eleanor	United Kingdom	The ship was severely damaged by ice in the River Wear.
Elizabeth	United Kingdom	The ship was run into by a canal boat and sank at Upton Bridge, Worcestershire. She was on a voyage from Lydney, Gloucestershire to Worcester.
Elizabeth	United Kingdom	The ship was severely damaged by ice in the River Wear.
Epsilon	United Kingdom	The ship was severely damaged by ice in the River Wear.
Era	United Kingdom	The ship was driven out to sea from the River Wear with only the ship's dog on board.
Farnacres	United Kingdom	The ship was damaged by ice in the River Wear.
Favourite	United Kingdom	The ship was severely damaged by ice in the River Wear.
Felicité	France	The ship was wrecked by ice in the River Wear.
Gamma	United Kingdom	The ship was driven out to sea from the River Wear with only a boy on board. She was subsequently taken into Hartlepool, County Durham.
George and Ann	United Kingdom	The paddle steamer was sunk by ice in the River Wear.
Hare	United Kingdom	The paddle steamer was driven out to sea by ice in the River Wear. She came ashore at Sunderland, County Durham and was wrecked.
Hiram	United Kingdom	The ship was severely damaged by ice in the River Wear.
Hythe	United Kingdom	The brig sprang a leak and foundered in the North Sea between St. Abbs Head and Eyemouth, Berwickshire. Her seven crew were rescued by fishing boats from Eyemouth. She was on a voyage from Stockton-on-Tees, County Durham to Rochester, Kent.
Jane	United Kingdom	The ship was severely damaged by ice and sank at Sunderland, County Durham.
Jane	United Kingdom	Captain Craike's ship was damaged by ice at Sunderland.
Jane Isabella	United Kingdom	The ship was damaged by ice in the River Wear.
Jantina	Netherlands	The ship was wrecked by ice in the River Wear.
Jean	United Kingdom	The ship was driven out to sea from the River Wear. No further trace.
John and Richard	United Kingdom	The ship was damaged by ice in the River Wear.
Kent	United Kingdom	The ship was severely damaged by ice in the River Wear.
Kirton	United Kingdom	The ship was sunk by ice in the River Wear.
Leader	United Kingdom	The ship was wrecked in the Turks Islands. She was on a voyage from Saint Andrews, New Brunswick, British North America to Jamaica.
Mars	United Kingdom	The ship was abandoned in the North Sea 25 nautical miles (46 km) east south east of Tynemouth, Northumberland. Her crew were rescued by the brig George (United Kingdom).
Mary Tiffin	United Kingdom	The ship was damaged by ice in the River Wear.
Newby	United Kingdom	The brig capsized and was severely damaged by ice in the River Wear with the loss of one of her eight crew. She subsequently became a wreck.
Neptune	United Kingdom	The paddle tug was severely damaged by ice in the River Wear.
Novel	United Kingdom	The ship was severely damaged by ice in the River Wear.
Ovis	United Kingdom	The ship was damaged by ice in the River Wear.
Petrel	United Kingdom	The ship was severely damaged by ice in the River Wear.
Pilgrim	United Kingdom	The brig was sunk by ice in the River Wear.
Preston	United Kingdom	The ship was damaged by ice in the River Wear.
Prince Albert	United Kingdom	The paddle tug was sunk by ice in the River Wear.
Queen Victoria	United Kingdom	The ship was severely damaged by ice in the River Wear.
Resolution	United Kingdom	The ship was damaged by ice in the River Wear.
Resource	United Kingdom	The ship was severely damaged by ice in the River Wear.
Rosebud	United Kingdom	The ship was wrecked by ice in the River Wear.
Safety	United Kingdom	The paddle tug was sunk by ice in the River Wear.
Sunderland Packet	United Kingdom	The ship was severely damaged by ice in the River Wear.
Swift	United Kingdom	The ship was severely damaged by ice in the River Wear.
Tyro	United Kingdom	The ship was damaged by ice in the River Wear.
Valiant	United Kingdom	The ship was damaged by ice in the River Wear.
Virgil	United Kingdom	The ship was damaged by ice in the River Wear.
Waverley	United Kingdom	The ship was damaged by ice at Sunderland.
William Henry	United Kingdom	The ship was sunk by ice in the River Wear.
Young Wilson	United Kingdom	The brig was driven out to sea from the River Wear by ice. She was taken into Seaham the next day.

== 18 January ==
List of shipwrecks: 18 January 1841
Ship	State	Description
Cato	United Kingdom	The ship was driven out of port and abandoned in the North Sea. She was subsequently taken into Sunderland, County Durham on 20 January.
Holland	Netherlands	The ship was wrecked on the North Haaks Bank, in the North Sea. She was on a voyage from Batavia, Netherlands East Indies to Amsterdam, North Holland.
Skelliften	Sweden	The ship was driven ashore near "Tragoe Hafen". She was on a voyage from Boston, Massachusetts, United States to Stockholm.
Venus	United Kingdom	The ship was driven ashore at Kilroot Point, County Antrim.

== 19 January ==
List of shipwrecks: 19 January 1841
Ship	State	Description
Clio	Belgium	The ship ran aground on the Paardemarkt Bank, in the North Sea off the coast of West Flanders. Her crew were rescued. She was on a voyage from Málaga, Spain to Antwerp. Clio was refloated but ran aground off Knokke. She was refloated and taken into Ostend, where she sank.
Friends	United Kingdom	The ship was driven ashore near Strum Head, Wales. Her crew were rescued.
Janet	United Kingdom	The ship sank at Hartlepool, County Durham.
Margaret	United Kingdom	The ship was wrecked at Dulas, Anglesey. She was on a voyage from Liverpool, Lancashire to St. Ubes, Portugal and the River Plate.
Margaret and Jane	United Kingdom	The ship ran aground and sank at Banff, Aberdeenshire.
Osceola	United States	The brig sprang a leak and was abandoned in the Atlantic Ocean. Her crew were rescued by Tyrone (United Kingdom). Osceola was on a voyage from Charleston, South Carolina to Liverpool.

== 20 January ==
List of shipwrecks: 20 January 1841
Ship	State	Description
Andrews	United Kingdom	The ship foundered in the North Sea off the coast of Yorkshire.
Gleaner	United Kingdom	The ship was driven ashore 6 nautical miles (11 km) west of Fishguard, Pembrokeshire. Her crew were rescued.
Jeune Henri	Belgium	The ship was holed by floating ice and sank in the Scheldt near Lillo. She was on a voyage from London, United Kingdom to Antwerp. Jeune Henri was refloated and beached. She arrived at Antwerp on 3 February for repairs.
John	United Kingdom	The ship ran aground and was severely damaged at Shoreham-by-Sea, Sussex.
Mary Ann	United Kingdom	The ship foundered in the North Sea off the coast of Yorkshire.
Rothesay	United Kingdom	The brig was wrecked on a reef off New Providence, Bahamas. She was on a voyage from Glasgow, Renfrewshire to Havana, Cuba.
Venezuela	United States	The brig was wrecked on the Bocas. She was on a voyage from Trinidad to La Guaira, Venezuela.
Young	United Kingdom	The ship foundered in the North Sea off the coast of Yorkshire.

== 21 January ==
List of shipwrecks: 21 January 1841
Ship	State	Description
Accélére	France	The ship was wrecked at Philippeville, Algeria.
Adolphe	France	The ship was wrecked at Philippeville.
Alfred et Delie	France	The ship was wrecked at Philippeville.
Balthazar	France	The ship was wrecked at Philippeville.
Chamcook	United Kingdom	The ship was driven ashore near Ballywater, County Wexford. She was on a voyage from Messina, Sicily to Liverpool, Lancashire. She was refloated and arrived at Liverpool on 23 January.
Eliza	United Kingdom	The ship was driven ashore near "Swimmeno". She was on a voyage from St. Ives, Cornwall to Ancona, Papal States.
Émélie	France	The ship was wrecked at Philippeville.
Hirondelle	France	The ship was wrecked at Philippeville.
Jeune Clemène	France	The ship was wrecked at Philippeville.
Jules Felix	France	The ship was wrecked at Philippeville.
Justa	Spain	The ship was driven ashore in the Bay of Cádiz. She was on a voyage from New York, United States to Cádiz.
Marne	French Navy	The corvette was wrecked at Phillippeville with the loss of 57 of her crew.
Mathilde	France	The ship was wrecked at Philippeville.
Messager de Syrie	France	The ship was wrecked at Philippeville.
Minerva	United Kingdom	The ship struck a sunken rock and sank off Rasvåg, Norway with the loss of nine of the fourteen people on board. She was on a voyage from Hull, Yorkshire to Wismar.
Nouveau Théodore	France	The ship was wrecked at Philippeville.
Octavie	France	The ship was wrecked at Philippeville.
Tiber	France	The ship was driven ashore and wrecked at Algiers, Algeria.

== 22 January ==
List of shipwrecks: 22 January 1841
Ship	State	Description
Alphonse	France	The ship was driven ashore near Ambleteuse, Pas-de-Calais. She was on a voyage from Havre de Grâce, Seine-Inférieure to Antwerp, Belgium
Commerce	United Kingdom	The schooner was driven ashore and wrecked at Bideford, Devon with the loss of all hands.
Euphrates	France	The ship departed from Toulon, Var for Algiers, Algeria. No further trace, presumed foundered with the loss of all hands.
Julius	Portugal	The ship was driven ashore near Ambleteuse.
Najaden	Norway	The ship was driven ashore and damaged at Valderøy. Her crew were rescued. She was refloated on 21 February and taken into Tanager.
Robert	United Kingdom	The ship was destroyed by fire in the North Sea 5 nautical miles (9.3 km) east by south the Dudgeon Lightship ( Trinity House).
Royal Frederick	United Kingdom	The ship was driven ashore whilst on a voyage from Portsmouth, Hampshire to London. She was refloated and taken into Whitstable, Kent.
Zephyr	United Kingdom	The schooner was run down off the Wolf Rock, Cornwall by T. H. Adami (United States). Her crew were rescued. She was on a voyage from Larache, Morocco to Dublin. Zephyr was towed into Falmouth, Cornwall by Josephine (United Kingdom). She arrived on 28 January.

== 23 January ==
List of shipwrecks: 23 January 1841
Ship	State	Description
Cecilia	United Kingdom	The ship departed from Mauritius for Calcutta, India. No further trace, presumed foundered in the Indian Ocean with the loss of all hands.
Eden or Ellen	United Kingdom	The schooner sprang a leak and foundered in the North Sea 40 nautical miles (74 km) east of Aberdeen. Her crew were rescued by Esker (United Kingdom).
Hunter, and Robert	United Kingdom	The ships collided and sank in the North Sea off the Inner Dowsing Lightship ( Trinity House). Both crews were rescued by Halifax (United Kingdom). Hunter was on a voyage from London to Sunderland, County Durham, Robert was on a voyage from Goole, Yorkshire to London.
Patsey or Rothesay	United Kingdom	The ship was wrecked on the Caicos Reef. Her crew were rescued. She was on a voyage from Havana, Cuba to the Clyde.
Sir Edward Banks	United Kingdom	The paddle steamer ran aground off Goeree, Zeeland, Netherlands. She was refloated on 27 February and towed into Hellevoetsluis, Zeeland by William Joliffe (United Kingdom).
Tory	United Kingdom	The ship was wrecked on the Half Moon Shoal, in the Palewan Passage. She was abandoned two days later. Tory was on a voyage from Singapore to China.

== 24 January ==
List of shipwrecks: 24 January 1841
Ship	State	Description
Ellen	United Kingdom	The sloop foundered in the North Sea off Theddlethorpe, Lincolnshire. Her crew survived. Ellen was on a voyage from the Humber to King's Lynn, Norfolk.
Henry Cotes	United Kingdom	The brig ran aground on the Gunfleet Sand, in the North Sea off the coast of Essex. She was on a voyage from Blyth, Northumberland to London. Henry Cotes was refloated the next day with the assistance of four smacks.
Mariner	United Kingdom	The ship ran aground on the Herd Sand, in the North Sea off the coast of County Durham. Her crew were rescued by the North Shields Lifeboat. A crew member of Advance (United Kingdom) was lost attempting to rescue the crew of Mariner.
Morgan	United Kingdom	The ship struck the Beacon Rock, off Puffin Island, Anglesey and foundered. Her crew were rescued. She was on a voyage from Pwllheli, Caernarfonshire to Liverpool, Lancashire.
Star	United Kingdom	The schooner was abandoned in the North Sea off Southwold, Suffolk. Her crew were rescued. She was on a voyage from Great Yarmouth, Norfolk to Sunderland, County Durham.

== 25 January ==
List of shipwrecks: 25 January 1841
Ship	State	Description
Esk	United Kingdom	The brig ran aground on the Gunfleet Sand, in the North Sea off the coast of Essex. She was on a voyage from Stockton-on-Tees, County Durham to London. Esk was refloated the next day with assistance from three smacks.
Fanny	United Kingdom	The schooner was wrecked on the Mixon Sands, in the Bristol Channel. Her three crew were rescued. She was on a voyage from Newport, Monmouthshire to Bideford, Devon.
Jenny	United Kingdom	The sloop sprang a leak and was abandoned in the English Channel 50 nautical miles (93 km) off St. Alban's Head, Dorset. Her crew were rescuedby Orient (United Kingdom). Jenny was on a voyage from Eden, County Antrim to Newcastle upon Tyne, Northumberland.
Louise	France	The ship ran aground on a reef off Key West, Florida Territory. Her crew were rescued. She was on a voyage from New Orleans, Louisiana to Havana, Cuba and Bordeaux, Gironde. Louise was refloated on 29 January and taken into Key West, where she was condemned.
Monkey	Belgium	The ship was driven ashore 15 nautical miles (28 km) east of Ostend, West Flanders. Her crew were rescued. She was on a voyage from Saint Domingo to Antwerp.

== 26 January ==
List of shipwrecks: 26 January 1841
Ship	State	Description
Acheron	France	The ship departed from Algiers, Algeria. No further trace, presumed foundered with the loss of all hands.
Caroline	(United Kingdom of Great Britain and Ireland) Grenada	The cutter was wrecked on a reef in Bacolet Bay.
Fanny	United Kingdom	The ship struck the Mixon Sand, in the Bristol Channel and sank. Her crew were rescued. She was on a voyage from Newport, Monmouthshire to Bideford, Devon.
Merchant	United Kingdom	The brig ran aground on the Gunfleet Sand, in the North Sea off the coast of Essex and was abandoned. She was later refloated and taken into Harwich.
Renard	France	The ship was driven ashore and wrecked near St Alban's Head, Dorset, United Kingdom. SHe was on a voyage from Havre de Grâce, Seine-Inférieure, France to Pernambuco, Brazil.

== 27 January ==
List of shipwrecks: 27 January 1841
Ship	State	Description
Beaseley	United Kingdom	The ship was driven ashore at Port Talbot, Glamorgan.
Bristol Packet	United Kingdom	The sloop was driven ashore at Port Talbot and was abandoned by her crew. She subsequently became a wreck. Bristol Packet was on a voyage from Plymouth, Devon to Bristol, Gloucestershire.
Justine	Denmark	The ship ran aground at "Shipshaven". She was later refloated and taken into port.
Ocean	United Kingdom	The paddle steamer ran aground at Goedereede, South Holland, Netherlands. She was on a voyage from London to Rotterdam, South Holland.
Royal Mint	United Kingdom	The ship ran aground off Cabaritta Point, Jamaica. She was on a voyage from Morant Bay to Salt River. She was refloated on 29 January and taken into Salt River.
Vierge Marie	France	The ship was driven ashore at Marseille, Bouches-du-Rhône with the loss of her captain. She was on a voyage from Marseille to Alicante, Spain and Antwerp, Belgium.

== 28 January ==
List of shipwrecks: 28 January 1841
Ship	State	Description
Daniel	Portugal	The ship was driven ashore in the River Avon. She was on a voyage from Bristol, Gloucestershire, United Kingdom to Gloucester. She was refloated the next day and completed her voyage.
Vesper	United Kingdom	The collier, a brig, was in collision with Argus (United Kingdom) and sank in the River Thames at Northfleet, Kent. The wreck was dispersed by explosives in July 1842.

== 29 January ==
List of shipwrecks: 29 January 1841
Ship	State	Description
Isabella	United Kingdom	The ship was driven ashore at Point de Galle, Ceylon. She was on a voyage from Galle, Ceylon to London.
Prima	(United Kingdom of Great Britain and Ireland) Jersey	The ship was run down in the English Channel by a steamship. Her crew were rescued. She was subsequently taken into Jersey.

== 30 January ==
List of shipwrecks: 30 January 1841
Ship	State	Description
Albion	United Kingdom	The ship ran aground at Tabasco, Mexico.
Britannia	United Kingdom	The schooner was driven ashore near Delfzijl, Groningen, Netherlands. She was on a voyage from Hull, Yorkshire to Leer, Kingdom of Hanover.
Industry	United Kingdom	The ship ran aground on the Brake Sand, in the North Sea off the coast of Essex. She consequently sank off Sandown Castle, Kent. Her crew were rescued. Industry was on a voyage from Harwich, Essex to Portsmouth, Hampshire.
Isabella	United Kingdom	The barque was wrecked on a reef in the Caroline Islands. Her crew reached Manila, Spanish East Indies in her long boats.
John and Mary	(United Kingdom of Great Britain and Ireland) Isle of Man	The smack was driven against the pier and severely damaged at Peel.
New Volunteer	(United Kingdom of Great Britain and Ireland) Isle of Man	The smack was wrecked at Douglas. Her crew were rescued.
Vesta	United Kingdom	The barque collided with the brig Sarah and sank in the River Thames at Gravesend, Kent.

== 31 January ==
List of shipwrecks: 31 January 1841
Ship	State	Description
Betsey	(United Kingdom of Great Britain and Ireland) Isle of Man	The ship was run down and sunk off Ailsa Craig by Lune (United Kingdom). Her crew were rescued. She was on a voyage from Liverpool, Lancashire to Gloucester.
Helen	United Kingdom	The ship ran aground on the Swash, in the Bristol Channel. She was on a voyage from Bristol, Gloucestershire to Jamaica. She was refloated on 3 February and resumed her voyage.
Nancy	United States	The schooner was wrecked off Georgetown, South Carolina.

== Unknown date ==
List of shipwrecks: Unknown date in January 1841
Ship	State	Description
Ann Eliza	United Kingdom	The ship was driven ashore in West Angle Bay, Pembrokeshire. She was refloated on 27 January and taken into Milford Haven, Pembrokeshire.
Brothers	United Kingdom	The ship foundered in the North Sea off the coast of Suffolk on or before 17 January with some loss of life.
Christina	United Kingdom	The ship was wrecked at Saint Domingo.
Economy	United Kingdom	The brig was abandoned in the Atlantic Ocean before 11 January.
Eliza Ellen	(United Kingdom of Great Britain and Ireland) British North America	The ship was wrecked on Devils Island, Nova Scotia. Her crew were rescued. She was on a voyage from Canso to Halifax.
H.T.M.	United Kingdom	The brig was abandoned in the Atlantic Ocean before 16 January.
Irene	United States	The ship was wrecked near Stockholm, Sweden before 8 January. She was on a voyage from Stockholm to New York.
Isabella	United Kingdom	The ship departed from South Shields in late January for a Scottish port. Presumed foundered with the loss of all hands; a boat from the vessel came ashore at Craster, Caithness on 9 February.
James Andas	United Kingdom	The ship was driven ashore at Kåseberga, Sweden. She was on a voyage from Saint Petersburg, Russia to Hull, Yorkshire. James Andas was refloated and taken into Ystad for repairs.
New Felicity	United Kingdom	The schooner foundered in the Bristol Channel before 24 January.
Philestrus	United Kingdom	The ship was wrecked in Dundrum Bay with the loss of nineteen of her 22 crew. She was on a voyage from New Orleans, Louisiana, United States to Greenock, Renfrewshire.
Phœbus	United Kingdom	The ship foundered in the Atlantic Ocean. All on board were rescued. She was on a voyage from Saint Thomas, Virgin Islands to Halifax.
Prince Regent	United Kingdom	The sloop was wrecked at the mouth of the River Towy before 21 January with the loss of all hands. She was on a voyage from Llanelly, Glamorgan to Milford Haven, Pembrokeshire.
Sarah	United Kingdom	The sloop sank off Grimsby, Lincolnshire. She was refloated on 20 January and taken into Grimsby in a severely damaged condition.
Tonkea	France	The ship was driven ashore near Rye, Sussex, United Kingdom. She was on a voyage from Harfleur, Seine-Inférieure to Sunderland, County Durham, United Kingdom. Tonkea was refloated on 16 January and taken into Rye.
Victoria	United Kingdom	The ship was driven ashore at the River Tay. She was on a voyage from Newcastle upon Tyne, Northumberland to Arbroath, Forfarshire. Victoria was refloated on 13 January and taken into Dundee, Forfarshire.
