= Silver River =

Silver River may refer to:

== Streams ==
=== United States ===
- Silver River (Florida)
- Silver River (Baraga County), Michigan
- Silver River (Baraga–Houghton counties), Michigan
- Silver River (Keweenaw County), Michigan

=== Elsewhere ===
- Big Silver Creek, also known as Silver River, British Columbia, Canada
- Silver River (Grenada)
- Silver River (Ireland)

== Other uses ==
- Silver River (film), a 1948 film starring Errol Flynn, with Ann Sheridan and Thomas Mitchell
- The Silver River, a 1997 chamber opera by Bright Sheng
- Silver River, a name of the Milky Way in East Asian languages
- "Silver River", a song by Gotthard from the 2017 album Silver

== See also ==
- Silver River in Spanish: Río de la Plata, a river of South America
- Silver River State Park, the former name of Silver Springs State Park in Florida
