= Soigné =

Restaurant in Bussum, Netherlands

- Interactive map of Soigné

Restaurant information
- Established: 2006
- Head chef: Dennis Jong
- Food type: French, Mediterranean
- Rating: Michelin Guide
- Location: Kapelstraat 16, Bussum, 1404 HX, Netherlands
- Coordinates: 52°16′28.19″N 5°9′52.56″E
- Website: Official website (in Dutch)

Restaurant Soigné is a restaurant in Bussum, Netherlands. It is a fine dining restaurant that was awarded one Michelin star in 2010 and has retained that rating until the present.

In 2013, GaultMillau awarded the restaurant 13 out of 20 points.

The head chef of Soigné is Dennis Jong, former senior sous chef of La Rive. The maître is Frank Velthuyse. They have owned the restaurant since 2007.

The restaurant is located in a building that formerly housed the restaurant Negliche. This restaurant was in 2006 sold to Sidney Heinze, former head chef of Tante Koosje. Heinze changed the name of the restaurant in Soigné, but sold the restaurant a year later.

== See also ==
- List of Michelin-starred restaurants in the Netherlands
