= Loria =

Loria may refer to:

- Loria (surname), Italian surname

== Places ==
- Loria, Veneto, a town in the province of Treviso, northern Italy
- Loria (Buenos Aires Underground), a station on Line A of the Buenos Aires Underground
- River Loria, Grenada
- Sant Julià de Lòria, Andorra

== Other ==
- Loria, Formula 1 racing driver Sebastian Vettel's 2018 car (Ferrari SF71H)
- Loria, a computer science research laboratory located at the University of Lorraine
