= River of Little Marquis =

Coordinates: 12°01′N 61°40′W

Location
- Country: Grenada

The River of Little Marquis is a river of Grenada.

== See also ==
- List of rivers of Grenada
