= French ship Requin =

At least four ships of the French Navy have borne the name Requin:

- French ship Requin (1794), a cutter captured by the Royal Navy in 1795
- French privateer Requin, a musket-armed ship operating out of Dieppe during the French Revolution, captured by HM-Cutter Lion
- French brig Requin, a 16-gun brig-of-war captured by HMS Volage (1807) in 1808 during the Naopleonic Wars
- French ironclad Requin, a Terrible-class ironclad launched in 1885 and stricken in 1920
- French submarine Requin (1924), a Requin-class submarine launched in 1924 and sold for scrap in 1944
- French submarine Requin (S634), a Narval-class submarine completed in 1958 and stricken in 1985

== See also ==
- Requin-class submarine of the French Navy
- Requin (disambiguation)
