= Loria (surname) =

Loria is an Italian surname. Notable people with the surname include:

- Achille Loria (1867–1943), Italian Jewish economist and sociologist
- Christopher Loria (born 1960), American astronaut
- David Loria (born 1981), Kazakh football goalkeeper
- Frank Loria (1947–1970), American football player
- Gino Loria (1862–1954), Italian mathematician and historian of mathematics
- Giorgi Loria (born 1986), Georgian footballer
- Jeffrey Loria (born 1940), art dealer and baseball club owner
- Lamberto Loria (1855–1913), Italian ethnographer
- Leonardo Loria (born 1999), Italian footballer
- Mariano Sánchez de Loria (1774–1842), Bolivian statesman
- Marvin Loría (born 1997), Costa Rican footballer
- Simone Loria (born 1976), Italian footballer
- Vincenzo Loria (1850–1939), Italian painter

== See also ==
- Loria (disambiguation)
