= Saint Louis River (Grenada) =

Coordinates: 12°01′N 61°42′W

Location
- Country: Grenada

The Saint Louis River is a river of Grenada in the Caribbean Sea.

== See also ==
- List of rivers of Grenada
