= Calabasse River =

River in Grenada

Coordinates: 12°11′N 61°36′W

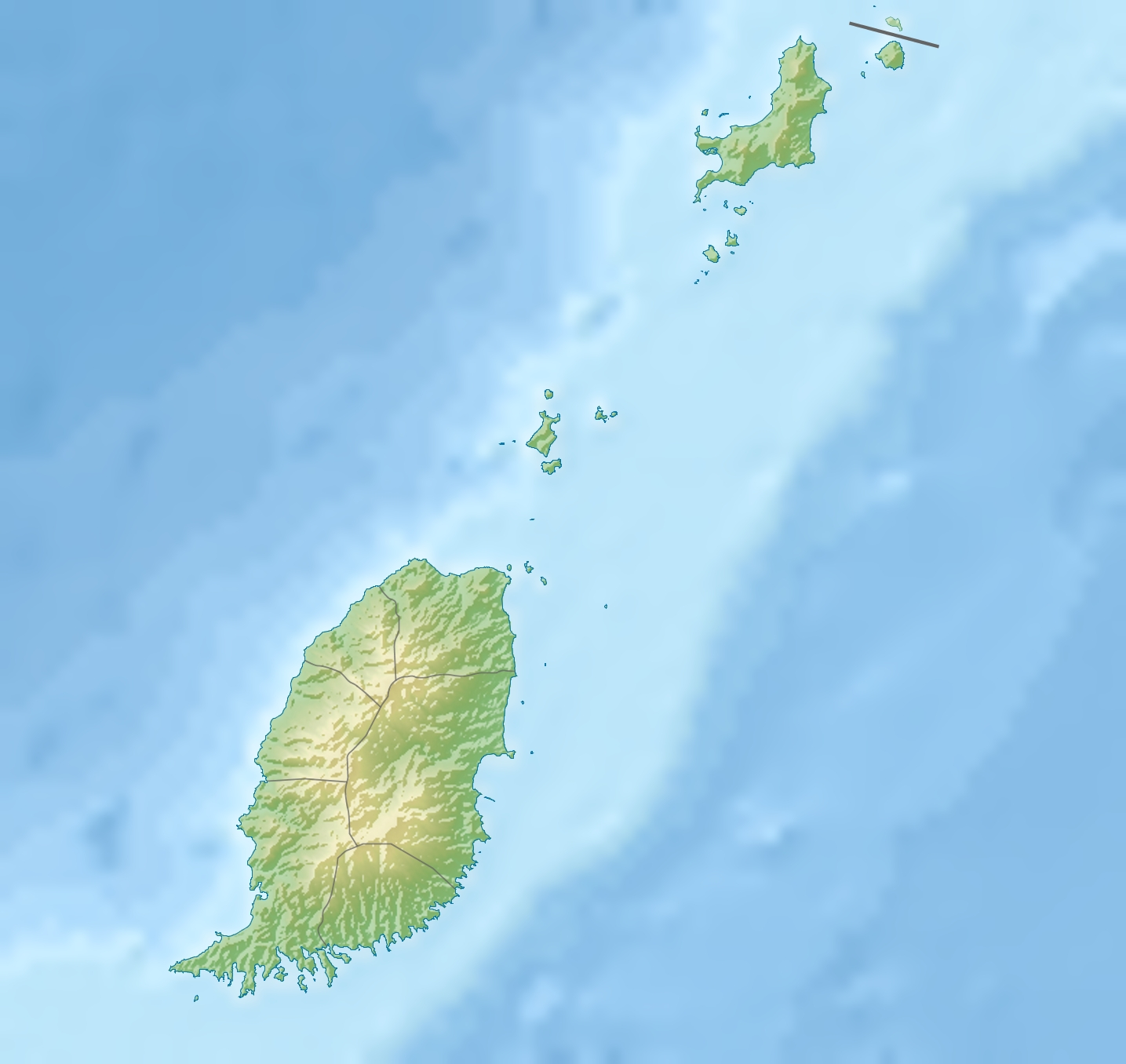
- Location of mouth

Location
- Country: Grenada

The Calabasse River is a river of Grenada.

== See also ==
- List of rivers of Grenada
