= River Simon =

River in Grenada

Coordinates: 12°08′N 61°36′W

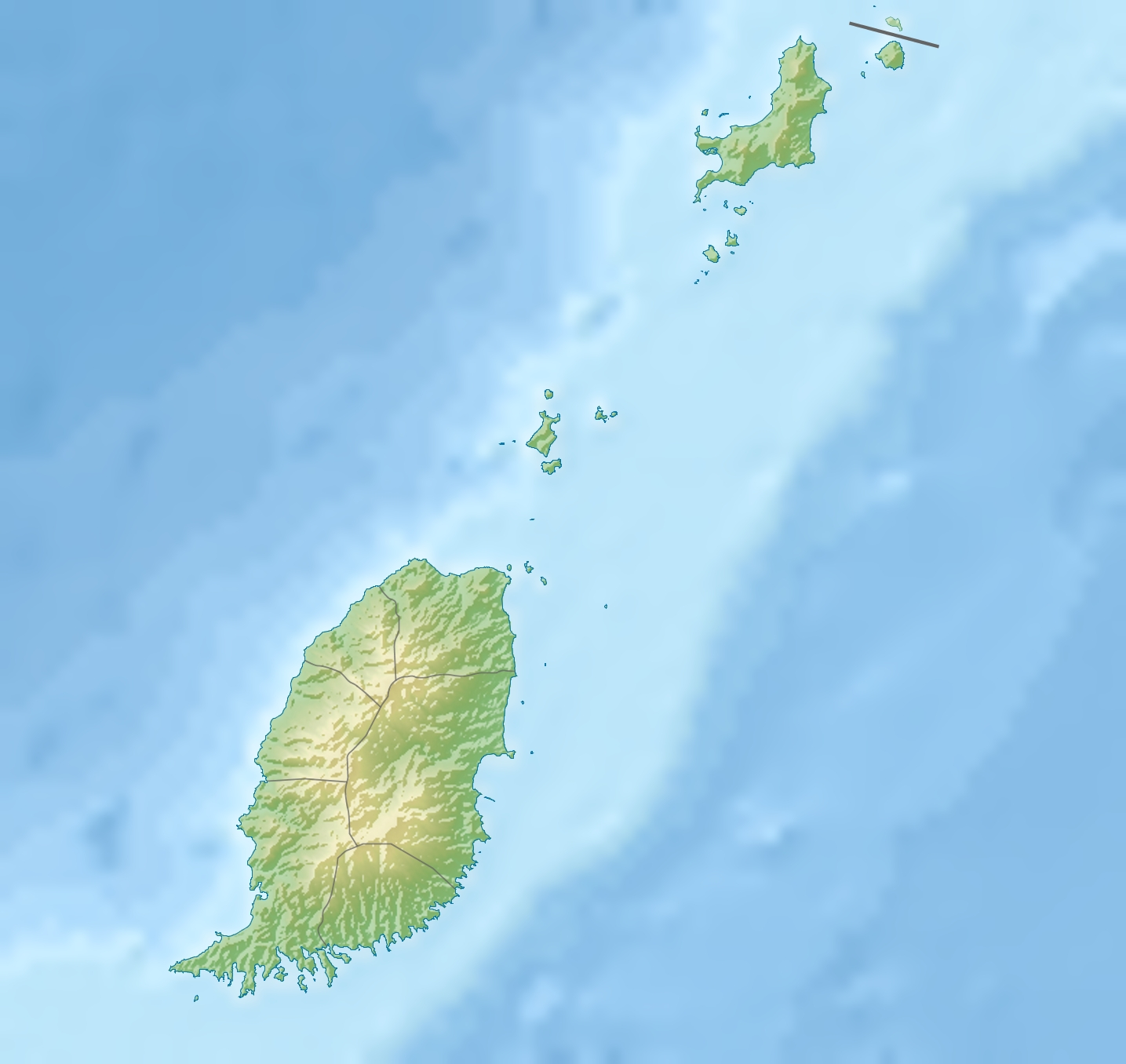
- Location of mouth

Location
- Country: Grenada

The River Simon is a river of Grenada in Saint Andrew Parish, Grenada.

== See also ==
- List of rivers of Grenada
