= List of rivers of Grenada =

This is a list of rivers of Grenada. Rivers in Grenada flow towards the Caribbean Sea, which surrounds the islands of Grenada. There are no rivers on the islands of Carriacou and Petite Martinique.

Rivers in Grenada
Name	Parish
Antoine River	Grenada
Balthazar River	Saint Andrew Parish
Beauséjour River	Saint George Parish
Black Bay River	Saint John Parish
Bon Accord River	Saint George Parish
Calabasse River	Saint Patrick Parish
Charlotte River	Saint John Parish
Chemin River	Grenada
River Claire	Saint Mark Parish
Crochu River	Saint Andrew Parish
Douce River	Grenada
Duquesne River	Grenada
Gaulier River	Saint Mark Parish
Gouyave River	Saint John Parish
Grand Bras River	Saint Andrew Parish
Grand Roy River	Saint John Parish
Great Arm River	Saint Patrick Parish
Great Arm	Saint John Parish
Great Crayfish River	Saint Mark Parish
Great Palmiste River	Saint John Parish
Great Ravine River	Saint Mark Parish
Great Requin River	Saint David Parish
Great River	Saint Andrew Parish
Great River of Grand Bacolet	Saint Andrew Parish
Grenville River	Saint Andrew Parish
La Chaussée River	Saint David Parish
La Tante River	Saint David Parish
Little Crayfish River	Saint Mark Parish
Marquis River	Saint Andrew Parish
Little Palmiste River	Saint John Parish
Little Requin River	Saint David Parish
Little River	Saint John Parish
Little River of Great Bacolet	Saint Andrew Parish
Little Saint Andrews River	Saint Andrew Parish
Little Saint Marks River	Saint Mark Parish
Little Saint Patrick River	Saint Patrick Parish
River Loria	Saint Andrew Parish
Maran River	Saint John Parish
Marquis River	Saint Andrew Parish
Menere River	Saint Andrew Parish
River Petit Bacaye	Saint David Parish
Red River	Saint John Parish
Saint Francis River	Saint Andrew Parish
Saint Johns River	Saint George Parish
Saint Louis River	Saint David Parish
Saint Marks River	Saint Mark Parish
Saint Patrick River	Saint Patrick Parish
Salle River (East Coast)	Saint Patrick Parish
Salle River (West Coast)	Saint Patrick Parish
River Saumache	Saint Mark Parish
Silver River	Saint Mark Parish
River Simon	Saint Andrew Parish
Tempé River	Saint George Parish

== See also ==
- Geography of Grenada
- Grenadines
- List of cities in Grenada
- List of islands of Grenada
- List of volcanoes in Grenada
- List of rivers of the Americas by coastline
- Parishes of Grenada
