= Little River (Grenada) =

Coordinates: 12°10′N 61°43′W

Location
- Country: Grenada

The Little River is a river of Grenada.

== See also ==
- List of rivers of Grenada
