= Little Saint Patrick River =

Coordinates: 12°13′N 61°39′W

Location
- Country: Grenada

The Little Saint Patrick River is a river of Grenada.

== See also ==
- List of rivers of Grenada
