= Little Saint Andrews River =

Coordinates: 12°06′N 61°37′W

Location
- Country: Grenada

The Little Saint Andrews River is a river of Grenada.

== See also ==
- List of rivers of Grenada
