= River Petit Bacaye =

Coordinates: 12°01′N 61°41′W

Location
- Country: Grenada

The River Petit Bacaye is a river of Grenada.

== See also ==
- List of rivers of Grenada
