= Salle River (East Coast) =

Location
- Country: Grenada

The Salle River (East Coast) is a river in Grenada.

== See also ==
- List of rivers of Grenada
