= La Chaussée River =

River in Grenada

Coordinates: 12°01′N 61°40′W

Location
- Country: Grenada

The La Chaussée River is a river of Grenada.

== See also ==
- List of rivers of Grenada
