= Great Ravine River =

Coordinates: 12°12′N 61°42′W

Location
- Country: Grenada

The Great Ravine River is a river of Grenada.

== See also ==
- List of rivers of Grenada
