= Crochu River =

River in Grenada

Coordinates: 12°03′N 61°38′W

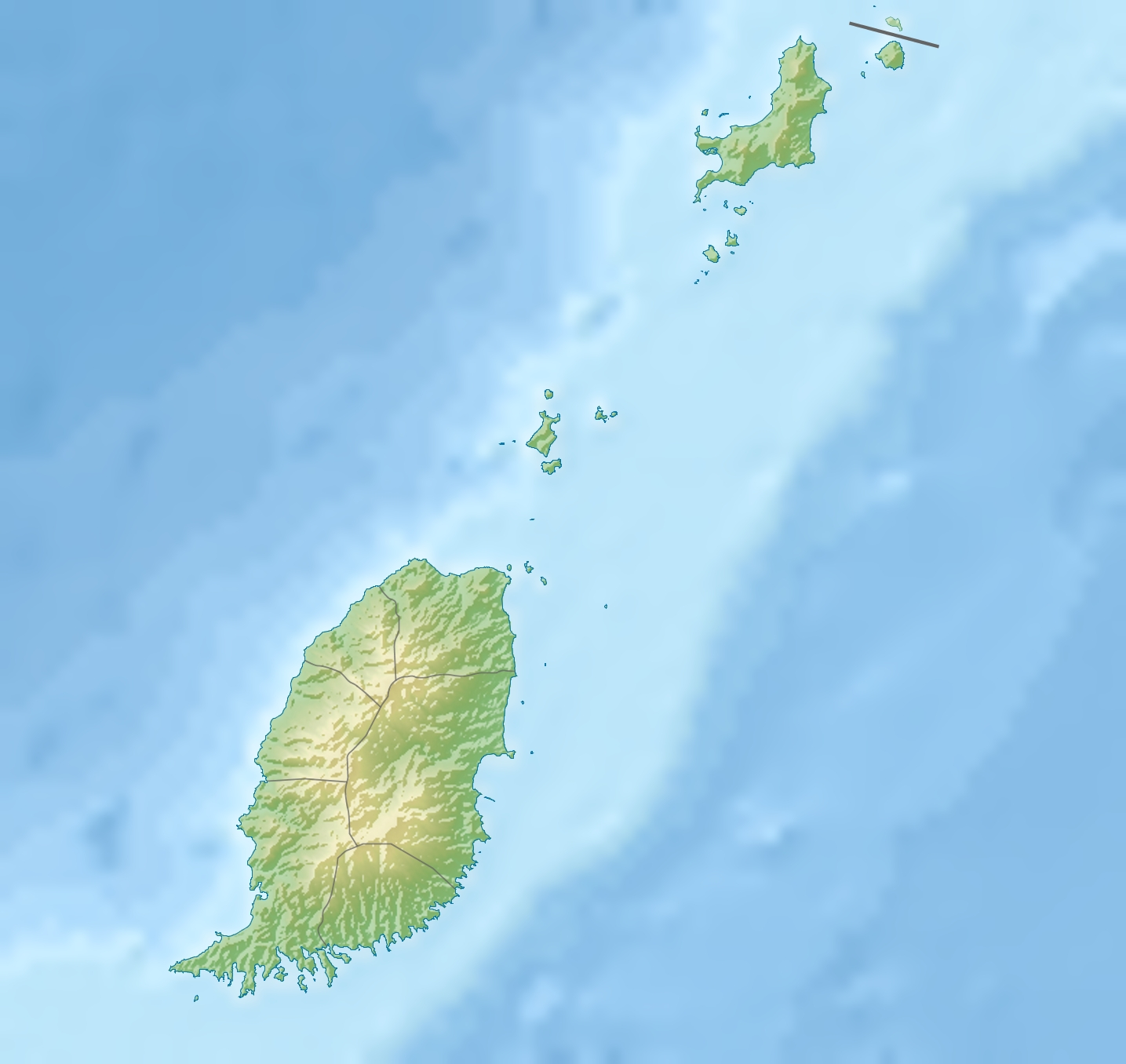
- Location of mouth

Location
- Country: Grenada

The Crochu River is a river of Grenada.

== See also ==
- List of rivers of Grenada
