= Gaulier River =

Coordinates: 12°11′N 61°43′W

Location
- Country: Grenada

The Gaulier River is a river of Grenada. This river is in the parish of Saint John.

== See also ==
- List of rivers of Grenada
