= River Saumache =

Coordinates: 12°10′N 61°41′W

Location
- Country: Grenada

The River Saumache is a river of Grenada.

== See also ==
- List of rivers of Grenada
