= Great River (Grenada) =

River in Grenada

Coordinates: 12°08′N 61°36′W

The Great River is the longest river on the island of Grenada. Its source is in the Grand Etang Forest Reserve. The river meets the Atlantic Ocean at the Great River Bay north of Grenville.

The Grand Etang, a crater lake, empties into a tributary of the Great River.

== See also ==
- List of rivers of Grenada
