= Great Arm River =

River in Grenada

Coordinates: 12°12′N 61°38′W

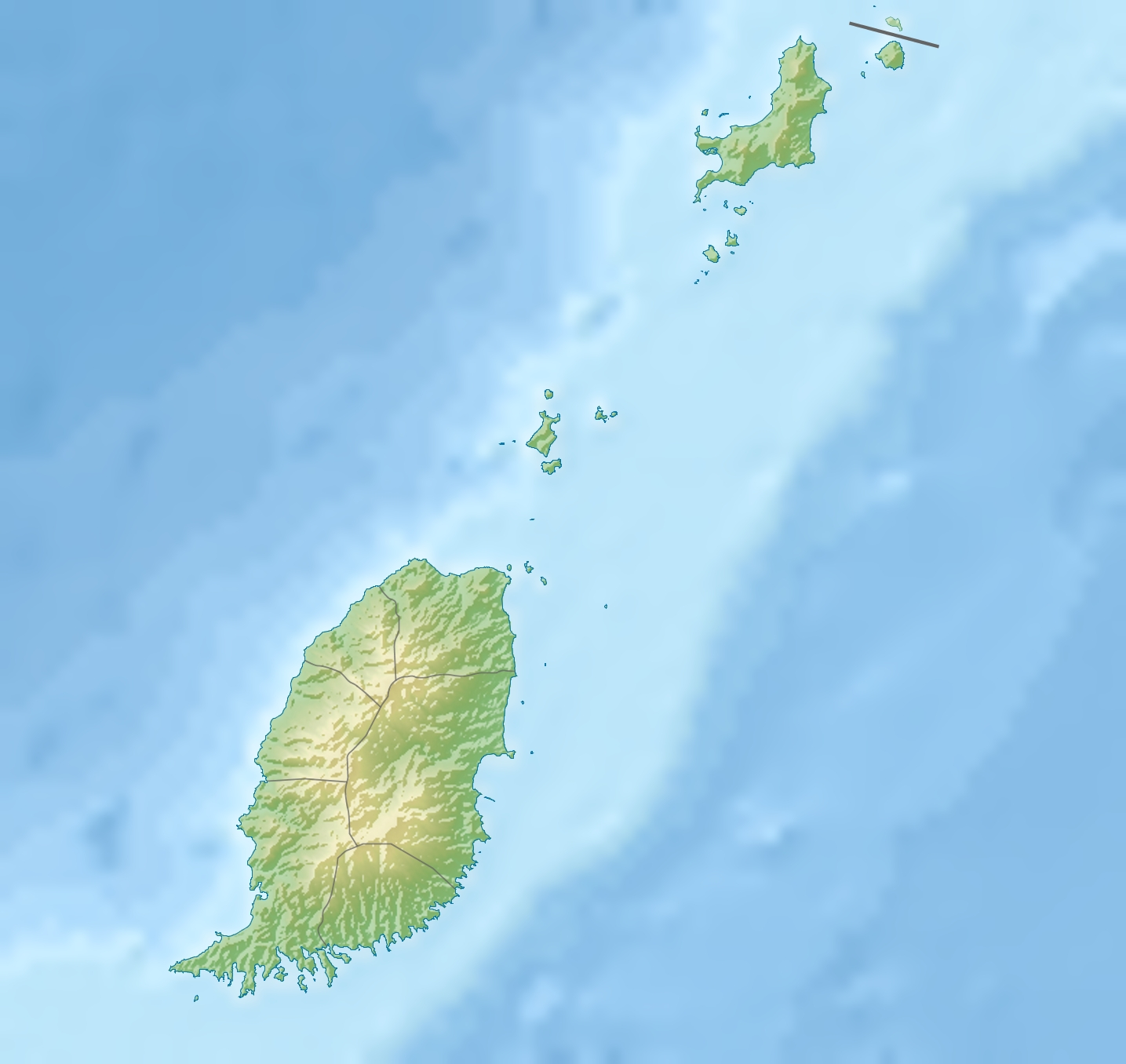
- Location of mouth

Location
- Country: Grenada

The Great Arm River is a river of Grenada.

== See also ==
- List of rivers of Grenada
