= Gaulier =

Gaulier is a surname. Notable people with the surname include:

== People ==
- Alfred Gaulier (1829–1898), French politician
- Géraldine Gaulier (born 1947), Swiss singer
- Philippe Gaulier (1943–2026), French clown and academic

== Other ==
- Gaulier River, a river in the parish of St. John, Grenada
