= Little Saint Marks River =

Coordinates: 12°12′N 61°42′W

Location
- Country: Grenada

The Little Saint Marks River is a river of Grenada.

== See also ==
- List of rivers of Grenada
