= Great Palmiste River =

Coordinates: 12°08′N 61°44′W

Location
- Country: Grenada

The Great Palmiste River is a river of Grenada. It's in the west part of the country, 9 kilometers north of Saint George.

== See also ==
- List of rivers of Grenada
