= Red River (Grenada) =

Coordinates: 12°10′N 61°42′W

Location
- Country: Grenada

The Red River is a river of Grenada.

== See also ==
- List of rivers of Grenada
