= River Claire (Grenada) =

River in Grenada

Coordinates: 12°11′N 61°42′W

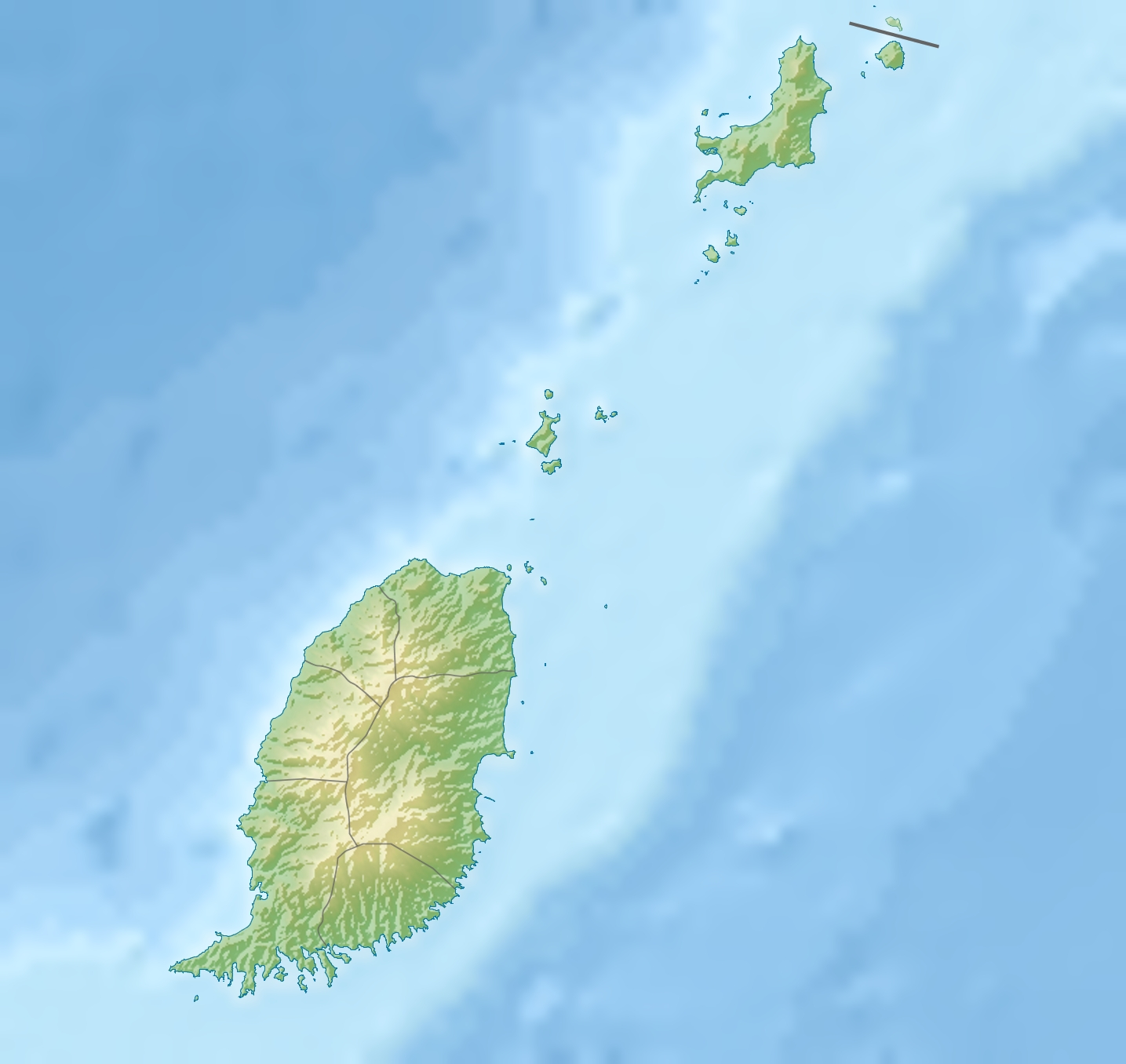
- Location of mouth

Location
- Country: Grenada

The River Claire is a river of Grenada. It is located in the smallest parish on the island, the Saint Mark Parish.

== See also ==
- List of rivers of Grenada
