= Grenville River =

Coordinates: 12°06′N 61°38′W

Location
- Country: Grenada

The Grenville River is a river of Grenada.

== See also ==
- List of rivers of Grenada
