= Marquis River (Grenada) =

Coordinates: 12°06′N 61°37′W

Location
- Country: Grenada

The Marquis River is a river of Grenada.

== See also ==
- List of rivers of Grenada
