= Duquesne River =

Coordinates: 12°13′N 61°40′W

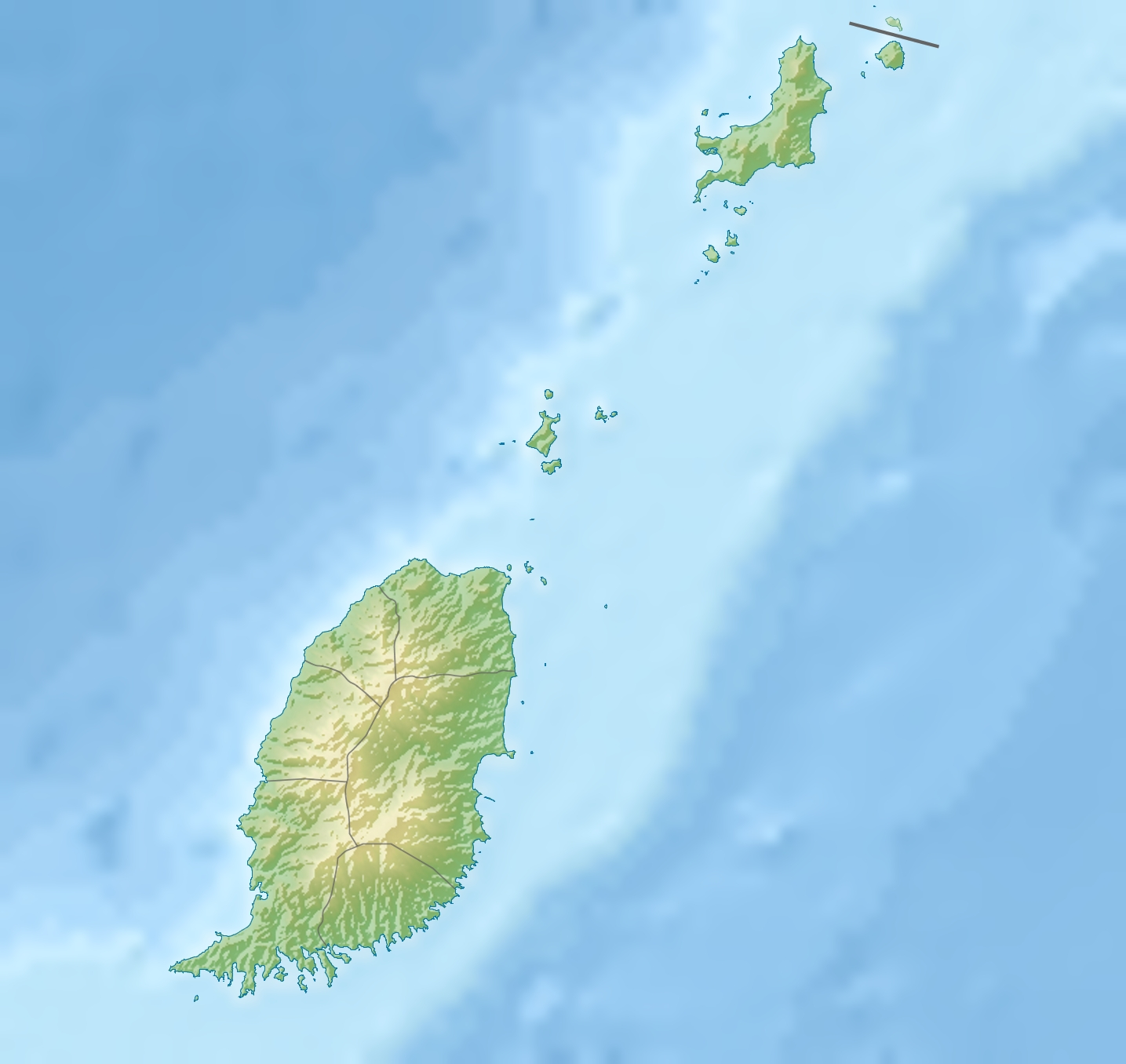
- Location of mouth

Location
- Country: Grenada

The Duquesne River is a river of Grenada.

== See also ==
- List of rivers of Grenada
