= Tempé River =

Coordinates: 12°03′N 61°44′W

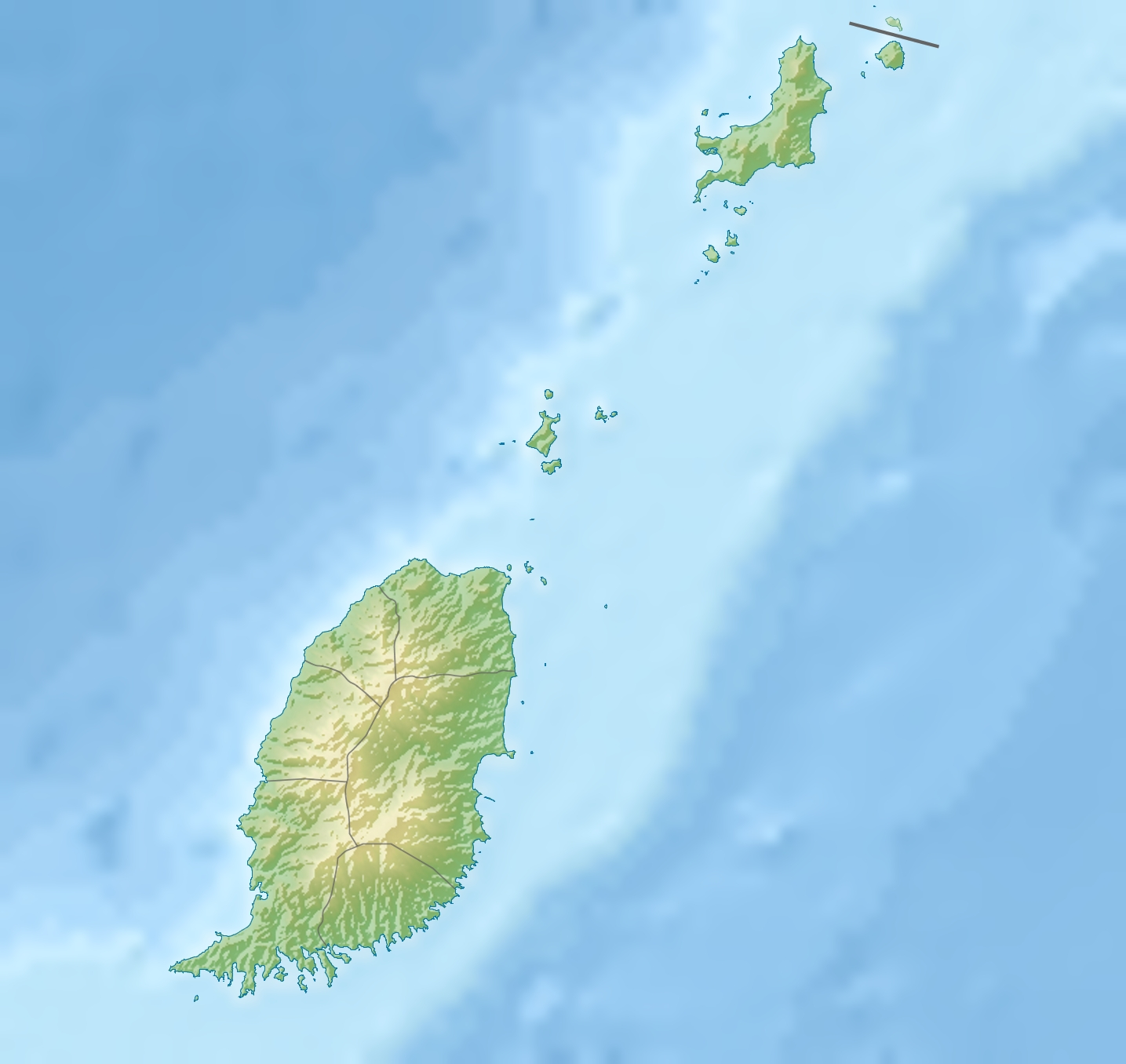
- Location of mouth

Location
- Country: Grenada

The Tempé River is a river of Grenada.

== See also ==
- List of rivers of Grenada
