= Little Palmiste River =

Coordinates: 12°09′N 61°44′W

Location
- Country: Grenada

The Little Palmiste River is a river of Grenada. In the parish of St. John, it flows from the palmiste dig. The dig structure was built over three centuries ago during the French period of colonization of Grenada.

== See also ==
- List of rivers of Grenada
