= Chemin River =

River in Grenada

Coordinates: 12°01′N 61°43′W

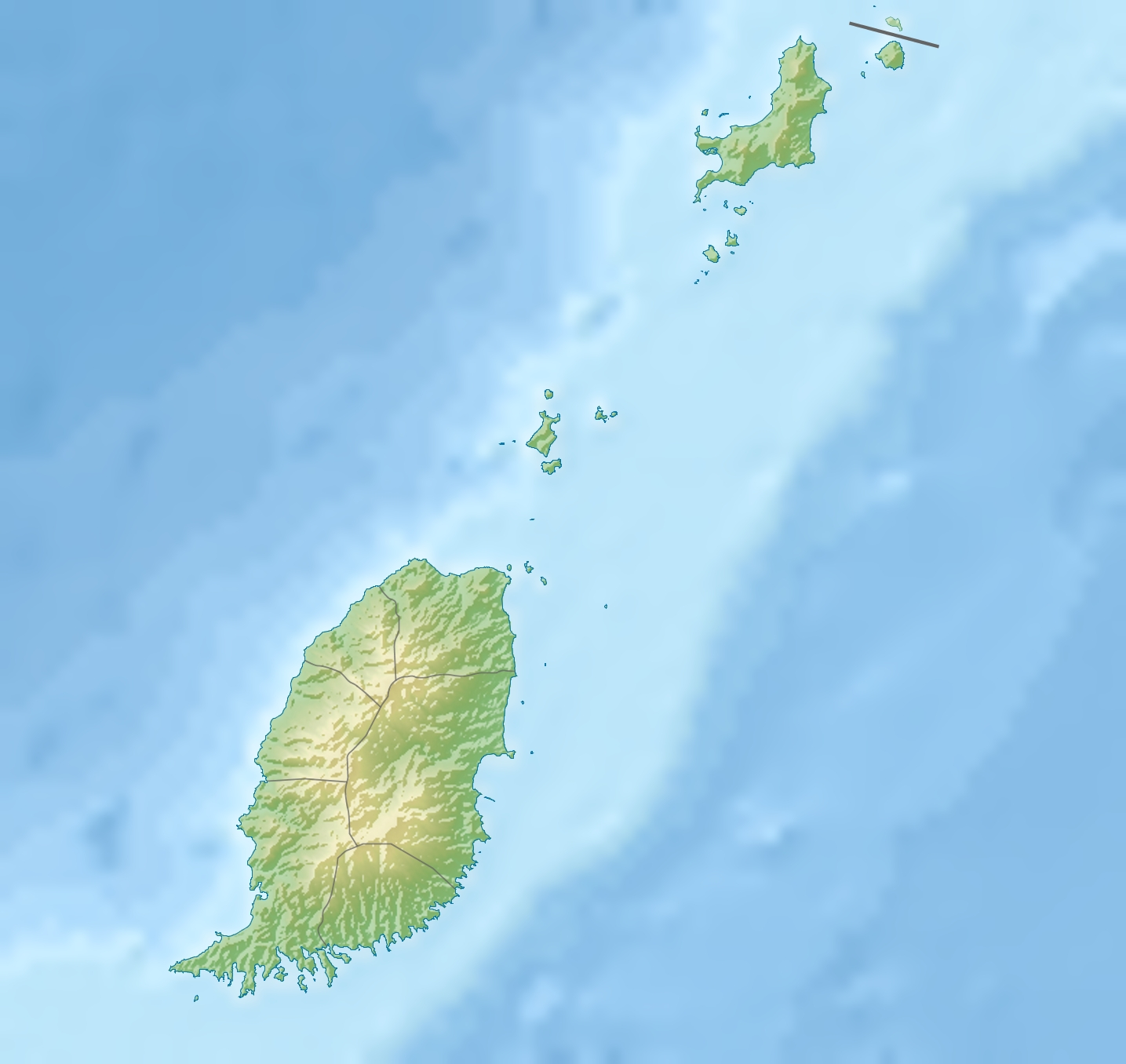
- Location of mouth

Location
- Country: Grenada

The Chemin River is a river in Grenada.

== See also ==
- List of rivers of Grenada
