= Salle River (West Coast) =

Location
- Country: Grenada

The Salle River (West Coast) is a river of Grenada.

== See also ==
- List of rivers of Grenada
