= Grand Roy River =

Coordinates: 12°08′N 61°45′W

Location
- Country: Grenada

The Grand Roy River is a river of Grenada.

== See also ==
- List of rivers of Grenada
