= River Loria =

Coordinates: 12°08′N 61°36′W

Location
- Country: Grenada

The River Loria is a river of Grenada.

== See also ==
- List of rivers of Grenada
