= Grolier (disambiguation) =

Grolier was an American publisher, now an imprint of Scholastic.

Grolier may also refer to:

- Jean Grolier de Servières, viscount d'Aguisy (1479–1565), Treasurer-General of France and a bibliophile
- Grolier Club, a private club and society of bibliophiles in New York City, United States
- Grolier Poetry Bookshop, Cambridge, Massachusetts, United States
- Old Grolier Club or 29 East 32nd Street, a building in New York City, United States
- Grolier Codex, a pre-Columbian Maya book of disputed authenticity
