= Gouyave River =

Coordinates: 12°09′N 61°44′W

Location
- Country: Grenada

The Gouyave River is a river of Grenada in the parish of St Johns.

As you approach the town of Gouyave from the south, a metal bridge straddles the river, whence the coastal road passes to the west of Windsor Park before entering the town.

The Gouyave River runs inland through the Dougaldston Estate owned by the Branch family. A small track runs inland along the south side of the river from the bridge, past the Dougaldston Cemetery, to the estate itself, once one of the foremost estates on the island, and the birthplace of Sir Geoffrey de Freitas, former British politician.

== See also ==
- List of rivers of Grenada
