= Balthazar River (Grenada) =

River in Grenada

Coordinates: 12°07′N 61°39′W

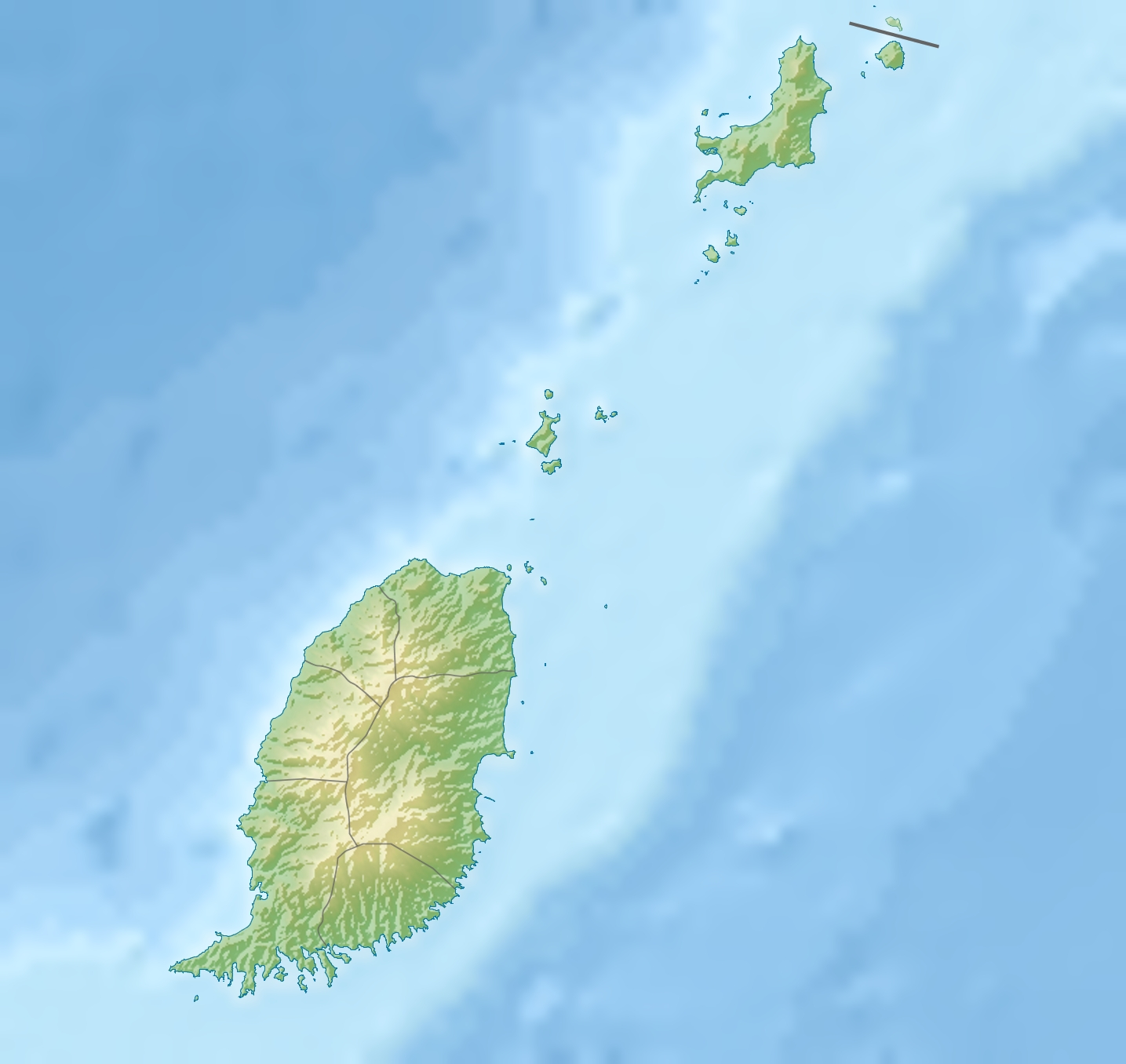
- Location of mouth

Location
- Country: Grenada

The Balthazar River is a river of Grenada.

== See also ==
- List of rivers of Grenada
