= Roi Heenok =

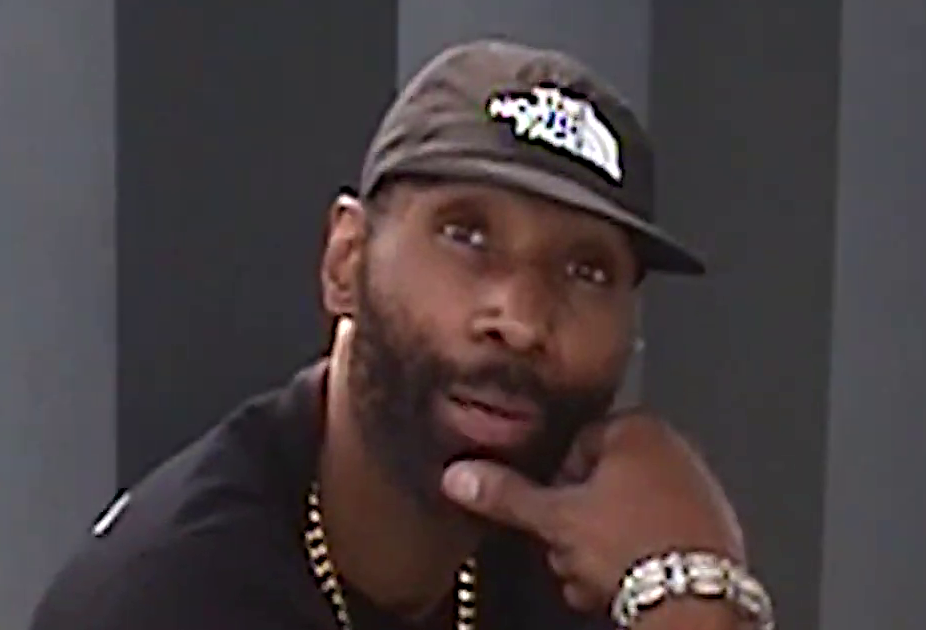

Background information
- Born: Henoc Beauséjour; November 18, 1973 (age 52)
- Origin: Montreal, Quebec, Canada
- Genre: Hip hop
- Occupations: Rapper, Producer, Entrepreneur
- Instruments: Vocals
- Years active: 2003-present
- Labels: Sony Distribution, Warner Bros. Distribution, Gangster & Gentleman Records Inc.
- Website: www.roiheenok.com

Henoc Beauséjour (French pronunciation: [enɔk boseʒuʁ]; born November 18, 1973), known by his stage name Roi Heenok (/rwɑː hiːnɒk/), is a Canadian rapper, producer and entrepreneur of Haitian descent from Montreal, Quebec.

== Early life ==
Heenok emigrated to the United States at age two. After moving several times throughout the world, his family finally settled in Montreal, Quebec. In 1989, Roi Heenok moved to Queens, New York to further craft his early love for hip hop culture and DJing. He later opened his first label Drama Stay Life Entertainment, signing and producing local artists such as Iman Thug, Bam Gotti, Rudy Red. In 1999, Heenok returned to Montreal to open his recording studio.

== Career ==
In 2003, Heenok opened his current label Gangster & Gentleman Records Inc. signing and producing local artists Rap Iso, Kinimod, UgoBoss and Lynn (first female R&B singer).

In 2005, Heenok made his first appearance on MTV France during his highly anticipated arrival in Paris. He went on to later work on movie projects including Kourtrajmé's January 2008 release of Les Mathématiques du Roi Heenok, the first DVD project ever directed by Mohamed Mazouz & Romain Gavras.

Heenok has achieved notoriety in France and the French rap market since 2004 as a result of his successful use of Internet marketing. An avant-gardist who always commands his crowd, he was the first viral video star at a time when YouTube & Dailymotion were only starting to be used as branding tools. He is known for his unique and authentic style of Queens Bridge French rap. He has worked with legendary artist Raekwon from the Wu-Tang Clan, G.O.D Pt.3 from Infamous Mobb, Green Money, Alibi Montana & Le Gued Muss. His music has appeared on the album Capitale du Crime 2 of Sony artist La Fouine.

Heenok has released three mixtapes: Propagande Américaine : La Dose in 2005, Cocaino Rap Musique Vol.1 in 2007, and Cocaino Rap Musique Vol.2 in 2009. He released his first independent album exclusively on iTunes under his label Gangster & Gentleman Inc. on 12/12/12, entitled Noirs et Professionnels.

Heenok has starred in three movie projects: Les Mathématiques du Roi Heenok directed by Mohammed Mazouz & Romain Gavras, Le Monde Selon Roi Heenok, and Le Retour à Queens Bridge directed by Amine Bouziane, Julien Lafond & Henoc Beauséjour.

Heenok founded clothing line Ghetto Elegance in 2008.

== Personal life ==
On April 17, 2008, Heeno was arrested at his Montreal recording studio stemming from the content of the 2008 DVD 'Les Mathématiques du Roi'. He was acquitted of all charges in 2013.

== Discography ==
- Propagande Américaine : La Dose, La Mixtape (2005) (Warner distribution)
- Cocaïno Rap Musique Vol.1: le CD mixé Styles Libres Exclusifs Volume 1 (2007) (Sony distribution)
- Cocaïno Rap Musique Vol.1 le DVD et CD mixé Styles Libres Exclusifs Édition Limitée (2008)
- Cocaïno Rap Musique Volume 2 : Édition Finale (2009) (Believe distribution)
- Noirs et Professionnels, (12/12/12)

== Filmography ==
- Les Mathématiques du Roi Heenok, DVD Kourtrajmé (January 2008)
- Cocaïno Rap Musique le DVD, Stuff Productions (June 2008)
- Le Monde selon Roi Heenok, DVD Stuff Productions (February 2011)
- Le Retour à Queens Bridge, web-series, G&G Films & Stuff Productions (September 2012)
