= Black Bay River (Grenada) =

River in Grenada

Coordinates: 12°07′N 61°45′W

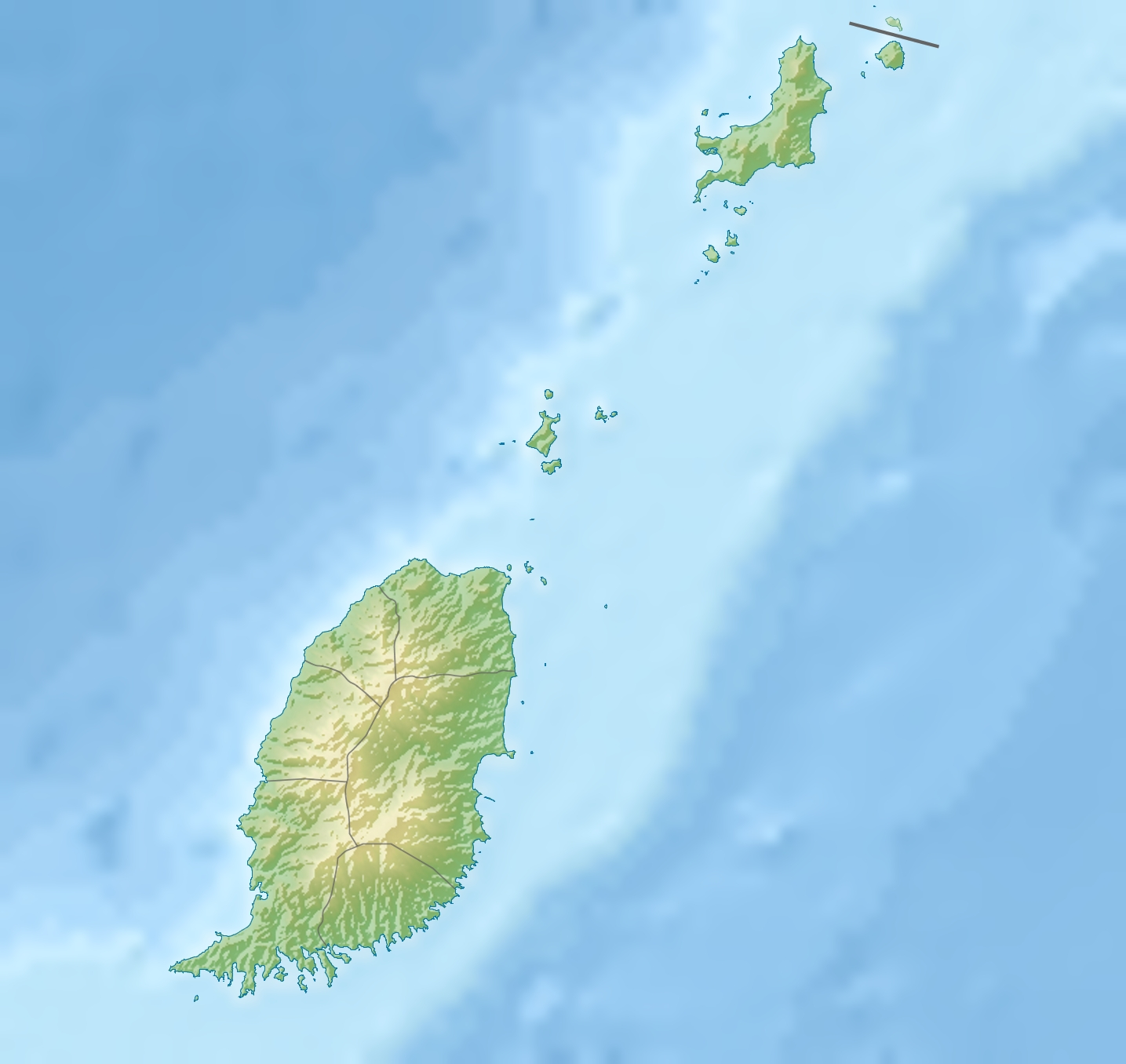
- Location of mouth

Location
- Country: Grenada

The Black Bay River is a river of Grenada.

== See also ==
- List of rivers of Grenada
