= Grand Bras River =

Coordinates: 12°08′N 61°38′W

Location
- Country: Grenada

The Grand Bras River is a river of Grenada.

== See also ==
- List of rivers of Grenada
