= Antoine River (Grenada) =

River in Grenada

Coordinates: 12°11′N 61°36′W

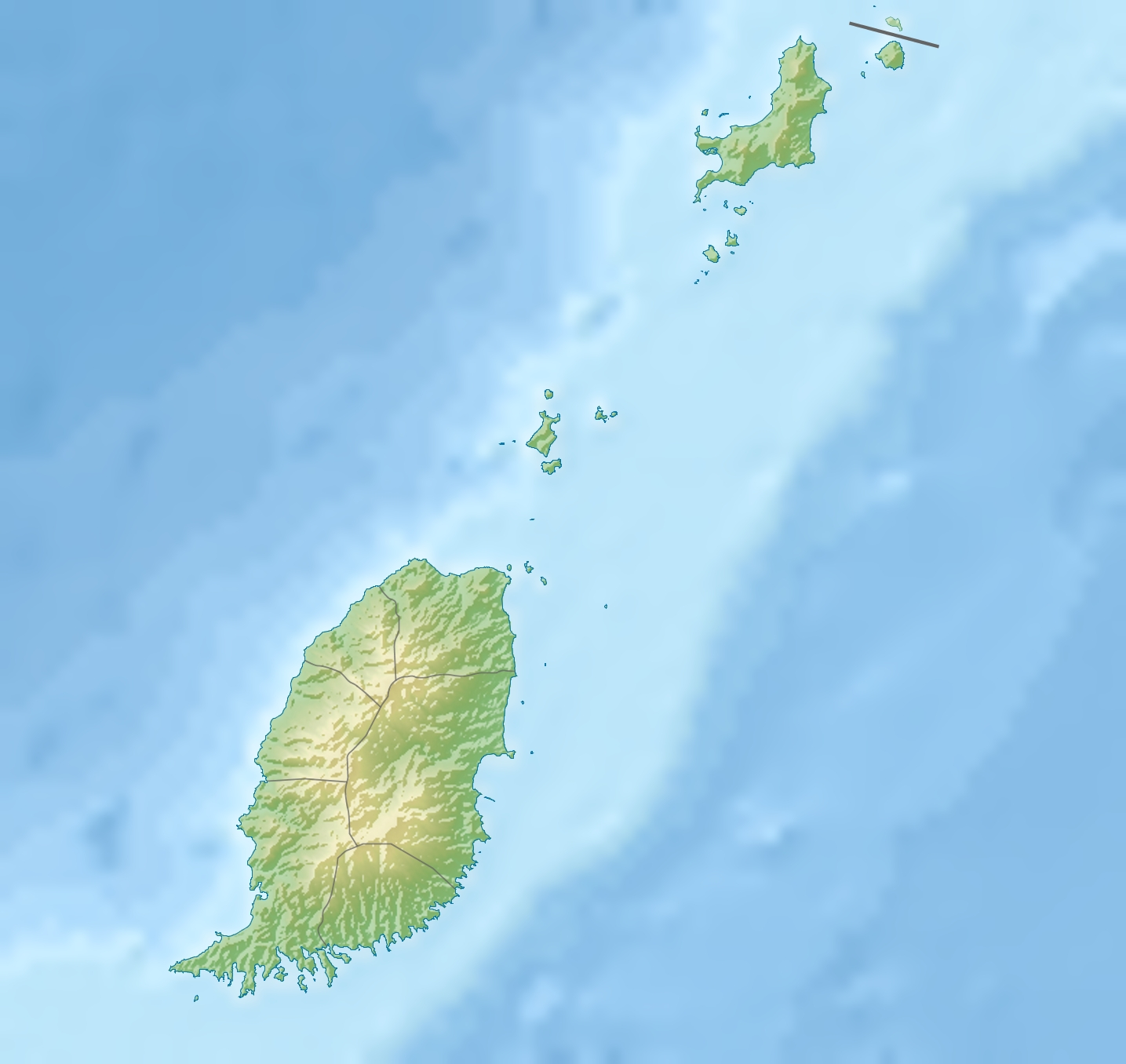
- Location of mouth

Location
- Country: Grenada

The Antoine River is a river of Grenada which is located in the Caribbean Sea .

== See also ==
- List of rivers of Grenada
