= Beauséjour River =

River in the Caribbean nation of Grenada

Coordinates: 12°05′N 61°45′W

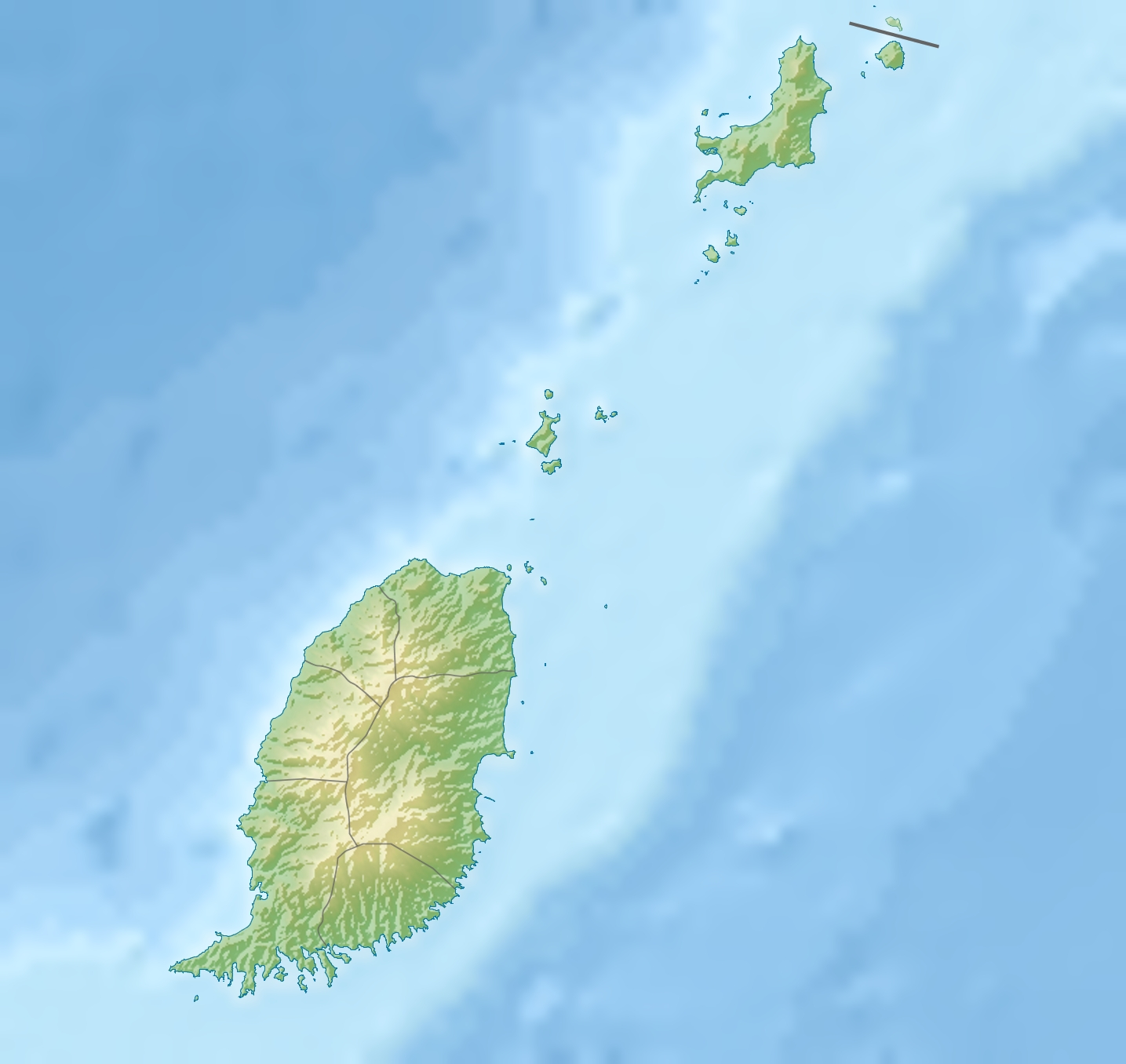
- Location of mouth

Location
- Country: Grenada

The Beauséjour River is a river in Grenada.

== See also ==
- List of rivers of Grenada
