= Little Requin River =

Coordinates: 12°02′N 61°39′W

Location
- Country: Grenada

The Little Requin River is a river of Grenada.

== See also ==
- List of rivers of Grenada
