= La Tante River =

Coordinates: 12°03′N 61°38′W

Location
- Country: Grenada

The La Tante River is a river of Grenada.

== See also ==
- List of rivers of Grenada
