= Little River of Great Bacolet =

Coordinates: 12°04′N 61°38′W

Location
- Country: Grenada

The Little River of Great Bacolet is a river in Grenada.

== See also ==
- List of rivers of Grenada
