= Charlotte River (Grenada) =

River in Grenada

Coordinates: 12°09′N 61°43′W

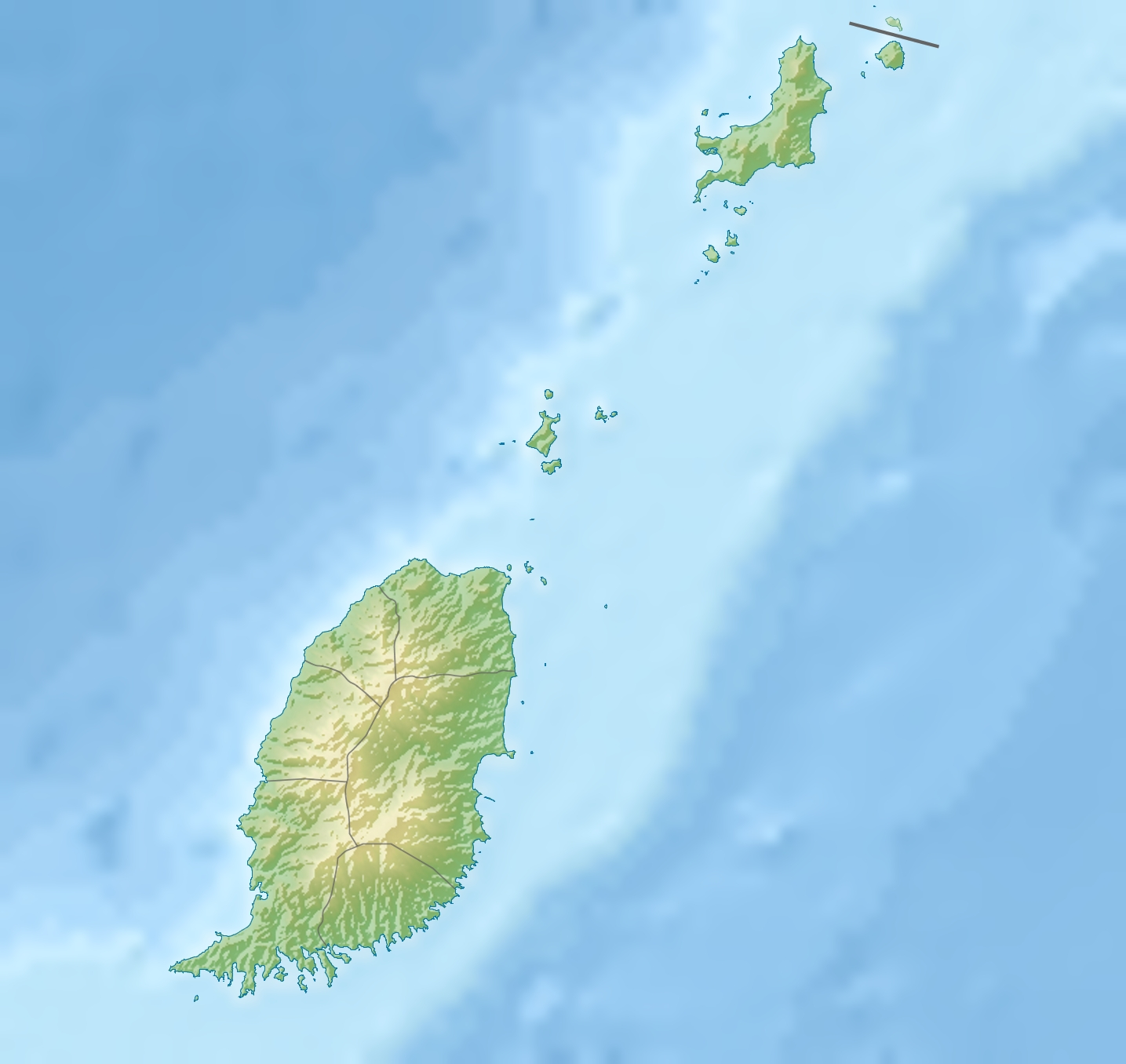

Location
- Country: Grenada

The Charlotte River is a river of Grenada. The Charlotte River is situated in the parish of St. John, in the town of Gouyave.

== See also ==
- List of rivers of Grenada
