= Saint Francis River (Grenada) =

Coordinates: 12°04′N 61°38′W

Location
- Country: Grenada

The Saint Francis River is a river of Grenada.

== See also ==
- List of rivers of Grenada
