= Madeleine Beauséjour =

Film director and editor

Madeleine Beauséjour (1946–1994) was a film editor and director from Réunion.

She was a co-founder of the activist organization Révolution Afrique. Her activist training activities and film efforts from the 1970s to the mid-1980s reflected a time marked by postcolonial racist crimes and struggles against “colonialism at home." She had links with international movements such as the Black Panthers, who financed her film project in Senegal at the end of the 1960s.

The 1988 short French-Creole film she directed Koman I le la sours portrayed the life of a young mother in the La Source district in Saint-Denis, whose house is used as a hangout by the local children.

== Films ==
- Journées portes ouvertes à Drancy, 1972 (Révo Afrique (Madeleine Beauséjour, Claude Reznik, Jean Denis Bonan, and collaborators)
- Koman I le la Sours, 1988
- Johnny et Ombline (unfinished)
