= Saint John Parish, Grenada =

Coordinates: 12°10′N 61°44′W

Saint John Parish Paroisse de Saint John
- Parish
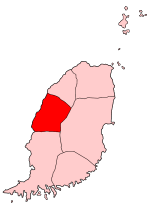
- Country: Grenada
- Capital City: Gouyave

Area
  - Total: 15 sq mi (39 km^{2})

Population
  - Total: 8,591
  - Density: 630/sq mi (244/km^{2})
- ISO 3166 code: GD-04

Saint John is one of the parishes of Grenada. Its capital is Gouyave. Fishing is the main industry. Gouyave is also home to Grenada's biggest nutmeg factory and also the Dougladston Estate, an old spice plantation. The parish has some hotels and a few small guesthouses such as the Mango Bay Cottages in Woodford.

== History ==
The parish was the scene of the battle of Belvedere estate in 1795, and was the headquarters of the Fédon rebellion. In 1889, an iron bridge was built on a new boulder bank between Gouyave and the neighbourhood of Florida. On November 8, 1897, there were heavy rains in the parish, which nearly flooded the Gouyave River. On December 6, 1897, the Gouyave-Florida boulder bank and stone bridge were destroyed. Gouyave was also known as Charlotte town.

== Constituency ==
Saint John Constituency
- Constituency
- Interactive map of Saint John Constituency
- Country: Grenada
- Parish: St John
- MP: Kerryne James
- Capital City: Gouyave

Year	Winner	Party
1984–1990	Grace Duncan	Grenada National Party
1990–1995	Edzel V. Thomas	Grenada United Labour Party
1995–1999	Grace Duncan	New National Party
1999–2008	Claris C. T. Charles	New National Party
2008–2013	Michael A. Church	National Democratic Congress
2013–2018	Alvin DaBreo	New National Party
2013–2018	Alvin DaBreo	New National Party
2022–	Kerryne James	National Democratic Congress
