= Silver River (Grenada) =

Coordinates: 12°12′N 61°42′W

Location
- Country: Grenada

The Silver River is a river of the island nation of Grenada. The river flows through Saint Mark Parish.

== See also ==
- List of rivers of Grenada
