= Lake Saint Francis =

Lake Saint Francis may refer to:

- Lake Saint Francis (Canada) (Lac Saint-François) on the Saint Lawrence River
- Lake Saint Francis in Pennsylvania
- Lake Saint Francis in Arkansas
