= Great Requin River =

Coordinates: 12°02′N 61°39′W

Location
- Country: Grenada

The Great Requin River is a river of Grenada. It is located in the parish of Saint David, in the southern part of the country, 11 km east of the capital Saint George's. The Great Requin River is located on the island of Grenada .

== See also ==
- List of rivers of Grenada
