= San Francisco River =

San Francisco River may refer to:

== North America ==
- San Francisco River (Gila River tributary) – a river of the Gila River Valley in Arizona
- Rio de Flag – formerly known as the San Francisco river, originating in the San Francisco Peaks in Arizona
- San Francisco Creek – a river and tributary of the Rio Grande in Texas

== South America ==
- San Francisco River (Argentina) – a river in Argentina
- Río San Francisco – a tributary of the Zamora River in Ecuador
- San Francisco River (Bogotá) – a river in Colombia
- Fucha River – a tributary of the Bogotá River in Colombia
- San Francisco river – a river in San Francisco Gotera, Morazán, El Salvador

=== Brazil ===
- São Francisco River – the fourth-longest river in Brazil
- São Francisco River (Belo River tributary) – a tributary of the Belo River
- São Francisco River (Jaciparaná River tributary) – a tributary of the Jaci Paraná River
- São Francisco River (São Miguel River tributary) – a tributary of the São Miguel River in Rondônia
- São Francisco River (Paraná) – a river that flows into the Paraná River
- São Francisco River (Rio de Janeiro)
- São Francisco River (Paraíba)
- São Francisco River (Jequitinhonha River tributary)

== See also ==
- San Francisco Bay – an estuary of several rivers near the city of San Francisco
