= Tante Koosje =

Fine dining restaurant in the Netherlands

Coordinates: 52°12′32.36″N 5°1′25.09″E

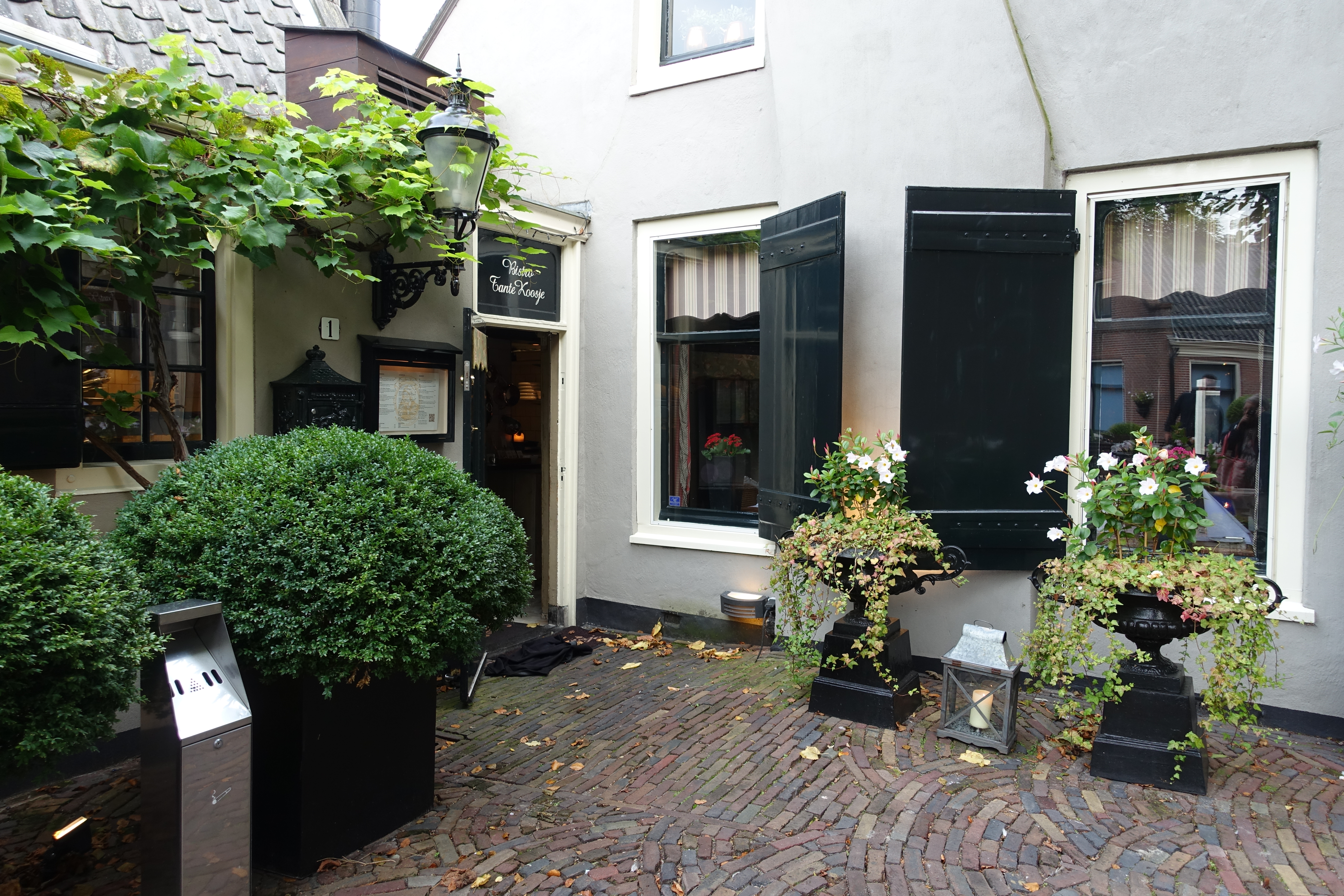
- Interactive map of Tante Koosje

Restaurant information
- Established: 1960s
- Head chef: Roland Veldhuijzen
- Food type: French
- Rating: Michelin Guide
- Location: Kerkstraat 1, Loenen aan de Vecht, 3632 EL, Netherlands
- Seating capacity: 70
- Website: www.tante-koosje.nl

Tante Koosje is a restaurant located in Loenen aan de Vecht in the Netherlands. It is a fine dining restaurant that was awarded one Michelin star in the period 1998-2003 and 2006–2026.

Gault Millau awarded the restaurant 15 out of 20 points.

Head chef of Tante Koosje is Roland Veldhuijzen. In 2007, he managed to retain the star awarded to Sidney Heinze in 2006.

The building is a Rijksmonument.

== Head chefs ==
- 2006–present: Roland Veldhuijzen
- 2006: Sidney Heinze
- 2003: Joost de Vos
- 2002: Erik de Boer

== The name ==
According to the website of the restaurant, the name "Tante Koosje" is derived from mrs. Koosje Edema, former occupant of the building. She led a reclusive life, but was still well known in Loenen aan de Vecht. After her death in 1958, the municipality wanted to demolish her house and several others. After protests, the houses were renovated. Later, when the local council was discussing the future of the building, they referred to it as "Het huis van Tante Koosje" (The House of Auntie Koosje). This was adopted as the name of the restaurant.

== See also ==
- List of Michelin starred restaurants in the Netherlands
