= Bacolet, Grenada =

Bacolet
- Village
- Location within Grenada
- Coordinates: 12°2′N 61°41′W
- Country: Grenada
- Parish: Saint David
- Elevation: 125 ft (38 m)
- Time zone: UTC-4

Bacolet, Grenada is a town in the south-east of Grenada, Caribbean. It is also referred to as Baillies Bacolet. It is located in the Parish of Saint David.
