= 2022 CONCACAF Women's U-17 Championship squads =

Women's U-17 Football Championship

This article describes about the squads for the 2022 CONCACAF Women's U-17 Championship.

== Group E ==
=== Nicaragua ===
The squad was announced on 20 April 2022.

Head coach: Jennifer Fernández

| No. | Pos. | Player | Date of birth (age) | Club |
|---|---|---|---|---|
| 1 | GK | Yahoska García | 29 December 2005 (aged 16) | (Nicaraguan Football Federation) Real Somotillo FC |
| 12 | GK | Francela Maltez | 23 July 2005 (aged 16) | (Nicaraguan Football Federation) Walter Ferretti |
| 2 | DF | Stella Villalta | 27 October 2005 (aged 16) | (The Football Association) Arsenal FC |
| 3 | DF | Cinthya Calero | 13 December 2005 (aged 16) | (Nicaraguan Football Federation) Leonas de Managua |
| 4 | DF | Ariana Munguía | 12 May 2006 (aged 15) | (Nicaraguan Football Federation) Zacarías Guerra |
| 5 | DF | Aura Zeledón | 9 March 2006 (aged 16) | (Nicaraguan Football Federation) Real Estelí |
| 6 | DF | Vanessa Altamirano | 3 July 2006 (aged 15) | (Nicaraguan Football Federation) Managua FC |
| 18 | DF | Jennyfer Toval | 11 September 2006 (aged 15) | (Nicaraguan Football Federation) Leonas de Managua |
| 19 | DF | Ana Martínez | 26 October 2006 (aged 15) | (Nicaraguan Football Federation) Leonas de Managua |
| 9 | MF | Adriana Munguía | 12 May 2006 (aged 15) | (Nicaraguan Football Federation) Zacarías Guerra |
| 10 | MF | Jenifer Sarantes | 13 December 2005 (aged 16) | (Nicaraguan Football Federation) Real Estelí |
| 13 | MF | Daniela Manzanares | 2 June 2006 (aged 15) | (Nicaraguan Football Federation) Real Estelí |
| 14 | MF | Anyi Loza | 5 May 2005 (aged 16) | (Nicaraguan Football Federation) Real Estelí |
| 15 | MF | Flavia Jiménez | 27 May 2005 (aged 16) | (United States Soccer Federation) FC Prime |
| 17 | MF | Verónica Navarrete | 26 February 2007 (aged 15) | (Nicaraguan Football Federation) Las Leyendas FC |
| 20 | MF | Betzabeth Cárcamo | 8 March 2006 (aged 16) | (Nicaraguan Football Federation) Real Estelí |
| 7 | FW | Sara Arévalo | 3 September 2005 (aged 16) | (Nicaraguan Football Federation) Diriangén FC |
| 8 | FW | Perla Garache | 1 October 2007 (aged 14) | (Nicaraguan Football Federation) Real Estelí |
| 11 | FW | Hilary Munguía | 19 October 2006 (aged 15) | (Nicaraguan Football Federation) Leonas de Managua |
| 16 | FW | Lesli Márquez | 21 June 2006 (aged 15) | (Nicaraguan Football Federation) Diriangén FC |

=== Panama ===
The squad was announced on 19 April 2022.

Head coach: Raiza Gutiérrez

| No. | Pos. | Player | Date of birth (age) | Club |
|---|---|---|---|---|
| 1 | GK | Yurisel Ortega | 15 January 2005 (aged 17) | (Panamanian Football Federation) SD Panamá Oeste |
| 12 | GK | Maritza Valdés | 2 June 2005 (aged 16) | (Panamanian Football Federation) SD Atlético Nacional |
| 2 | DF | Génesis Pinto | 25 October 2005 (aged 16) | (Panamanian Football Federation) Mario Méndez FC |
| 3 | DF | Amayah Singleton | 3 June 2005 (aged 16) | (United States Soccer Federation) Wake FC |
| 4 | DF | Dayane Madrid | 30 October 2006 (aged 15) | (Panamanian Football Federation) Tauro FC |
| 11 | DF | Angelys Ceballos | 2 February 2005 (aged 17) | (Panamanian Football Federation) SD Atlético Nacional |
| 15 | DF | Sara Nieto | 19 September 2005 (aged 16) | (Panamanian Football Federation) Sporting SM |
| 16 | DF | Daniela Pretelt-Kieswetter | 12 April 2005 (aged 17) | (Panamanian Football Federation) CIEX Sports Academy |
| 17 | DF | Karolina Rivera | 9 August 2005 (aged 16) | (Panamanian Football Federation) CD Plaza Amador |
| 5 | MF | Yomara Case | 20 April 2005 (aged 17) | (Panamanian Football Federation) CA Independiente |
| 6 | MF | Diana Cantoral | 5 February 2006 (aged 16) | (Panamanian Football Federation) Alianza FC |
| 7 | MF | Sherline King | 3 March 2003 (aged 19) | (Panamanian Football Federation) CD Plaza Amador |
| 8 | MF | Delineth Rivera | 8 May 6 (aged 2015) | (Panamanian Football Federation) Sporting SM |
| 10 | MF | Reggina Espino | 20 June 2006 (aged 15) | (Panamanian Football Federation) Sporting SM |
| 18 | MF | Ninelys Castrellón | 22 September 2006 (aged 15) | (Panamanian Football Federation) Atlético Chiriquí |
| 19 | MF | Marissa Gross | 8 July 2005 (aged 16) | (United States Soccer Federation) Dallas Texans |
| 20 | MF | Kayra Pérez | 19 February 2007 (aged 15) | (Panamanian Football Federation) Sporting SM |
| 9 | FW | Daniela Hincapié | 4 March 2005 (aged 17) | (Panamanian Football Federation) CA Independiente |
| 13 | FW | Betseba Conte | 17 August 2006 (aged 15) | (Panamanian Football Federation) SD Panamá Oeste |
| 14 | FW | Milagro Roberts | 24 February 2005 (aged 17) | (Panamanian Football Federation) Tauro FC |

=== Mexico ===
The squad was announced on 15 April 2022.

Head coach: Ana Galindo

| No. | Pos. | Player | Date of birth (age) | Club |
|---|---|---|---|---|
| 1 | GK | Carmen López | 17 March 2005 (aged 17) | (United States Soccer Federation) DKSC |
| 12 | GK | Renatta Cota | December 2005 (aged 16) | (Mexican Football Federation) América |
| 2 | DF | Michel Fong | 2 June 2006 (aged 15) | (Mexican Football Federation) Tijuana |
| 3 | DF | Daniela Meza | 28 February 2005 (aged 17) | (Mexican Football Federation) Atlas |
| 4 | DF | Natalia Colin | 17 May 2005 (aged 16) | (Mexican Football Federation) Toluca |
| 5 | DF | Giselle Espinoza | 8 March 2005 (aged 17) | (United States Soccer Federation) Concorde Fire |
| 13 | DF | Brenda Vega | 22 July 2005 (aged 16) | (Mexican Football Federation) Toluca |
| 20 | DF | Fernanda Quiroz | 2 September 2006 (aged 15) | (Mexican Football Federation) Tijuana |
| 6 | MF | Sofía Jiménez | 9 March 2005 (aged 17) | (Mexican Football Federation) Puebla |
| 8 | MF | Grecia Pineda | 2 January 2005 (aged 17) | (Mexican Football Federation) UNAM |
| 10 | MF | Alice Soto | 26 March 2006 (aged 16) | (Mexican Football Federation) Pachuca |
| 16 | MF | Valeria Ramón | 4 February 2005 (aged 17) | (Mexican Football Federation) Tijuana |
| 17 | MF | Katherin Guijarro | 4 April 2005 (aged 17) | (Mexican Football Federation) Tijuana |
| 18 | MF | Jade Martínez | 27 August 2005 (aged 16) | (United States Soccer Federation) DKSC |
| 19 | MF | Montserrat Saldívar | 20 September 2006 (aged 15) | (Mexican Football Federation) América |
| 7 | FW | Maribel Flores | 8 January 2005 (aged 17) | (United States Soccer Federation) Slammers FC HB Køge |
| 9 | FW | Tatiana Flores | 15 September 2005 (aged 16) | (The Football Association) Chelsea |
| 11 | FW | Valerie Vargas | 25 May 2005 (aged 16) | (United States Soccer Federation) Beach FC |
| 14 | FW | Deiry Ramírez | 30 June 2006 (aged 15) | (Mexican Football Federation) UANL |
| 15 | FW | Layla Sirdah | 14 September 2005 (aged 16) | (United States Soccer Federation) Tophat SC |

=== Trinidad and Tobago ===
The squad was announced on 20 April 2022.

Head coach: Jason Spence

| No. | Pos. | Player | Date of birth (age) | Club |
|---|---|---|---|---|
| 1 | GK | Sadiel Antoine | 24 August 2006 (aged 15) | (Trinidad and Tobago Football Association) Central FC |
| 16 | GK | Alexandra Ennals | 5 November 2006 (aged 15) | (Trinidad and Tobago Football Association) St. Joseph's Convent |
| 18 | GK | Shaunda Sheppard | 5 April 2005 (aged 17) | (Trinidad and Tobago Football Association) Jewels FC |
| 2 | DF | Faith Alexander | 21 October 2005 (aged 16) | (Trinidad and Tobago Football Association) All Stars FC |
| 3 | DF | Makeba Morang | 7 January 2005 (aged 17) | (Trinidad and Tobago Football Association) St. Augustine FC |
| 5 | DF | Cicely-Ann Wickham | 30 July 2005 (aged 16) | Unattached |
| 6 | DF | Shadea Andrews | 26 October 2006 (aged 15) | (Trinidad and Tobago Football Association) Black Panthers WSC |
| 13 | DF | Tayeann Wylie | 7 December 2006 (aged 15) | (Trinidad and Tobago Football Association) Premier FC |
| 14 | DF | Trischell Charles | 5 November 2005 (aged 16) | (Trinidad and Tobago Football Association) West Side Academy |
| 19 | DF | Emily Nanton | 11 May 2006 (aged 15) | (Trinidad and Tobago Football Association) Pro Series Events |
| 4 | MF | Angel Berot | 6 June 2005 (aged 16) | (Trinidad and Tobago Football Association) Maracas FC |
| 7 | MF | Nikita Jackson | 30 July 2006 (aged 15) | (United States Soccer Federation) Dallas Sting |
| 8 | MF | Marley Walker | 19 October 2005 (aged 16) | (United States Soccer Federation) Charleston Soccer Club |
| 10 | MF | Jeniecia Benjamin | 24 August 2005 (aged 16) | (Trinidad and Tobago Football Association) West Side Academy |
| 12 | MF | Arie Bhagan | 12 April 2005 (aged 17) | (Trinidad and Tobago Football Association) St. Joseph's Convent |
| 15 | MF | Aliyah Hudlin | 14 January 2005 (aged 17) | (Trinidad and Tobago Football Association) Cox Coaching School |
| 17 | MF | Hannah Viera | 29 December 2006 (aged 15) | (Trinidad and Tobago Football Association) Pro Series Events |
| 9 | FW | Breanna Smith | 3 October 2005 (aged 16) | (Trinidad and Tobago Football Association) Laventille United |
| 11 | FW | Jhelysse Anthony | 2 June 2005 (aged 16) | (United States Soccer Federation) International Soccer Club |
| 20 | FW | Jada Graham | 7 December 2006 (aged 15) | (Trinidad and Tobago Football Association) Black Panthers WSC |

== Group F ==
=== Dominican Republic ===
The squad was announced on 18 April 2022.

Head coach: Betzaida Ubri

| No. | Pos. | Player | Date of birth (age) | Club |
|---|---|---|---|---|
| 1 | GK | Paloma Peña | 20 February 2005 (aged 17) | (United States Soccer Federation) FC Prime |
| 12 | GK | Rosmaira De Paula | 27 August 2005 (aged 16) | (Dominican Football Federation) Richard FC |
| 2 | DF | Janna Vásquez | 16 May 2006 (aged 15) | (Dominican Football Federation) DV7 Academy |
| 4 | DF | Adriana Adames | 28 September 2005 (aged 16) | (Dominican Football Federation) Santa Fe FC |
| 6 | DF | Isabella Ventura | 14 November 2006 (aged 15) | (United States Soccer Federation) Sunrise Sting Soccer |
| 15 | DF | Kalilah Akbar | 27 January 2005 (aged 17) | (United States Soccer Federation) Connecticut FC |
| 16 | DF | Faith Marie Espiritusanto | 29 January 2006 (aged 16) | (United States Soccer Federation) FC Prime |
| 17 | DF | Loeymy Soto | 15 February 2005 (aged 17) | (Dominican Football Federation) CDR 5 de Abril |
| 18 | DF | Nelianny Amador | 2 July 2005 (aged 16) | (Dominican Football Federation) CDR 5 de Abril |
| 3 | MF | Renata Mercedes | 22 October 2007 (aged 14) | (United States Soccer Federation) Taft School |
| 5 | MF | Jeanery Díaz | 25 August 2007 (aged 14) | (Dominican Football Federation) Cibao FC |
| 7 | MF | Yomeiry Abreu | 24 April 2005 (aged 16) | (Dominican Football Federation) A4 Sports Club |
| 8 | MF | Jazmin Herrera | 14 July 2005 (aged 16) | (United States Soccer Federation) FC Prime |
| 13 | MF | María Torreira | 3 February 2006 (aged 16) | (Dominican Football Federation) Santa Fe FC |
| 14 | MF | Ansley Castro | 19 November 2007 (aged 14) | (United States Soccer Federation) FC Copa New Jersey |
| 20 | MF | Melany Alcántara | 25 August 2005 (aged 16) | (Dominican Football Federation) Bob Soccer School |
| 9 | FW | Arianna Díaz | 6 April 2005 (aged 17) | (United States Soccer Federation) East Meadow SC |
| 10 | FW | Alexa Castro | 3 January 2007 (aged 15) | (United States Soccer Federation) FC Copa New Jersey |
| 11 | FW | Evelyn Chudowsky | 13 September 2006 (aged 15) | (United States Soccer Federation) NY Soccer Club |
| 19 | FW | Julia Jiménez | 28 December 2007 (aged 14) | (Dominican Football Federation) Club San Gabriel |

=== Bermuda ===
Head coach: Aaron Denkins

| No. | Pos. | Player | Date of birth (age) | Club |
|---|---|---|---|---|
| 1 | GK | Samantha Davies | 18 May 2005 (aged 16) | (Canadian Soccer Association) Albert College |
| 6 | GK | Daniell Simons | 4 September 2005 (aged 16) | (Bermuda Football Association) Dandy Town |
| 12 | GK | Dominique Brown | 11 October 2007 (aged 14) | Unattached |
| 2 | DF | Sanaa Simmons | 28 March 2006 (aged 16) | (Bermuda Football Association) BFLA |
| 4 | DF | Samara Darrell | 24 June 2006 (aged 15) | (Bermuda Football Association) BFLA |
| 8 | DF | Selah Dillard | 18 November 2005 (aged 16) | Unattached |
| 13 | DF | Zorena Anderson | 15 February 2005 (aged 17) | (Bermuda Football Association) Bermuda High School |
| 18 | DF | Keidel Astwood | 13 October 2005 (aged 16) | (Bermuda Football Association) Dandy Town |
| 20 | DF | Christia Lugo-Elibox | 9 April 2007 (aged 15) | (Bermuda Football Association) Dandy Town |
| 5 | MF | K'xiyae Gibbons | 28 April 2005 (aged 16) | (Bermuda Football Association) Dandy Town |
| 7 | MF | Jahni Simmons | 24 August 2005 (aged 16) | (Bermuda Football Association) BFLA |
| 10 | MF | Katelyn Medeiros | 4 February 2005 (aged 17) | (United States Soccer Federation) IMG Academy |
| 11 | MF | Sarai Richardson | 2 November 2005 (aged 16) | (Bermuda Football Association) BFLA |
| 15 | MF | Ramiah Brangman | 26 May 2006 (aged 15) | (United States Soccer Federation) Montverde Academy |
| 17 | MF | Camryn Lines | 13 January 2007 (aged 15) | (Bermuda Football Association) Pembroke Hamilton Club |
| 19 | MF | Azari Easton | 22 January 2005 (aged 17) | (Bermuda Football Association) Dandy Town |
| 3 | FW | Robin-Valana Pearman | 18 September 2007 (aged 14) | (Bermuda Football Association) BFLA |
| 9 | FW | Ashley DaSilva | 9 July 2005 (aged 16) | (Bermuda Football Association) Bermuda High School |
| 14 | FW | Brittany Pacheco | 4 March 2006 (aged 16) | (Bermuda Football Association) BFLA |
| 16 | FW | Jahde Simmons | 24 August 2005 (aged 16) | (Bermuda Football Association) BFLA |

=== Canada ===
The squad was announced on 19 April 2022.

Head coach: Emma Humphries

| No. | Pos. | Player | Date of birth (age) | Club |
|---|---|---|---|---|
| 1 | GK | Coralie Lallier | 26 May 2005 (aged 16) | (Canadian Soccer Association) NDC-CDN Québec |
| 18 | GK | Noelle Henning | 4 February 2007 (aged 15) | (Canadian Soccer Association) NDC-CDN Ontario |
| 2 | DF | Mya Archibald | 31 March 2005 (aged 17) | (Canadian Soccer Association) Nova Scotia REX |
| 3 | DF | Ella Ottey | 12 August 2005 (aged 16) | (Canadian Soccer Association) NDC-CDN Ontario |
| 5 | DF | Zoe Markesini | 7 October 2005 (aged 16) | (Canadian Soccer Association) NDC-CDN Ontario |
| 6 | DF | Clare Logan | 24 August 2005 (aged 16) | (Canadian Soccer Association) Vancouver Whitecaps FC |
| 12 | DF | Janet Okeke | 1 March 2006 (aged 16) | (Canadian Soccer Association) NDC-CDN Québec |
| 17 | DF | Ireoluwa Omotayo | 15 February 2005 (aged 17) | (Canadian Soccer Association) Calgary Rangers SC |
| 4 | MF | Isabel Monck | 30 January 2005 (aged 17) | (Canadian Soccer Association) Whitecaps FC Alberta Academy |
| 8 | MF | Felicia Roy | 7 April 2006 (aged 16) | (Canadian Soccer Association) NDC-CDN Québec |
| 10 | MF | Jeneva Hernandez Gray | 5 October 2006 (aged 15) | (Canadian Soccer Association) Vancouver Whitecaps FC |
| 13 | MF | Anna Hauer | 2 October 2005 (aged 16) | (Canadian Soccer Association) Whitecaps FC Alberta Academy |
| 16 | MF | Ashley Roberts | 11 March 2006 (aged 16) | (Canadian Soccer Association) Vancouver Whitecaps FC |
| 7 | FW | Amanda Allen | 21 February 2005 (aged 17) | (Canadian Soccer Association) NDC-CDN Ontario |
| 9 | FW | Nyah Rose | 4 April 2005 (aged 17) | (Canadian Soccer Association) NDC-CDN Ontario |
| 11 | FW | Rosa Maalouf | 19 June 2006 (aged 15) | (Canadian Soccer Association) NDC-CDN Ontario |
| 14 | FW | Jade Bordeleau | 8 February 2005 (aged 17) | (Canadian Soccer Association) NDC-CDN Québec |
| 15 | FW | Cami Colpitts | 6 December 2005 (aged 16) | (United States Soccer Federation) San Francisco Elite Academy |
| 19 | FW | Renee Watson | 28 May 2005 (aged 16) | (Canadian Soccer Association) NDC-CDN Ontario |
| 20 | FW | Jaime Perrault | 8 August 2006 (aged 15) | (Canadian Soccer Association) Vancouver Whitecaps FC |

=== Jamaica ===
The squad was announced on 15 April 2022.

Head coach: Dane Chambers

| No. | Pos. | Player | Date of birth (age) | Club |
|---|---|---|---|---|
| 1 | GK | Liya Brooks | 17 May 2005 (aged 16) | Unattached |
| 13 | GK | Dreanna Thaw | 4 November 2005 (aged 16) | (Jamaica Football Federation) Reinas Academy |
| 2 | DF | Lillian Clarke | 15 November 2005 (aged 16) | (Jamaica Football Federation) Reinas Academy |
| 3 | DF | Akeliah Johnson | 13 January 2006 (aged 16) | (Jamaica Football Federation) Waterhouse FC |
| 5 | DF | Tyesha Nelson | 16 September 2006 (aged 15) | (Jamaica Football Federation) Reinas Academy |
| 6 | DF | Kerrisan Lawrence | 13 September 2005 (aged 16) | Unattached |
| 8 | DF | Dannique Wilson | 12 April 2005 (aged 17) | (Jamaica Football Federation) Real Mobay FC |
| 17 | DF | Andrene Smith | 26 November 2006 (aged 15) | (Jamaica Football Federation) UWI FC |
| 4 | MF | Janeil Mignott | 13 May 2005 (aged 16) | (Jamaica Football Federation) Waterhouse FC |
| 7 | MF | Shaneil Buckley | 20 May 2005 (aged 16) | (Jamaica Football Federation) Waterhouse FC |
| 10 | MF | Tiny Seaton | 12 August 2006 (aged 15) | (Jamaica Football Federation) Waterhouse FC |
| 14 | MF | Avery Johnson | 12 November 2006 (aged 15) | (United States Soccer Federation) Charlotte Development Academy |
| 15 | MF | Gabrielle Bryan | 29 October 2005 (aged 16) | (Jamaica Football Federation) Real Mobay FC |
| 18 | MF | Maya Raghunandan | 4 September 2007 (aged 14) | (United States Soccer Federation) Philadelphia Ukrainians |
| 19 | MF | Fredricka Finnikin | 15 March 2006 (aged 16) | (Jamaica Football Federation) Real Mobay FC |
| 9 | FW | Natoya Atkinson | 16 March 2005 (aged 17) | (Jamaica Football Federation) Denham Town High |
| 11 | FW | Destiny Powell | 10 April 2007 (aged 15) | (Jamaica Football Federation) Waterhouse FC |
| 12 | FW | Kiona Tulloach | 13 June 2005 (aged 16) | (Jamaica Football Federation) Waterhouse FC |
| 16 | FW | Sundai Amele | 25 December 2006 (aged 15) | (The Football Association) Tottenham Hotspurs |
| 20 | FW | Kieba Cowan | 30 October 2005 (aged 16) | Unattached |

== Group G ==
=== Grenada ===
Head coach: Randy Boca

| No. | Pos. | Player | Date of birth (age) | Club |
|---|---|---|---|---|
| 1 | GK | Tiara McIntosh | 25 July 2007 (aged 14) | (Grenada Football Association) Boca Juniors FC |
| 12 | GK | Kristina Bartholomew | 13 March 2007 (aged 15) | (Grenada Football Association) St. Andrews Vanguard |
| 2 | DF | Angelie Cyrus | 31 January 2006 (aged 16) | (Grenada Football Association) Boca Juniors FC |
| 3 | DF | Teasia Jones | 9 September 2005 (aged 16) | (Grenada Football Association) Paradise FC International |
| 5 | DF | Tiyana Lewis | 20 July 2006 (aged 15) | Unattached |
| 6 | DF | Jadine Baptiste | 19 June 2006 (aged 15) | (Grenada Football Association) St. Andrews Vanguard |
| 15 | DF | Kimberly McQueen | 28 March 2005 (aged 17) | (Grenada Football Association) Boca Juniors FC |
| 18 | DF | Nickada Courtney | 20 November 2006 (aged 15) | (Grenada Football Association) Paradise FC International |
| 20 | DF | Shannel Britton | 24 November 2005 (aged 16) | Unattached |
| 4 | MF | Sharleen Francois | 22 March 2006 (aged 16) | (Grenada Football Association) St. Andrews Vanguard |
| 7 | MF | Sara Dowden | 12 March 2007 (aged 15) | (Grenada Football Association) Just Sports FC |
| 10 | MF | Melania Fullerton | 11 April 2005 (aged 17) | (United States Soccer Federation) FC Dallas |
| 11 | MF | Leticia Williams | 26 February 2006 (aged 16) | (Grenada Football Association) St. Andrews Vanguard |
| 14 | MF | Monique Noel | 29 October 2005 (aged 16) | (Grenada Football Association) St. Andrews Vanguard |
| 17 | MF | Joshenie Fortune | 9 August 2006 (aged 15) | (Grenada Football Association) St. Andrews Vanguard |
| 19 | MF | Nyhela Hillaira | 22 September 2006 (aged 15) | (Grenada Football Association) St. Andrews Vanguard |
| 8 | FW | Abigail Williams | 19 June 2007 (aged 14) | (Grenada Football Association) St. Andrews Vanguard |
| 9 | FW | Amelia Bubb | 7 October 2006 (aged 15) | (Grenada Football Association) Just Sports FC |
| 13 | FW | Cassima Langaigne | 26 July 2006 (aged 15) | (Grenada Football Association) Hurricanes SC |
| 16 | FW | Javelle Alexander | 19 August 2005 (aged 16) | (Grenada Football Association) Queens Park Rangers |

=== Puerto Rico ===
The squad was announced on 21 April 2022.

Head coach: Sergio Castro

| No. | Pos. | Player | Date of birth (age) | Club |
|---|---|---|---|---|
| 1 | GK | Ariana Anderson | 13 January 2005 (aged 17) | (United States Soccer Federation) Solar 05 ECNL Bates |
| 12 | GK | Alondra Iriarte | 11 April 2006 (aged 16) | (Puerto Rican Football Federation) Bayamón FC |
| 7 | DF | Maya Berndt | 28 April 2005 (aged 16) | (United States Soccer Federation) Florida United |
| 8 | DF | Aleah Rivera | 19 December 2005 (aged 16) | (United States Soccer Federation) Atlanta Fire United |
| 9 | DF | Sofía Colón-González | 17 February 2005 (aged 17) | (United States Soccer Federation) Virginia Development Academy |
| 11 | DF | Elismarih González | 23 July 2005 (aged 16) | (United States Soccer Federation) Black Rock FC |
| 13 | DF | Kiara Aguayo Castillo | | (Puerto Rican Football Federation) Taurinos de Cayey |
| 16 | DF | Alejandra López | 29 September 2005 (aged 16) | (Puerto Rican Football Federation) Caribbean Stars |
| 17 | DF | Jazira González | 21 September 2005 (aged 16) | (United States Soccer Federation) Cleveland Force SC |
| 2 | MF | Payton Quiñones | 22 February 2006 (aged 16) | (United States Soccer Federation) Lower Merion Impact 06’ |
| 4 | MF | Eva Anderson | 31 December 2005 (aged 16) | (United States Soccer Federation) Slammers FC |
| 5 | MF | Bianca Arraiza | 9 June 2005 (aged 16) | (Puerto Rican Football Federation) PR SurfPR Surf |
| 6 | MF | Rachel Báez | 23 January 2005 (aged 17) | (Puerto Rican Football Federation) Ironbound Soccer Club |
| 14 | MF | Andrea Haddock | 19 July 2006 (aged 15) | (Puerto Rican Football Federation) Escuela de Fútbol Taurinos de Cayey |
| 19 | MF | Fabiola Martínez del Valle | 10 May 2005 (aged 16) | (Puerto Rican Football Federation) Escuela de Fútbol Taurinos de Cayey |
| 20 | MF | Ashley McMahon | 18 June 2006 (aged 15) | (Antigua and Barbuda Football Association) World Class FC |
| 3 | FW | Indigo Simms | 22 December 2005 (aged 16) | (United States Soccer Federation) DKSC |
| 10 | FW | Madison Krakower | 7 March 2005 (aged 17) | (United States Soccer Federation) Cedar Stars Academy Monmouth |
| 15 | FW | Mariliana Nieves-Melchor | 10 February 2006 (aged 16) | (United States Soccer Federation) Charlotte Soccer Academy |
| 18 | FW | Valeria Luzio | 22 March 2006 (aged 16) | (Puerto Rican Football Federation) Bayamón FC |

=== Costa Rica ===
The squad was announced on 18 April 2022.

Head coach: Patricia Aguilar

| No. | Pos. | Player | Date of birth (age) | Club |
|---|---|---|---|---|
| 1 | GK | Génesis Pérez | 4 May 2005 (aged 16) | (United States Soccer Federation) Montverde Academy |
| 18 | GK | Valeria Delgado | 19 August 2005 (aged 16) | (Costa Rican Football Federation) Sporting FC |
| 2 | DF | Brittany Vásquez | 21 August 2006 (aged 15) | (Costa Rican Football Federation) Municipal Grecia |
| 3 | DF | Joselyn Briceño | 14 March 2005 (aged 17) | (Costa Rican Football Federation) Sporting FC |
| 4 | DF | Jimena Rodríguez | 3 August 2005 (aged 16) | (Costa Rican Football Federation) Alajuelense |
| 12 | DF | Valentina Rivera | 25 August 2006 (aged 15) | (Costa Rican Football Federation) Saprissa FF |
| 15 | DF | Keishlyn Mena | 12 October 2005 (aged 16) | (Costa Rican Football Federation) AD Chorotega FF |
| 20 | DF | Sara Ramírez | 18 December 2006 (aged 15) | (Costa Rican Football Federation) Academia Cubujuqui |
| 5 | MF | Jimena Jiménez | 27 July 2006 (aged 15) | (Costa Rican Football Federation) Saprissa FF |
| 6 | MF | Priscilla Rodríguez | 26 May 2005 (aged 16) | (Costa Rican Football Federation) Saprissa FF |
| 8 | MF | Luciana González | 14 February 2005 (aged 17) | (Costa Rican Football Federation) CS Herediano |
| 10 | MF | Sheika Scott | 22 October 2006 (aged 15) | (Costa Rican Football Federation) Municipal Pococí |
| 11 | MF | Verónica Matarrita | 7 November 2005 (aged 16) | (Costa Rican Football Federation) AD Chorotega FF |
| 13 | MF | Ashly González | 31 December 2005 (aged 16) | (Costa Rican Football Federation) Sporting FC |
| 14 | MF | Marian Solano | 19 May 2006 (aged 15) | (Costa Rican Football Federation) Alajuelense |
| 16 | MF | Mónica Matarrita | 7 November 2005 (aged 16) | (Costa Rican Football Federation) AD Chorotega FF |
| 19 | MF | Sharon Lobo | 2 November 2005 (aged 16) | (Costa Rican Football Federation) Alajuelense |
| 7 | FW | Ashley Elizondo | 11 January 2005 (aged 17) | (Costa Rican Football Federation) Municipal Pococí |
| 9 | FW | Yoselin Fonseca | 16 April 2005 (aged 17) | (Costa Rican Football Federation) Sporting FC |
| 17 | FW | Tanisha Fonseca | 5 November 2007 (aged 14) | (Costa Rican Football Federation) Sporting FC |

=== United States ===
The squad was announced on 11 April 2022. Melanie Barcenas was named to the initial 20-player roster, but due to an ankle injury, was replaced prior to the tournament by forward Taylor Suarez.

Head coach: Natalia Astrain

| No. | Pos. | Player | Date of birth (age) | Club |
|---|---|---|---|---|
| 1 | GK | Abigail Gundry | 10 March 2005 (aged 17) | (United States Soccer Federation) NC Courage |
| 12 | GK | Victoria Safradin | 23 April 2005 (aged 17) | (United States Soccer Federation) Internationals SC |
| 2 | DF | Nicola Fraser | 25 January 2005 (aged 17) | (United States Soccer Federation) Real Colorado National |
| 3 | DF | Savannah King | 7 February 2005 (aged 17) | (United States Soccer Federation) LAFC So Cal Youth |
| 4 | DF | Cameron Roller | 21 June 2005 (aged 16) | (United States Soccer Federation) Solar SC |
| 5 | DF | Keegan Schmeiser | 19 August 2005 (aged 16) | (United States Soccer Federation) Chicago FC United |
| 17 | DF | Alyssa Gonzalez | 6 May 2005 (aged 16) | (United States Soccer Federation) San Diego Surf |
| 20 | DF | Gisele Thompson | 2 December 2005 (aged 16) | (United States Soccer Federation) Total Futbol Academy |
| 7 | MF | Riley Jackson | 2 December 2005 (aged 16) | (United States Soccer Federation) Concorde Fire |
| 8 | MF | Charlotte Kohler | 18 October 2005 (aged 16) | (United States Soccer Federation) Mountain View Los Altos |
| 10 | MF | Mia Bhuta | 29 December 2005 (aged 16) | (United States Soccer Federation) Internationals SC |
| 13 | MF | Claire Hutton | 11 January 2006 (aged 16) | (United States Soccer Federation) World Class FC |
| 15 | MF | Shae Harvey | 1 March 2005 (aged 17) | (United States Soccer Federation) Slammers FC HB Køge |
| 19 | MF | Lauren Martinho | 9 October 2005 (aged 16) | (United States Soccer Federation) NC Courage |
| 6 | FW | Mia Oliaro | 27 June 2005 (aged 16) | (United States Soccer Federation) NC Courage |
| 9 | FW | Taylor Suarez | 27 July 2005 (aged 16) | (United States Soccer Federation) Charlotte SA |
| 11 | FW | Nicollette Kiorpes | 9 September 2005 (aged 16) | (United States Soccer Federation) NEFC |
| 14 | FW | Melina Rebimbas | 4 May 2005 (aged 16) | (United States Soccer Federation) PDA |
| 16 | FW | Amalia Villarreal | 27 March 2006 (aged 16) | (United States Soccer Federation) Michigan Jaguars FC |
| 18 | FW | Onyeka Gamero | 23 February 2006 (aged 16) | (United States Soccer Federation) Beach FC |

== Group H ==
=== Cuba ===
Head coach: Midel Logal

| No. | Pos. | Player | Date of birth (age) | Club |
|---|---|---|---|---|
| 1 | GK | Yailianni Jiménez | 3 June 2005 (aged 16) | (Football Association of Cuba) FC Cienfuegos |
| 12 | GK | Chaila Hernández | 16 July 2006 (aged 15) | (Football Association of Cuba) FC Artemisa |
| 2 | DF | Yarelmys Días | 25 December 2005 (aged 16) | (Football Association of Cuba) FC Villa Clara |
| 3 | DF | Estefanía Martínez | 8 November 2005 (aged 16) | (Football Association of Cuba) La Habana |
| 4 | DF | Lianet Franco | 14 January 2005 (aged 17) | (Football Association of Cuba) FC Santiago de Cuba |
| 5 | DF | Liz Herrera | 23 April 2005 (aged 17) | (Football Association of Cuba) FC Granma |
| 13 | DF | Sheila Vega | 24 January 2005 (aged 17) | (Football Association of Cuba) FC Granma |
| 14 | DF | Ariannis Robert | 11 October 2005 (aged 16) | Unattached |
| 20 | DF | Yenifer Aguilera | 25 March 2007 (aged 15) | (Football Association of Cuba) FC Holguín |
| 6 | MF | Chanel Aguilera | 14 November 2005 (aged 16) | (Football Association of Cuba) Las Tunas FC |
| 8 | MF | Yesela Castillo | 2 December 2005 (aged 16) | (Football Association of Cuba) FC Camagüey |
| 10 | MF | Samanta Odalis | 11 July 2007 (aged 14) | (Football Association of Cuba) FC Cienfuegos |
| 15 | MF | Keila Vega | 29 April 2007 (aged 14) | (Football Association of Cuba) FC Granma |
| 16 | MF | Kennys Arocha | 4 April 2006 (aged 16) | (Football Association of Cuba) La Habana |
| 17 | MF | Dailis Paz | 8 January 2005 (aged 17) | (Football Association of Cuba) Guantánamo |
| 7 | FW | Dalia Ledesma | 5 July 2006 (aged 15) | (Football Association of Cuba) FC Artemisa |
| 9 | FW | Ainachy Montalvo | 17 October 2005 (aged 16) | (Football Association of Cuba) FC Camagüey |
| 11 | FW | Melany Pino | 4 March 2007 (aged 15) | (Football Association of Cuba) FC Camagüey |
| 18 | FW | Yenifer Cordero | 28 April 2007 (aged 14) | (Football Association of Cuba) FC Artemisa |
| 19 | FW | Rut Vargas | 15 July 2005 (aged 16) | (Football Association of Cuba) FC Santiago de Cuba |

=== Haiti ===
The squad was announced on 21 April 2022.

Head coach: Harold Edma

| No. | Pos. | Player | Date of birth (age) | Club |
|---|---|---|---|---|
| 1 | GK | Rosemanie Joseph | 7 January 2005 (aged 17) | (Haitian Football Federation) Academie Camp Nou |
| 12 | GK | Sarah Évangéliste | 2 January 2005 (aged 17) | (Haitian Football Federation) AS Tigresses |
| 3 | DF | Rastalie Océan | 25 November 2006 (aged 15) | (Haitian Football Federation) AS Tigresses |
| 8 | DF | Nerlie Similien | 16 August 2005 (aged 16) | (Haitian Football Federation) Academie Camp Nou |
| 13 | DF | Dyolanda César | 8 May 2005 (aged 16) | (Haitian Football Federation) Academie Camp Nou |
| 17 | DF | Rose Carline Xavier | 22 March 2005 (aged 17) | (Haitian Football Federation) Academie Camp Nou |
| 19 | DF | Wideline Charles | 20 February 2005 (aged 17) | (Haitian Football Federation) AS Tigresses |
| 4 | MF | Pierreline Senat | 9 March 2005 (aged 17) | (Haitian Football Federation) Academie Camp Nou |
| 5 | MF | Fabiola Saint-Fleur | 19 January 2005 (aged 17) | (Haitian Football Federation) AS Tigresses |
| 6 | MF | Dachelle Compère | 26 July 2005 (aged 16) | (Haitian Football Federation) Academie Camp Nou |
| 11 | MF | Chritlove Caramus | 27 November 2007 (aged 14) | (Haitian Football Federation) Aigle Brillant |
| 14 | MF | Ancie-Love Houanche | 7 October 2005 (aged 16) | (Haitian Football Federation) Academie Camp Nou |
| 15 | MF | Rose-Bertude Rosinvil | 18 April 2005 (aged 17) | (Haitian Football Federation) Academie Camp Nou |
| 20 | MF | Mirlanda Jean | 6 March 2005 (aged 17) | (Haitian Football Federation) Academie Camp Nou |
| 2 | FW | Ketchmay Mitchel | 28 October 2005 (aged 16) | (Haitian Football Federation) Academie Camp Nou |
| 7 | FW | Walandjina Cyriaque | 15 September 2005 (aged 16) | (Haitian Football Federation) Academie Camp Nou |
| 9 | FW | Mise André Dorcelus | 4 March 2006 (aged 16) | (Haitian Football Federation) Academie Camp Nou |
| 10 | FW | Dadie-Love Cherenfant | 30 October 2005 (aged 16) | (Haitian Football Federation) Academie Camp Nou |
| 16 | FW | Ronise Joseph | 30 March 2005 (aged 17) | (Haitian Football Federation) AS Tigresses |
| 18 | FW | Wadia Justin Chery | 3 September 2005 (aged 16) | (Haitian Football Federation) Academie Camp Nou |

=== Guatemala ===
The squad was announced on 20 April 2022.

Head coach: Conrado Paredes

| No. | Pos. | Player | Date of birth (age) | Club |
|---|---|---|---|---|
| 1 | GK | Jecca Castellanos | 9 February 2006 (aged 16) | (National Football Federation of Guatemala) Unifut-Rosal |
| 12 | GK | Maria Maldonado | 22 May 2005 (aged 16) | (National Football Federation of Guatemala) Club Deportivo Xela |
| 3 | DF | Wendy Chamalé | 7 December 2005 (aged 16) | (National Football Federation of Guatemala) Unifut-Rosal |
| 2 | DF | Francisca Morales | 26 April 2005 (aged 16) | (National Football Federation of Guatemala) Unifut-Rosal |
| 4 | DF | Ximena Godoy | 16 February 2005 (aged 17) | (National Football Federation of Guatemala) Unifut-Rosal |
| 16 | DF | Katherinne Ortíz | 10 December 2006 (aged 15) | (National Football Federation of Guatemala) Unifut-Rosal |
| 19 | DF | Juliana Reynoso | 9 July 2005 (aged 16) | (National Football Federation of Guatemala) Unifut-Rosal |
| 5 | MF | Hilary Marroquín | 12 September 2005 (aged 16) | (National Football Federation of Guatemala) Unifut-Rosal |
| 14 | MF | Keiny Estrada | 2 August 2005 (aged 16) | (National Football Federation of Guatemala) Unifut-Rosal |
| 8 | MF | Melany García | 27 December 2006 (aged 15) | (National Football Federation of Guatemala) Unifut-Rosal |
| 10 | MF | Dina Polanco | 23 January 2006 (aged 16) | (National Football Federation of Guatemala) Unifut-Rosal |
| 6 | MF | Britany Xuya | 19 February 2006 (aged 16) | (National Football Federation of Guatemala) Unifut-Rosal |
| 11 | MF | Melany Guerra | 2 January 2006 (aged 16) | (National Football Federation of Guatemala) Unifut-Rosal |
| 18 | MF | Georgette Pérez | 26 April 2005 (aged 16) | (National Football Federation of Guatemala) Unifut-Rosal |
| 15 | MF | Flor De María Perla | 15 May 2005 (aged 16) | (National Football Federation of Guatemala) Unifut-Rosal |
| 7 | MF | Sara Soto | 27 January 2005 (aged 17) | (National Football Federation of Guatemala) Unifut-Rosal |
| 13 | MF | Adriana Pop | 20 July 2006 (aged 15) | (National Football Federation of Guatemala) Unifut-Rosal |
| 9 | FW | Karen González | 14 June 2005 (aged 16) | (National Football Federation of Guatemala) Unifut-Rosal |
| 20 | FW | Briana Valenzuela | 8 June 2006 (aged 15) | (National Football Federation of Guatemala) Unifut-Rosal |
| 17 | FW | Stephanie Arrivillaga | 2 May 2006 (aged 15) | (National Football Federation of Guatemala) Unifut-Rosal |

=== El Salvador ===
Head coach: Eric Acuña

| No. | Pos. | Player | Date of birth (age) | Club |
|---|---|---|---|---|
| 1 | GK | Alexandra Jiménez | 4 May 2005 (aged 16) | (Salvadoran Football Federation) Santa Tecla FC |
| 18 | GK | Anna Valenzuela | 1 February 2007 (aged 15) | Unattached |
| 2 | DF | Andrea Recinos | 30 September 2005 (aged 16) | Unattached |
| 3 | DF | Hailey Hernández | 27 June 2007 (aged 14) | (United States Soccer Federation) Legends FC |
| 4 | DF | Sarina Villa | 1 June 2006 (aged 15) | (United States Soccer Federation) DKSC |
| 5 | DF | Cassandra Villafan | 7 December 2005 (aged 16) | (United States Soccer Federation) Virginia Development Academy |
| 17 | DF | Melina Peña | 21 July 2005 (aged 16) | (Salvadoran Football Federation) Adfa San Marcos |
| 20 | DF | Abigail Nuñez | 5 May 2006 (aged 15) | (United States Soccer Federation) Carnegie Vanguard School |
| 6 | MF | Vanessa Romero | 10 February 2005 (aged 17) | (United States Soccer Federation) Houstonians FC |
| 7 | MF | Carolina Ayala | 6 April 2005 (aged 17) | (Salvadoran Football Federation) CD Luis Ángel Firpo |
| 8 | MF | Cynthia Ramirez | 14 July 2005 (aged 16) | (United States Soccer Federation) LA Surf Discovery |
| 10 | MF | Victoria Sánchez | 22 January 2005 (aged 17) | (Salvadoran Football Federation) Instituto Emiliani |
| 13 | MF | Amy Ángel | 23 December 2006 (aged 15) | (United States Soccer Federation) Virginia Development Academy |
| 14 | MF | Anika Berger | 6 January 2005 (aged 17) | (United States Soccer Federation) Virginia Development Academy |
| 15 | MF | Yaneth Sotelo | 28 April 2005 (aged 16) | (Salvadoran Football Federation) Imder |
| 16 | MF | María Portillo | 7 October 2005 (aged 16) | (Salvadoran Football Federation) CD Águila |
| 9 | FW | Breanna Medina | 5 March 2007 (aged 15) | (United States Soccer Federation) Houstonians FC |
| 11 | FW | Mía Arevalo | 9 June 2005 (aged 16) | (United States Soccer Federation) Virginia Development Academy |
| 12 | FW | Karoline Velásquez | 16 October 2006 (aged 15) | |
| 19 | FW | Génesis Esquivel | 21 December 2005 (aged 16) | (Salvadoran Football Federation) Imder |

== Round of 16 ==
=== Curaçao ===
| No. | Pos. | Player | Date of birth (age) | Club |
|---|---|---|---|---|
| 1 | GK | Julainy Thielman | 18 August 2005 (aged 16) | (Curaçao Football Federation) Wishi Marchena |
| 7 | GK | Rushaviana Petronilia | 13 February 2006 (aged 16) | (Curaçao Football Federation) Jong Holland |
| 20 | GK | Shoniqca Olaria | 6 July 2005 (aged 16) | (Curaçao Football Federation) Excellence |
| 2 | DF | Deyanisha Dorcas | 13 January 2005 (aged 17) | (Curaçao Football Federation) Hubentut Fortuna |
| 4 | DF | Kyra Martie | 12 July 2005 (aged 16) | (Curaçao Football Federation) Excellence |
| 6 | DF | Ludmarie Flaneur | 18 April 2005 (aged 17) | (Royal Dutch Football Association) Xerxes |
| 10 | DF | Queenjelly Alexandre | 7 August 2005 (aged 16) | (Curaçao Football Federation) SV Vesta |
| 15 | DF | Kaaisha Constansia | 17 March 2005 (aged 17) | (Curaçao Football Federation) Excellence |
| 16 | DF | Caelyn Hodge | 31 August 2005 (aged 16) | (Curaçao Football Federation) Excellence |
| 18 | DF | Aukje Moerdijk | 19 December 2005 (aged 16) | (Curaçao Football Federation) CV Inter Willemstad |
| 19 | DF | Queennaily Geertruida | 23 October 2006 (aged 15) | (Curaçao Football Federation) Jong Holland |
| 3 | MF | Charnainelys Andrea | 11 August 2005 (aged 16) | (Curaçao Football Federation) SV Vesta |
| 8 | MF | Hassnah Pieters | 13 January 2005 (aged 17) | (Curaçao Football Federation) Red Diamonds |
| 12 | MF | Gionella Calvenhoven | 14 May 2006 (aged 15) | (Curaçao Football Federation) SV Vesta |
| 13 | MF | Lisa Pasman | 16 December 2005 (aged 16) | (Curaçao Football Federation) Excellence |
| 14 | MF | Soerianieh Nucatia | 13 November 2006 (aged 15) | (Curaçao Football Federation) Excellence |
| 17 | MF | Kishana Mathilda | 6 April 2006 (aged 16) | (Curaçao Football Federation) Jong Holland |
| 5 | FW | Gervionna Martina | 31 January 2006 (aged 16) | (Curaçao Football Federation) Jong Colombia |
| 9 | FW | Raengelly Keller | 16 November 2005 (aged 16) | (Curaçao Football Federation) Excellence |
| 11 | FW | Draynishaina Uranie | 29 June 2005 (aged 16) | (Royal Dutch Football Association) VV Spijkenisse |

=== Guyana ===
| No. | Pos. | Player | Date of birth (age) | Club |
|---|---|---|---|---|
| 1 | GK | Nya-Grace Young | 26 January 2006 (aged 16) | (Canadian Soccer Association) Markham SC |
| 14 | GK | Sidney Facey | 8 December 2005 (aged 16) | (Canadian Soccer Association) Unionville SC |
| 4 | DF | Akasha Low-Koan | 29 March 2005 (aged 17) | (The Football Association) Brazilian Girls Football Club |
| 11 | DF | Nikita Wayne | 27 October 2005 (aged 16) | (Guyana Football Federation) Linden FC |
| 13 | DF | Sara Matthies | 21 January 2005 (aged 17) | (Guyana Football Federation) Fruta Conquerors FC |
| 16 | DF | Fayon Harry | 20 October 2007 (aged 14) | (Guyana Football Federation) Fruta Conquerors FC |
| 6 | MF | Sue Edwards | 19 September 2007 (aged 14) | (Guyana Football Federation) Kamarang |
| 7 | MF | Karen Jupiter | 11 September 2005 (aged 16) | (Guyana Football Federation) Fruta Conquerors FC |
| 8 | MF | Anaya Willabus | 2 November 2006 (aged 15) | (United States Soccer Federation) BW Gottschee Soccer |
| 12 | MF | Alexis Bayley | 14 December 2006 (aged 15) | (Canadian Soccer Association) Unionville SC |
| 15 | MF | Maliya Gangadin | 23 September 2007 (aged 14) | (Canadian Soccer Association) Pickering FC |
| 20 | MF | Latoya Williams | 16 December 2006 (aged 15) | (Guyana Football Federation) Bartica FC |
| 2 | FW | Akeelah Vancooten | 26 June 2007 (aged 14) | (Guyana Football Federation) Georgetown ATC |
| 3 | FW | Alyssa Blake | 20 April 2005 (aged 17) | (United States Soccer Federation) Alleycats SC |
| 5 | FW | Anika Sproxton | 11 January 2005 (aged 17) | (Canadian Soccer Association) Caledon SC |
| 9 | FW | Sandra Johnson | 2 January 2005 (aged 17) | (Guyana Football Federation) Fruta Conquerors FC |
| 10 | FW | Jalade Trim | 27 June 2005 (aged 16) | (Guyana Football Federation) Kwakwani FC |
| 17 | FW | Anostasha Coppin | 10 August 2005 (aged 16) | (Guyana Football Federation) Orealla Falcons FC |
| 18 | FW | Odelli Straughn | 29 November 2005 (aged 16) | (Guyana Football Federation) Fruta Conquerors FC |
| 19 | FW | Ciara Sarius | 13 January 2006 (aged 16) | (Guyana Football Federation) Orealla Falcons FC |

=== Honduras ===
| No. | Pos. | Player | Date of birth (age) | Club |
|---|---|---|---|---|
| 1 | GK | Ashley Fonseca | 3 October 2005 (aged 16) | (United States Soccer Federation) Florida United |
| 12 | GK | Nathalie Urrutia | 20 March 2007 (aged 15) | (National Autonomous Federation of Football of Honduras) FC Motagua |
| 2 | DF | Daniela Zúñiga | 10 August 2006 (aged 15) | (National Autonomous Federation of Football of Honduras) Platense Junior |
| 10 | DF | Sheylla Cortéz | 11 September 2006 (aged 15) | (National Autonomous Federation of Football of Honduras) FC Motagua |
| 13 | DF | Ashley Flores | 15 July 2007 (aged 14) | |
| 14 | DF | Ailín Gómez | 2 March 2006 (aged 16) | (National Autonomous Federation of Football of Honduras) Eurosport |
| 16 | DF | Stella Guifarro | 10 June 2005 (aged 16) | (National Autonomous Federation of Football of Honduras) Academia Guifarro |
| 27 | DF | Anyeli Rodríguez | 2 March 2006 (aged 16) | (National Autonomous Federation of Football of Honduras) FC Motagua |
| 32 | DF | Iveth Ramos | 20 December 2005 (aged 16) | (National Autonomous Federation of Football of Honduras) CD Marathón |
| 6 | MF | Karla Calix | 27 November 2005 (aged 16) | (National Autonomous Federation of Football of Honduras) Puma |
| 7 | MF | Alessandra Canahuati | 16 February 2006 (aged 16) | (National Autonomous Federation of Football of Honduras) CD Marathón |
| 8 | MF | Ericka Cárdenas | 7 June 2006 (aged 15) | (National Autonomous Federation of Football of Honduras) CD Olimpia |
| 9 | MF | Mirian Domínguez | 28 November 2006 (aged 15) | (National Autonomous Federation of Football of Honduras) AFFI |
| 15 | MF | Ariana Guevara | 30 November 2006 (aged 15) | (National Autonomous Federation of Football of Honduras) CD Olimpia |
| 17 | MF | Susan Henríquez | 26 December 2005 (aged 16) | (National Autonomous Federation of Football of Honduras) Villas del Rosario Femenino |
| 25 | MF | Esther Meza | 17 May 2005 (aged 16) | (National Autonomous Federation of Football of Honduras) Universidad Femenino |
| 4 | FW | Larissa Arias | 7 October 2005 (aged 16) | (National Autonomous Federation of Football of Honduras) Universidad Femenino |
| 21 | FW | Geleen López | 21 July 2006 (aged 15) | (National Autonomous Federation of Football of Honduras) Tigers Femenino |
| 23 | FW | Natalie Martínez | 21 February 2007 (aged 15) | (National Autonomous Federation of Football of Honduras) CD Marathón |
| 31 | FW | Jaylen Vallecillo | 23 April 2006 (aged 16) | (United States Soccer Federation) East Meadow Soccer |

=== Saint Kitts and Nevis ===
| No. | Pos. | Player | Date of birth (age) | Club |
|---|---|---|---|---|
| 1 | GK | Tatyanna Daley | 20 April 2006 (aged 16) | Unattached |
| 9 | GK | Ky-Moyen Grant | 26 August 2006 (aged 15) | (St. Kitts and Nevis Football Association) Bath United |
| 18 | GK | Jahzara Andrews | 26 August 2005 (aged 16) | (St. Kitts and Nevis Football Association) Newtown United FC |
| 4 | DF | J'Nelle Gerald | 15 January 2007 (aged 15) | (St. Kitts and Nevis Football Association) Nagico Cayon FC |
| 5 | DF | Shania Henry | 12 July 2005 (aged 16) | (St. Kitts and Nevis Football Association) Newtown United FC |
| 13 | DF | Jah'reynell Leader | 10 June 2006 (aged 15) | Unattached |
| 15 | DF | Keira Francis | 17 December 2007 (aged 14) | (St. Kitts and Nevis Football Association) Garden Hotspurs FC |
| 16 | DF | Kenishqua Liburd | 6 October 2006 (aged 15) | Unattached |
| 2 | MF | Hadiya Bryan | 6 August 2007 (aged 14) | Unattached |
| 6 | MF | Sharema Blake | 1 September 2007 (aged 14) | (St. Kitts and Nevis Football Association) Village Superstars FC |
| 7 | MF | Mikayla Gumbs | 21 April 2006 (aged 16) | Unattached |
| 8 | MF | Kayzg Boyles | 23 November 2006 (aged 15) | (St. Kitts and Nevis Football Association) Newtown United FC |
| 14 | MF | Keviana Williams | 17 December 2007 (aged 14) | (St. Kitts and Nevis Football Association) Garden Hotspurs FC |
| 19 | MF | Tia Nisbett | 20 May 2006 (aged 15) | (St. Kitts and Nevis Football Association) Garden Hotspurs FC |
| 20 | MF | Kayla Uddenberg | 24 October 2006 (aged 15) | (Canadian Soccer Association) Aurora FC |
| 3 | FW | C'Quinna Dasent | 18 December 2007 (aged 14) | (St. Kitts and Nevis Football Association) Garden Hotspurs FC |
| 10 | FW | Jahzara Claxton | 12 March 2006 (aged 16) | (St. Kitts and Nevis Football Association) Newtown United FC |
| 12 | FW | Kionna Mills | 20 December 2006 (aged 15) | (St. Kitts and Nevis Football Association) Newtown United FC |
| 17 | FW | Niclaire Sharry | 26 August 2005 (aged 16) | (St. Kitts and Nevis Football Association) Newtown United FC |
