= 2016 GFA Premier Division =

GFA Premier Division
- Season: 2016
- Champions: Hard Rock
- Relegated: Boca Juniors; Gouyave
- CFU Club Championship: Hard Rock; St. John's
- Matches: 90
- Goals: 330 (3.67 per match)
- Biggest home win: HDR 5–0 GYV (20 Aug 2016); MTR 6–1 CHT (5 Oct 2016)
- Biggest away win: GYV 1–6 QPR (4 Sept 2016)
- Highest scoring: PAR 4–3 GYV

The 2016 GFA Premier Division was the 33rd season of top-division football in Grenada. The regular season competition began on 10 June 2016 and concluded on 23 October 2016.

The playoffs were scheduled to begin in December 2016, with the first legs of the semifinals being held on 11 December 2016 and the second legs on 14 December 2016. The final and consolation matches were scheduled for 18 December 2016, but were not played. This was due to a double forfeit between Mount Rich and Paradise FC International as both their games were unplayed. By default, Hard Rock won the league title after beating St. John's Sports 4–0 on aggregate in their semifinal series. St. John's was the default runner-up.

Both St. John's and Hard Rock earned berths into the 2017 CFU Club Championship, but ended up not participating in the competition.

== Teams ==
A total of 10 teams are taking part in the league. New Hampshire United and GBSS were relegated to the GFA First Division. The two clubs that replaced them were Mount Rich and Gouyave. Mount Rich is returned to the top flight for the first time since 2014, while Gouyave was making their inaugural campaign in the top division.

Location of teams in the GFA Premier Division 2016

Club	Location	Venue	Capacity
Boca Juniors	The Bocas	La Borie Field	200
Carib Hurricane	Victoria	Alston George Park	1,000
Chantimelle	Chantimelle	Chantimelle R.C. School Field	100
Fontenoy United	St. George's	National Cricket Stadium	20,000
Gouyave	Gouyave	Cutbert Peters Park	400
Hard Rock	Sauteurs	Fond Recreation Ground	1,000
Mount Rich	Morne Fendue	Central Point Field	150
Paradise	Paradise	Progress Park	1,000
Queens Park Rangers	St. George's	Grenada National Stadium	10,000
St. John's	Gouyave	Cutbert Peters Park	400

== Regular Stage ==
Pos	Team	Pld	W	D	L	GF	GA	GD	Pts	Qualification or relegation
1	Paradise	18	13	5	0	48	23	+25	44	Qualify for Championship Playoff
2	Hard Rock (C)	18	12	3	3	43	19	+24	39	Qualify for Championship Playoff
3	St. John's Sports	18	9	6	3	40	29	+11	33	Qualify for Championship Playoff
4	Mount Rich	18	7	6	5	38	30	+8	27	Qualify for Championship Playoff
5	Carib Hurricane	18	6	6	6	24	24	0	24	
6	Queens Park Rangers	18	4	8	6	35	33	+2	20	
7	Chantimelle (O)	18	4	5	9	26	38	−12	17	Qualification to Relegation playoffs
8	Fontenoy United (R)	18	4	4	10	31	45	−14	16	Qualification to Relegation playoffs
9	Boca Juniors (R)	18	2	7	9	26	42	−16	13	Relegation to GFA First Division
10	Gouyave (R)	18	3	2	13	19	47	−28	11	Relegation to GFA First Division

Source: https://www.rsssf.org/tablesg/grenada2016.html
(C) Champions;
(O) Play-off winners;
(R) Relegated

== Post-season ==
=== Relegation Playoff ===
The 7th and 8th placed 2016 GFA Premier Division teams, Chantimelle and Fontenoy United, respectively played in a two-leg aggregate series against the third and fourth-place finishers of the 2016 GFA First Division, Eagles Super Strikers and North Stars, respectively.

==== Results ====
18 December 2016

Eagles Super Strikers	1–1	Fontenoy United

Fond Recreation Ground, Sauteurs
21 December 2016

Fontenoy United	0–1	Eagles Super Strikers

National Cricket Stadium, Gouyave

Eagles Super Strikers won 2–1 on aggregate and were promoted to the GFA Premier Division.

19 March 2017

North Stars	1–5	Chantimelle

26 March 2017

Chantimelle	4–1	North Stars

Chantimelle R.C. School Field, Chantimelle

Chantimelle won 9–1 on aggregate and remained in the GFA Premier Division.
