= Chantimelle FC =

Association football club in Grenada

- Full name: Chantimelle Football Club
- Ground: Chantimelle R.C. School Field, Chantimelle
- Capacity: 1000
- League: GFA Premier Division
- 2016: 7th
- Website: http://chantifootball.com/

Chantimelle FC is a Grenadian football club from Chantimelle, Saint Patrick Parish that plays in the Grenada Premier Division.
