= Elite Clubs National League =

Youth soccer league in the United States

- Founded: 2009 (girls); 2017 (boys)
- Country: United States
- Confederation: CONCACAF
- Number of clubs: 127 (girls); 165 (boys)
- Current champions: Overall Club Championship; Girls: Slammers FC HB Køge (7th title); Boys: Crossfire Premier SC (3rd title)
- Most championships: Overall Club Championship; Girls: Slammers FC HB Køge (7 titles); Boys: Crossfire Premier SC (3 titles)
- Website: www.theecnl.com

The Elite Clubs National League (ECNL) is a national youth soccer developmental league in the United States. It was founded in 2009 as a girls' league and added a boys' league in 2017.

== Competition format ==
The ECNL is divided by age groups from U-13 through U-19, and into nine (girls') or ten (boys') regional conferences of nine to 16 clubs. Clubs play regular season matches within their conferences, and top teams and wildcards can qualify for a post-season national round-robin champions' league competition. Winners of the group stage compete in a finals tournament for the title of national champion.

ECNL clubs also compete in tournaments that invite clubs from other leagues, such as the Surf Cup operated by Surf Cup Sports, itself a licensee of several ECNL clubs.

The ECNL host national showcase events to provide additional competition and recruitment opportunities. On the first night of the event, there is the Continental Tire ECNL National and Regional League Selection Game where players from all teams in attendance are selected to play in an "all-star" game.

== Operation ==
The ECNL is a nonprofit organization composed of member clubs, with an elected board of directors that approves budgets, competition rules, and the admission of new members.

=== Broadcasting ===
ECNL matches have been nationally broadcast by ESPNU and ESPN3. ECNL matches are also streamed on Hudl.

=== Player costs ===
Costs to ECNL players can vary widely between clubs. Coaches not near ECNL clubs criticize the costs of playing for the league as a barrier for development in the sport and a factor in reducing the racial and economic diversity among elite United States soccer players. Since its founding and continuing as of June 2015, the estimated average cost to play for an ECNL team was $3,000 to $10,000 per year.

=== Conflicts with high school soccer ===
The ECNL doesn't prohibit its club players from also playing for high school soccer teams, and its season doesn't overlap with high school seasons. However, players and clubs alike reported challenges with players attempting to play for both, including scheduling conflicts, costs, injury risks, and strains on players' performances. The highly competitive nature of club soccer in the United States, and at times specifically the ECNL, is a subject of debate among high school athletes. The ECNL also facilitates collegiate coaches and scouts having access to recruit players, including those who haven't started high school, by accommodating them at ECNL tournaments.

== Sponsorship ==
The ECNL girls' league has been sponsored by Nike since 2010. The partnership includes Nike retail presences at girls' ECNL events and national training camps held at Nike World Headquarters in Beaverton, Oregon.

In March 2019, the ECNL announced that PUMA would sponsor the ECNL boys' league.

== Oversight ==
The U.S. Soccer Federation designates US Club Soccer, a non-profit national association member of the federation, as overseer of the ECNL's girls' and boys' leagues as well as other youth leagues in the United States.

== History ==
=== Foundation ===
The ECNL was founded as a girls' soccer league in March 2009 during a meeting of 40 founding clubs. Its founding was inspired in part by frustrations experienced by clubs and coaches with older volunteer-driven organizations, such US Youth Soccer and the American Youth Soccer Organization, in favor of a more professionalized approach.

Christian Lavers is a league founder, and as of November 2022 served as both president and CEO of the ECNL, executive vice president of US Club Soccer, vice president of US Club Soccer management services client C2SA, and owner and club director for Wisconsin ECNL club FC Wisconsin. Lavers also served as director of sport and chief soccer officer of top-flight women's professional club Kansas City Current in the National Women's Soccer League (NWSL).

=== Expansion ===
The ECNL expanded to 52 clubs in 2010 and 66 in 2011. The organization created a boys' league in 2017, adding 57 founding clubs. The ECNL also has a Pre-ECNL league, which is focused on developing younger players for future competition in the ECNL. The age groups for Pre-ECNL range from U9-U12. This league has high competition, but has much more limited travel compared to the ECNL due to the age of athletes.

By 2019, the ECNL girls' league had 94 clubs and boys' league had 90 clubs. After the shutdown of the U.S. Soccer Development Academy in 2020, the girls' league expanded to 113 clubs and boys' league to 131 clubs.

Public filings indicated that the league's revenue grew from $500,000 in 2010 to $3.4 million in 2019.

=== Competition with Development Academy ===
In 2017, the United States Soccer Federation announced the launch of a 74-club girls' academy within the U.S. Soccer Development Academy (DA) organization, in addition to its boys' academy. This program competed directly with the ECNL, which launched its own boys' academy in the same year and brought the ECNL and DA into direct nationwide competition for youth soccer clubs. Additionally, ECNL regularly competes with other leagues such as MLS Next and NAL.

The Development Academy prevented players from playing high school soccer, while the ECNL allowed it.

In 2019, top boys' and girls' clubs from the DA, all-star teams drawn from the ECNL and other domestic youth clubs, and youth clubs from FC Barcelona, Paris Saint-Germain, Atletico Madrid, and Manchester City F.C. competed in the second International Champions Cup Futures Tournament, staged by Relevent Sports Group alongside their senior professional 2019 Women's International Champions Cup. The tournament took place from December 11 to December 15, 2019, at IMG Academy in Bradenton, Florida.

=== COVID-19 pandemic ===
U.S. Soccer closed the DA on April 15, 2020, citing financial difficulties related to the pandemic, and some of the former DA clubs joined the ECNL.

The ECNL scheduled the start of its first season during the COVID-19 pandemic for August 1, 2020, for clubs in jurisdictions that allowed youth sports.

In September 2020, ECNL medical director Drew Watson organized a nationwide study of member clubs to track the spread of COVID-19 among players returning to practice and better understand the potential risks of transmission. The study encompassed 90,000 players and reported a positive case rate of 310 per 100,000 children.

In a separate study, Watson suggested that the COVID-19 pandemic had also increased rates of anxiety and depression reported by athletes.

=== 2021 abuse scandal ===
In a Washington Post report published February 2022, several former players of ECNL founding club Chicago Eclipse Select accused its coach Rory Dames, who also served on the league's board of directors, of sexual harassment and verbal abuse of youth players, and other abuses of power. The report also alleged that Dames hired a coach for Eclipse who had previously been sanctioned by the U.S. Center for SafeSport for sexual harassment of youth players. Dames denied the allegations through his attorney. The report followed a separate media report alleging similar behavior by Dames in his role as head coach of senior NWSL pro club Chicago Red Stars, which became part of the 2021 NWSL abuse scandal and led to two separate investigations into alleged abuses within the league, including Dames. US Club Soccer disqualified Dames from coaching in November 2021 following the NWSL reports. Dames also resigned as president of Eclipse Select.

The Report of the Independent Investigation to the U.S. Soccer Federation Concerning Allegations of Abusive Behavior and Sexual Misconduct in Women's Professional Soccer, an independent report by Sally Yates commissioned by U.S. Soccer in 2021, noted that other ECNL club administrators were associated with other abuse allegations, either directly or indirectly. The report included complaints of a "fear-based" environment made by players against Aaran Lines for his tenure as head coach of the Western New York Flash, and the report also noted that Lines had remained a member of the Flash organization as director of its ECNL team. The Yates Report referenced an unnamed coach who had been sanctioned by the U.S. Center for SafeSport for making "sexually explicit remarks to high school players" but was allowed to be hired as director of coaching for an unnamed ECNL team. The report also covered the founding and coaching directing of ECNL club Albertson Soccer Club by Paul Riley until April 2020, who was also accused of sexual and verbal abuse of professional senior players during his tenures coaching in multiple leagues. The NWSL club North Carolina Courage subsequently fired Riley, and U.S. Soccer subsequently suspended Riley's coaching license.

In January 2023, the NWSL permanently banned Riley and Dames from coaching in the league as a result of its joint investigation with the NWSL Players Association.

=== Allegations of systemic gender bias ===
In a report published by the Washington Post in November 2022, 24 current and former ECNL coaches raised concerns about a systemic lack of advancement opportunities for women working in ECNL, as well as discrimination and harassment. The report noted that 90 percent of directors of coaching at 129 ECNL clubs were male, and included claims by former Scotland and United Kingdom international Ifeoma Dieke, who had worked for an ECNL club and alleged that the league's exclusion of women from leadership roles was "a systemic problem". The ECNL and several of the clubs named in the report responded by denying the allegations or dismissing the complaints, and the league's chief operating officer Jennifer Winnagle stated that more than half of the league's front office staff was female. US Club Soccer responded to requests to comment with a statement indicating pride in the work of US Club Soccer and its member organizations for female youth soccer.

== Champions ==
=== Overall Club Championship ===
Season	Girls	Boys
2009–10	Not awarded	—
2010–11	Eclipse Select SC (IL)	—
2011–12	Slammers FC (CA)	—
2012–13	Players Development Academy (NJ)	—
2013–14	Players Development Academy (NJ)	—
2014–15	Michigan Hawks SC (MI)	—
2015–16	Slammers FC (CA)	—
2016–17	Michigan Hawks SC (MI)	—
2017–18	Sting SC (TX)	Not awarded
2018–19	LAFC Slammers (CA)	Not awarded
2019–20	Cancelled due to the COVID-19 pandemic	Not awarded
2020–21	LAFC Slammers (CA)	San Diego Surf SC (CA)
2021–22	Solar SC (TX)	NASA Tophat (GA)
2022–23	Slammers FC HB Køge (CA)	San Diego Surf SC (CA)
2023–24	San Diego Surf SC (CA)	Crossfire Premier SC (WA)
2024–25	Slammers FC HB Køge (CA)	Crossfire Premier SC (WA)
2025–26	Slammers FC HB Køge (CA)	Crossfire Premier SC (WA)

=== By age group ===
==== Girls ====
Season	U13	U14	U15	U16	U17	U18/19	Sources
2010–11	Not competed	Not competed	Lonestar SC (TX)	Capital Area Soccer League (NC)	San Diego Surf SC (CA)	Kansas City FC Intensity (MO)	
2011–12	Not competed	Arsenal SC (TX)	Colorado Rush SC (CO)	Slammers FC (CA)	Capital Area Soccer League (NC)	Michigan Hawks SC (MI)	
2012–13	Not competed	Players Development Academy (NJ)	Eclipse Select SC (IL)	Sting SC (TX)	Players Development Academy (NJ)	Ohio Premier SC (OH)	
2013–14	Not competed	Michigan Hawks SC (MI)	San Diego Surf SC (CA)	Eclipse Select SC (IL)	Sting SC (TX)	Players Development Academy (NJ)	
2014–15	Not competed	Slammers FC (CA)	Southern California Blues SC (CA)	West Coast FC (CA)	Players Development Academy (NJ)	Michigan Hawks SC (MI)	
2015–16	Not competed	Southern California Blues SC (CA)	Slammers FC (CA)	Players Development Academy (NJ)	Michigan Hawks SC (MI)	Slammers FC (CA)	
2016–17	Not competed	Solar SC (TX)	Southern California Blues SC (CA)	FC Dallas (TX)	Michigan Hawks SC (MI)	Michigan Hawks SC (MI)	
2017–18	Not competed	MVLA SC (CA)	Slammers FC (CA)	Southern California Blues SC (CA)	Southern California Blues SC (CA)	McLean Youth Soccer (VA)	
2018–19	Players Development Academy (NJ)	Players Development Academy (NJ)	Gwinnett Soccer Academy (GA)	Southern California Blues SC (CA)	Players Development Academy (NJ)	Southern California Blues SC (CA)	
2019–20	Cancelled due to the COVID-19 pandemic						
2020–21	LAFC Slammers (CA)	Solar SC (TX)	KC Athletics SC (KS)	LAFC Slammers (CA)	MVLA SC (CA)	Eclipse Select SC (IL)	
2021–22	Solar SC (TX)	Solar SC (TX)	Slammers FC HB Køge (CA)	St. Louis Scott Gallagher SC (MO)	Real Colorado (CO)	Concorde Fire SC (GA)	
2022–23	Slammers FC HB Køge (CA)	Players Development Academy (NJ)	Michigan Hawks SC (MI)	Solar SC (TX)	St. Louis Scott Gallagher SC (MO)	Slammers FC HB Køge (CA)	
2023–24	San Diego Surf SC (CA)	Slammers FC HB Køge (CA)	San Diego Surf SC (CA)	Penn Fusion (PA)	Beach FC (CA)	San Diego Surf SC (CA)	
2024–25	San Diego Surf SC (CA)	San Diego Surf SC (CA)	Michigan Hawks SC (MI)	MVLA SC (CA)	Real Colorado (CO)	Slammers FC HB Køge (CA)	
2025–26	Slammers FC HB Køge (CA)	San Diego Surf SC (CA)	Southern California Blues SC (CA)	Real Colorado (CO)	FC Dallas Youth (TX)	Michigan Hawks SC (MI)	

==== Boys ====
Season	U13	U14	U15	U16	U17	U18/19	Sources
2017–18 (Note: Playoffs known as Elite National Premier League playoffs and organized by US Club Soccer.)	Not competed	Tulsa SC (OK)	Tennessee SC (TN)	GPS Massachusetts (MA) (Note: Non-ECNL team that won the ENPL National Championship.)	Classics Elite SA (TX)	Ohio Premier SC (OH)	
2018–19	Not competed	Eclipse Select SC (IL)	Tulsa SC (OK)	Players Development Academy (NJ)	Beach FC (CA)	NEFC (MA)	
2019–20	Cancelled due to the COVID-19 pandemic						
2020–21	Utah Avalanche SC (UT)	Crossfire Premier SC (WA)	Carolina Elite SA (SC)	Dallas Texans SC (TX)	Eclipse Select SC (IL)	Charlotte Independence SC (NC)	
2021–22	San Diego Surf SC (CA)	Dallas Texans SC (TX)	D'Feeters Kicks SC (TX)	Oklahoma Energy FC (OK)	Pipeline SC (MD)	Crossfire Premier SC (WA)	
2022–23	San Diego Surf SC (CA)	Pipeline SC (MD)	Crossfire Premier SC (WA)	San Diego Surf SC (CA)	Richmond United (VA)	San Diego Surf SC (CA)	
2023–24	Crossfire Premier SC (WA)	LAFC So Cal Youth (CA)	South Carolina Surf SC (SC)	LAFC So Cal Youth (CA)	San Diego Surf SC (CA)	Crossfire Premier SC (WA)	
2024–25	Crossfire Premier SC (WA)	Crossfire Premier SC (WA)	Legends FC (CA)	Florida Premier FC (FL)	Crossfire Premier SC (WA)	Crossfire Premier SC (WA)	
2025–26	Crossfire Premier SC (WA)	LAFC So Cal Youth (CA)	Real Colorado (CO)	Crossfire Premier SC (WA)	Utah Avalanche (UT)	Tulsa SC (OK)	

== Notable alumni ==
=== Girls ===
From 2017 to 2022, 70 percent of players selected in the NWSL Draft to play in the United States's top professional women's league were ECNL club alumni. As of November 2019, more than 60 percent of rostered players in the combined Atlantic Coast Conference, Big Ten Conference, Big 12 Conference, Southeastern Conference, and Pac-12 Conference of NCAA Division I women's soccer were ECNL alumni.

As of April 2023

Player	ECNL club(s)	Pro club(s)	Senior national team	Notes
Hue Menzies (manager)	Florida Kraze Krush	(United States) NJ/NY Gotham FC (interim)	Jamaica	2018 CONCACAF Women's Football Coach of the Year, manager for Jamaica in its first FIFA Women's World Cup appearance
Naomi Girma	De Anza Force	(United States) San Diego Wave FC	United States	2022 NWSL rookie of the year and defender of the year, 2022 CONCACAF W Championship Best XI
Diana Ordoñez	FC Dallas Youth	(United States) Houston Dash	Mexico	Set NWSL record for goals as a rookie in 2022
Jaelin Howell	Real Colorado	(United States) Racing Louisville FC	United States	Scored first senior international goal on April 10, 2022
Mia Fishel	San Diego Surf	(Mexico) Tigres UANL	—	In 2022, became first international player to win the Liga MX Femenil golden boot
Catarina Macario	San Diego Surf	(France) Olympique Lyon	United States	2018 and 2019 Hermann Trophy winner, scored goal clinching Lyon's 2021–22 Division 1 Féminine title, 2021–22 UEFA Women's Champions League winner, first American to score in a UEFA Champions League final, 2020 Tokyo Olympics bronze medalist
Ashley Hatch	Legends FC	(United States) North Carolina Courage (Australia) Melbourne City FC (United States) Washington Spirit	United States	2017 NWSL rookie of the year, 2017 NWSL Shield winner, 2021 NWSL Golden Boot winner, 2021 NWSL champion
Alyssa Thompson	Real So Cal	(United States) Angel City FC	United States	First NWSL player drafted out of high school
Reyna Reyes	FC Dallas Youth	(United States) Portland Thorns FC	Mexico	Debuted for Mexico on February 23, 2021
Lindsey Horan	Colorado Rush SC	(France) Paris Saint-Germain (United States) Portland Thorns FC (France) Olympique Lyon	United States	Scored match-winning goal in the 2017 NWSL championship; 2018 NWSL most valuable player, 2021 U.S. Soccer female player of the year, 2021–22 UEFA Women's Champions League winner, 2020 Tokyo Olympics bronze medalist
Margaret Purce	Freestate Soccer Alliance	(United States) Boston Breakers (United States) Portland Thorns FC (United States) NJ/NY Gotham FC	United States	2021 NWSL Best XI, 2021 NWSL most valuable player nominee
Emily Fox	FC Virginia	(United States) Racing Louisville FC (United States) North Carolina Courage	United States	2021 NWSL Draft 1st overall pick, 2021 NWSL rookie of the year finalist
Sam Coffey	Match Fit Academy	(United States) Portland Thorns FC	United States	2022 NWSL champion, 2022 NWSL Best XI, 2022 CONCACAF W Championship
Allyson Swaby	Connecticut FC	(Iceland) Fjarðab/Höttur/Leiknir (Italy) AS Roma (United States) Angel City FC (France) Paris Saint-Germain	Jamaica	2021 Coppa Italia champion, 2021 Jamaica Football Federation female player of the year
Chantelle Swaby	Connecticut FC	(United States) Sky Blue FC (Scotland) Rangers W.F.C. (France) FC Fleury 91	Jamaica	2021–22 Scottish Women's Premier League champion
Emily Alvarado	Texas Rush	(France) Reims (United States) Houston Dash	Mexico	Earned first senior national team cap with Mexico in 2019
Savannah McCaskill	Carolina Elite Select Academy	(United States) Sky Blue FC (Australia) Sydney FC (United States) Chicago Red Stars (United States) Racing Louisville FC (United States) Angel City FC	United States	2018 NWSL rookie of the year finalist, 2019 W-League champion
Casey Murphy	Players Development Academy Slammers	(France) Montpellier HSC (United States) Reign FC/OL Reign (United States) North Carolina Courage	United States	2022 CONCACAF W Championship
Mallory Swanson	Real Colorado	(United States) Washington Spirit (United States) Sky Blue FC (United States) Chicago Red Stars	United States	2015 U.S. Soccer Young Female Athlete of the Year, 2017 NWSL rookie of the year finalist, 2018 CONCACAF Women's Championship, 2019 FIFA Women's World Cup winner, 2021 NWSL most valuable player finalist, 2022 CONCACAF W Championship, 2022 NWSL Best XI
Trinity Rodman	So Cal Blues	(United States) Washington Spirit	United States	2021 NWSL rookie of the year, 2021 NWSL Best XI, 2021 NWSL champion, 2021 U.S. Soccer Young Female Player of the Year, 2022 Ballon d'Or Féminin nominee, 2022 CONCACAF W Championship
Rose Lavelle	Cincinnati United Premier	(United States) Boston Breakers (United States) Washington Spirit (England) Manchester City (United States) OL Reign	United States	2017 NWSL College Draft first-overall selection, 2019 FIFA Women's World Cup bronze ball, The Best FIFA Football Awards 2019 top XI, 2019 FIFA FIFPro World XI, 2019 NWSL Best XI, 2019–20 Women's FA Cup winner, 2020 Tokyo Olympics bronze medalist, 2022 CONCACAF W Championship Best XI, 2022 NWSL Shield
Hailie Mace	Eagles SC	(Australia) Melbourne City FC (Sweden) FC Rosengård (United States) North Carolina Courage (Sweden) Kristianstads DFF (United States) Kansas City Current	United States	2018 CONCACAF Women's Championship, 2019 Damallsvenskan champion, 2022 NWSL Best XI Second Team

=== Boys ===
As of August 2023

Player	ECNL club(s)	Source
Santiago Castañeda	Florida Premier FC (FL)	
Xavi Gnaulati	San Diego Surf SC (CA)	
Jackson Hopkins	Virginia Development Academy (VA)	
Evan Rotundo	San Diego Surf SC (CA)	
Jimmy Slayton	FSA FC (CT)	
