= Boca Juniors (disambiguation) =

Boca Juniors refers to the popular Argentine football club. Other clubs have been named after it, as well as other things:

- Boca F.C., football club in Belize
- Boca Juniors de Cali, football club in Colombia
- Boca Juniors F.C. (Gibraltar), football club in Gibraltar
- Boca Juniors FC, football club in Grenada
- Boca Juniors de Chiclayo, football club in Chiclayo, Peru
- Boca Río Gallegos, football club in Rio Gallegos, Argentina
- Boca Juniors Reserves and Academy, youth academy of the Argentine club
- Boca Juniors (basketball), basketball team of the Argentine club
- Boca Juniors (women), women's team of the Argentine club
