= Ivan Mršić =

Yugoslav footballer

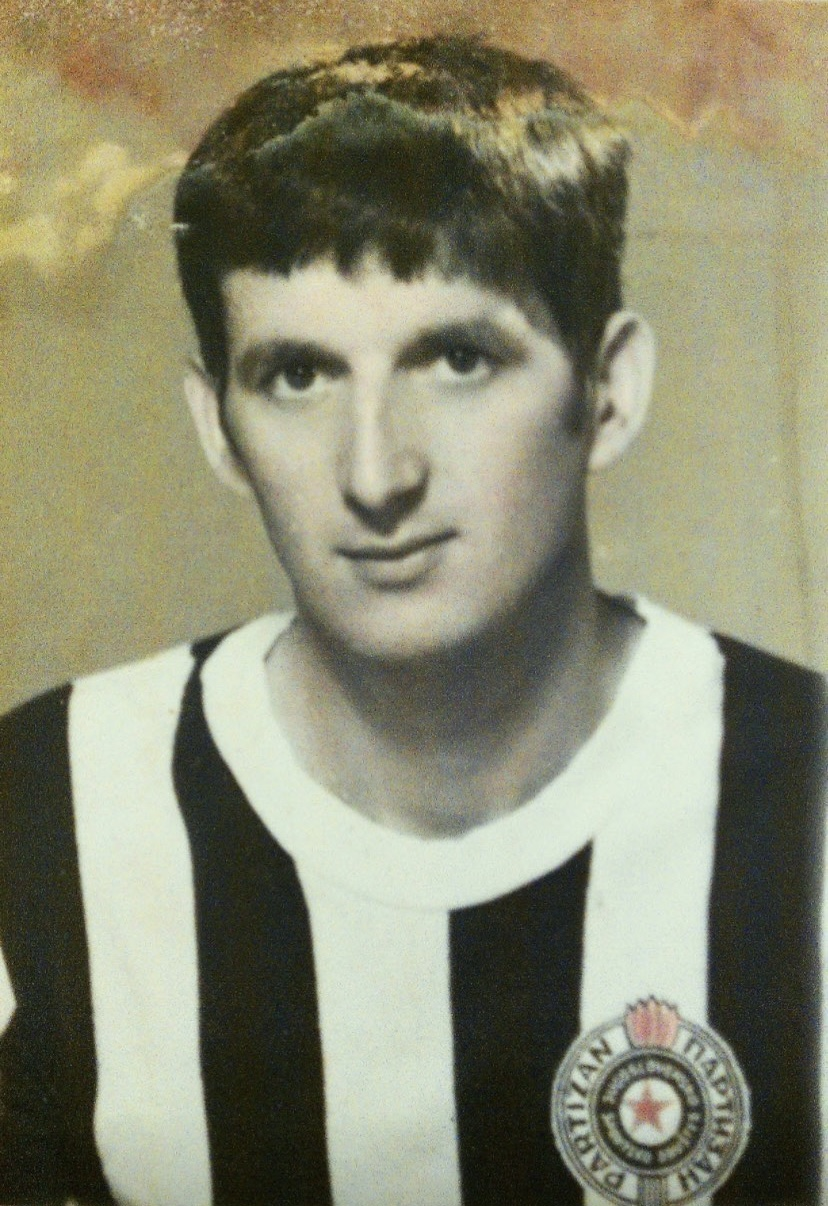
- Mršić with Partizan Belgrade in 1968

Personal information
- Full name: Ivan Jozo Mršić
- Date of birth: August 1, 1949 (age 77)
- Place of birth: Teslić, FPR Yugoslavia
- Height: 1.85 m (6 ft 1 in)
- Position: Striker

Youth career
- 1963–1965: Proleter Teslić

Senior career*
Years	Team	Apps	(Gls)
1965–1966	Proleter Teslić		
1966–1967	Borac Banja Luka		
1967–1968	Slavija Osijek		
1968–1969	Partizan		
1969–1970	Olimpija Ljubljana		
1971–1972	Radnički Kragujevac		
1972–1973	Sloga Doboj		
1973–1975	Jedinstvo Bihać		
1975	Spartak Subotica		
1976	Pelister		
1976	Serbian White Eagles		
1976	Windsor Stars		
1978	Fort Lauderdale Strikers		
1980	Columbus Magic		
1981–1982	Cleveland Force (indoor)		
1982–1983	Toronto Croatia		
- * Club domestic league appearances and goals

Ivan Mršić (born August 1, 1949), also known as John Mrsic and Big J, is a Yugoslav retired footballer.

Born in Teslić, SR Bosnia and Herzegovina, Yugoslavia, he began his career in 1963, with local club FK Proleter Teslić. He was picked up by bigger club FK Borac Banja Luka the next season. He turned down an offer from Croatian Giants HNK Hajduk Split and went on to play with many Yugoslav clubs including three first division clubs NK Olimpija Ljubljana, FK Radnički Kragujevac, and Yugoslav powerhouse FK Partizan although only playing two matches, both friendly. He finished his European career playing with FK Spartak Subotica and FK Pelister in the Yugoslav Second League before coming and playing professional in the United States for Fort Lauderdale Strikers in 1978. After a season he went on to play for ASL's Columbus Magic He also played in the National Soccer League in the summer of 1976 with the Serbian White Eagles and Windsor Stars. In 1981, Mršić signed with the Cleveland Force of the Major Indoor Soccer League. He then moved to Canada where he finished his career with Toronto Croatia.

His son, Simon Mrsic, born 1991, is also a footballer, and has played with San Jose Earthquakes reserve team and of NK Osijek, FK Rudar Prijedor and OFK Bačka.
