= Gouyave FC =

Association football club in Grenada

- Full name: Gouyave Football Club
- Nickname(s): Sharks
- Founded: 2008
- Ground: Cutbert Peters Park, Gouyave
- Capacity: 1,000
- League: GFA First Division
- 2016: Premier Division, 10th (relegated)
Home colours	Away colours	Third colours

Gouyave Football Club is a Grenadian football club based in Gouyave. The club was founded in 2008, and spent most of its history in the lower leagues of Grenada. During the 2016 GFA Premier Division season, Gouyave played, for the first time in their history, in the top flight of Grenadian football.

== Known players ==
- Kacey Smith
- Nakim Straker
- Jamal Charles
