= Rob Becerra =

American soccer coach (born 1976)

Personal information
- Full name: Rob Becerra
- Date of birth: March 15, 1976 (age 50)
- Position: Goalkeeper

Team information
- Current team: New England Revolution (Director of Youth Development)

College career
Years	Team	Apps	(Gls)
- Cal State San Bernardino

Senior career*
Years	Team	Apps	(Gls)
1997	Sacramento Scorpions		

Managerial career
- University of Redlands
- 2006-2011: Stanford (assistant)
- 2014–2017: LA Galaxy II (assistant)
- 2017–2017: LA Galaxy (assistant)
- 2018–2021: San Diego Surf SC (Girls Senior Director of Coaching)
- 2021–: New England Revolution (Director of Youth Development)
- * Club domestic league appearances and goals

Rob Becerra (born March 15, 1976) is an American soccer coach who is the director of youth development for Major League Soccer club New England Revolution. He has held multiple college and professional coaching roles, including at the University of Redlands, Stanford, LA Galaxy II, and the LA Galaxy.

== Early life and playing career ==
In 1997, Becerra earned a Bachelor of Science degree in kinesiology from Cal State San Bernardino. He also starred as a goalkeeper for their soccer team. He later earned his master's degree in management from the University of Redlands. Becerra played for the Sacramento Scorpions of the United Systems of Independent Soccer Leagues.

== Coaching career ==
Becerra began his career as the head coach for the University of Redlands (nicknamed the Bulldogs). He had a 126-28-8 record, which included the program's first NCAA playoff appearance. His time as coach was considered the most successful run in the school's history, and he broke the team's 24-year streak of having non-winning seasons In addition to his head-coaching position, he served as the assistant athletic director and a physical education instructor. In 2006, Becerra began working at Stanford as an assistant coach. He continued in this role until 2011, and during his tenure, 18 of his players received Pac-10 All-Conference honors.

In 2014, Beccera joined the LA Galaxy. Initially, he began as an assistant coach for LA Galaxy II of the USL Championship, under head coach Curt Onalfo. During his time as an assistant, the club reached playoffs in each season, and in 2015 season they won the Western Conference title.

In January 2017, Becerra was named assistant coach of the Galaxy first team, working under newly promoted head coach Curt Onalfo. Onalfo was fired after 20 games, with a 6-10-4 record and ending with the team 9th in the Western Conference. Onalfo was replaced by Sigi Schmid on an interim basis. Even after Onalfo's departure, Becerra continued on with his role as an assistant coach.

In February 2018, Becerra left the Galaxy to join San Diego Surf SC as the Girls Senior Director of Coaching. In 2018, he led the 2005-birth-year team to a national championship. Becerra was accused of sexual harassment during his time in San Diego, which led to a lawsuit against the club in 2021. Becerra was accused of harassing one of his employees, Karley Nelson, who joined the club in 2020. He allegedly told Nelson that she could "sleep with any of the guys in that clubhouse" and made repeated comments about her body. Additionally, the suit alleged that Becerra touched Nelson multiple times. Nelson was told that Becerra would be removed at the end of the season for poor performance, but to her knowledge, he was not reprimanded for the allegations of sexual harassment. Another woman who coached for Surf alleged that Becerra had directed sexist and homophobic jokes at her.

In April 2021, the New England Revolution announced Becerra as the Director of Youth Development, where he would oversee the Revolution Academy across its four age groups. On September 12, 2023, New England Revolution II head coach Clint Peay was announced as interim head coach of the first team, replacing Richie Williams who had been serving in the same role after head coach Bruce Arena was as placed on administrative leave by the team on amid allegations of "insensitive and inappropriate remarks". After Peay changed roles, Becerra was named as manager on the match report for the last four Revolution II games of the season.

Becerra also holds a USSF A License and a Director of Coaching License. In addition to his club roles, he served as a U.S. Soccer's Technical Advisor for the Southwest Division from 2011 to 2014. In 2019, he was an assistant coach with U.S. Men's U-19 Youth National Team.

== Personal life ==
Becerra is married to his wife Samantha, and has two daughters.
