= Simon Mršić =

Soccer player (born 1991)

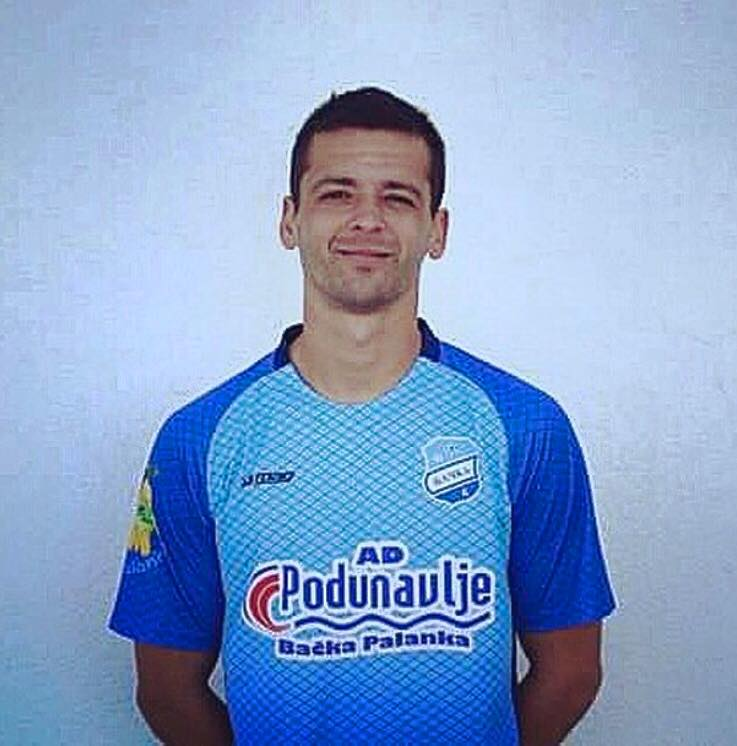
- Simon Mrsic with OFK Bačka

Personal information
- Full name: Simon Mršić
- Date of birth: 18 June 1991 (age 35)
- Place of birth: San Francisco, California, United States
- Height: 1.86 m (6 ft 1 in)
- Positions: Attacking midfielder; forward

Youth career
- San Diego Surf

Senior career*
Years	Team	Apps	(Gls)
2010–2011	San Jose Earthquakes		
2011	Varaždin		
2012–2013	Osijek		
2014	Sloga Doboj		
2014–2015	East Bay Stompers		
2015–2016	Rudar Prijedor		
2016	East Bay Stompers		
2017–2018	OFK Bačka	1	(0)
2020–	Delfines del Este FC	8	
- * Club domestic league appearances and goals as of 29 August 2018

Simon Mršić (born 18 June 1991) is a professional soccer player from the United States of Croatian descent currently playing for Delfines del Este FC in the Liga Dominicana de Fútbol. He is a son of former Yugoslav professional footballer Ivan Mršić.

== Club career ==
At the beginning of his senior career, Mršić was with San Jose Earthquakes. In 2011, he moved to Europe joining Croatian side NK Varaždin for a period, but he left after a short spell due to financial problems at the club causing it to stop paying their players. Later he also spent a period with NK Osijek. Then he returned to the United States where he went on trial with MLS side Columbus Crew, but left the club as well after new administration came to the club. He was also a member of Sloga Doboj in Republika Srpska for a short period in 2014, without official appearances. He returned home to play with East Bay FC Stompers, being a member of the club until 2016 intermittently. In the meantime, he had a contract with Rudar Prijedor, signed after he passed trial period in 2015. At the beginning of 2017, Mršić joined OFK Bačka but due to administrative problems he officially signed with the club in March 2017, being licensed with jersey 26. He made his professional debut for new club in last fixture of the 2016–17 Serbian SuperLiga season, replacing Marko Zečević in 77 minute of the away match against Spartak Subotica, played on 21 May 2017 at the Subotica City Stadium. In the season of 2020 during the COVID-19 pandemic Simon signed with club Delfines del Este FC in Dominican Republic's first division.
