= Boca Juniors FC =

Association football club in Grenada

Boca Juniors
- Full name: Boca Juniors Football Club
- Ground: La Borie Field, The Bocas
- Capacity: 200
- League: GFA First Division
- 2016: Premier Division, 9th (relegated)

Boca Juniors Football Club is a Grenadian football club from The Bocas neighborhood of St. George's, Grenada. The club plays in the Grenada Premier Division.
