= Slammers FC =

Soccer club in Newport Beach, California, U.S.

- Full name: Slammers Futbol Club
- Founded: 1994; 32 years ago
- Ground: Newport Beach, California, United States
- Directors of coaching: Josh Brooks and Pete Aguirre
- Website: slammersfc.org

Slammers Futbol Club, currently also known as Slammers FC HB Køge, is an American youth soccer club based in Newport Beach, California. It is a member of the Elite Clubs National League (ECNL).

== History ==
Slammers was founded by brothers Walid and Ziad Khoury in 1994. As of 2020, the club has won 17 national championships and become one of the most successful youth clubs in the United States. Slammers won the ECNL Girls Overall Club Championship in 2011–12, 2015–16, 2018–19, 2020–21, and 2022–23.

Mia Hamm began coaching for Slammers in 2009, and the Los Angeles FC co-owner brought about a partnership that renamed the youth club LAFC Slammers. Danish club HB Køge announced their partnership with Slammers in 2021, after which the youth club has played teams under the name Slammers FC HB Køge.

== Notable people ==
=== Players ===
- Danesha Adams
- Maddie Bauer
- Julia Bingham
- Ashley Bowyer
- Zakiya Bywaters
- Madison Curry
- Makenzy Doniak
- Whitney Engen
- Haley Hopkins
- Natalie Jacobs
- Savannah King
- Tim Woodcock
- Camille Levin
- Mary Long
- Destinee Manzo
- Kayla Mills
- Jack McBean
- Ashley Nick
- Jenna Nighswonger
- Mariah Nogueira
- Jordan O'Brien
- Kiana Palacios
- Christen Press
- Leah Pruitt
- Tyson Wahl
- Kennedy Wesley
- Kate Wiesner
