= Renatta Cota =

Mexican footballer (born 2005)

Personal information
- Full name: Fedra Renatta Cota Muñoz
- Date of birth: 12 May 2005 (age 21)
- Place of birth: Benito Juárez, Quintana Roo, Mexico
- Height: 1.72 m (5 ft 8 in)
- Position: Goalkeeper

Senior career*
Years	Team	Apps	(Gls)
2022–2025	América	8	(0)
2023–2024	→ León (loan)	32	(0)
2025–2026	Tijuana	6	(0)

International career^{‡}
2023–2024	Mexico U-20		
- * Club domestic league appearances and goals as of 9 February 2026 ‡ National team caps and goals as of 12 March 2022

Fedra Renatta Cota Muñoz (born 12 May 2005) is a Mexican professional footballer who plays as a goalkeeper for Liga MX Femenil side Club Tijuana.

== Career ==
In 2022, she started her career in América. In 2023, was loaned to León.

== International career ==
Since 2023, Cota has been part of the Mexico U-20 team.
