= Sting SC =

Youth soccer club based in Dallas, Texas

- Full name: Sting Soccer Club
- Founded: 1973
- League: Elite Clubs National League; Lake Highlands Girls Classic League

Sting Soccer Club, also known as the Dallas Sting, Sting SC, Sting North Texas, or simply Sting, is an American-based international youth soccer club headquartered in the metropolitan area of Dallas, Texas. Established for competitive amateur girl soccer players, it currently competes in the Elite Clubs National League (ECNL), among others. Founded in 1973, it is the first and oldest all-girls soccer club in the United States.

== History ==
=== 1970s ===
Sting was founded in 1973 by Bill Kinder who, with Lamar Hunt and a few key soccer pioneers put together teams of female athletes at the high school age who played in the newly created Dallas league called the High School Girls Soccer League (which became the Lake Highlands Girls Classic League). Players voted to call themselves the Sting, taking the name from the 1973 hit movie starring Robert Redford and Paul Newman.

In 1976, Sting became the first girls or women's soccer team to travel outside the United States and the first to travel to Mexico. Sting faced Mexico's national champion team in Mexico City, playing before 35,000 fans in Mexico City's Olympic Stadium prior to a division one men's professional match.

In 1977, Sting became the first American girls soccer team to play in Europe, playing in Sweden's Gothia Cup and falling to a team from Taiwan in the championship final.

In 1978, Sting represented the United States in the first triennial global invitational tournament for national and club teams, the Women's World Invitation Tournament (the Chunghua Cup) in Taipei, Taiwan, tying for third place. When the tournament was held again in 1981, Sting again represented the U.S., playing in front of 45,000 fans and ultimately tying for ninth place.

Starting in 1979, Sting added teams in new age groups until they had established a team at every age group level from U11-U19.

=== 1980s ===
In 1980 at the first-ever United States Youth Soccer Association Women's U19 National Championship, decades after the first men's youth soccer National Amateur Cup. The Sting U19 team won the first-ever national championship, defeating St. Louis 5–0 in the championship match. It went on to win five of the first nine U.S. U19 national titles, including in 1982, 1985, 1987 and 1988, in addition to the 1980 win.

Upon finishing the 1981–82 season with 47 wins and 0 losses, Sting's collective nine-year record was 400 wins and just 9 losses.

In 1984, Sting was selected by the U.S. Soccer Federation to represent the U.S. in Xi'an, China at the first ever FIFA tournament for women's national teams. Sting faced off against established National Teams from countries all over the world, defeating Australia, Japan, and China to advance to the finals. Sting beat Italy in the Championship game becoming the first American team, male or female, to win a major international tournament.

Sting participated in the largest youth tournament in the world at the time during 1985, playing in the Norway Cup, featuring more than 1,500 male and female teams. The team earned 1st place and was chosen as the Team of the Tournament (out of both male and female teams) for their level of professionalism, discipline, and sportsmanlike conduct.

== Players ==
In 1991, four Sting players were invited to join the 16-player roster for the United States women's national soccer team to compete in the first-ever FIFA Women's World Cup. While two players elected not to go, Carla Overbeck and Tracey Leone represented the U.S. among the 1991 FIFA Women's World Cup squads.

== In popular culture ==
Dallas Sting's 1984 trip to China was due to be the subject of a film starring Matthew McConaughey, but it was scrapped in September 2022, six weeks before the scheduled start of filming, due to "disturbing allegations surrounding aspects of the true story". A subsequent report described the source of the allegations as an anonymous letter sent McConaughey's representative at talent agency WME, who then forwarded the letter to studio Skydance Media and producers Berlanti Productions. The letter described the allegations as accusations of inappropriate touching and behavior by Kinder toward the athletes he coached. Skydance launched an investigation in the accusations, which lasted two weeks, and McConaughey and director Kari Skogland reportedly left the project. Kinder denied the allegations in an interview with the Daily Mail. The cancellation cost Skydance several million dollars.

== See also ==
- USWNT All-Time Best XI
- Dare to Dream: The Story of the U.S. Women's Soccer Team – 2005 HBO documentary
- List of women's national football teams
- Women's association football around the world
- United States U-20 women's national soccer team
- United States U-23 women's national soccer team
- Women's United Soccer Association (WUSA), 2001–03
- Women's Professional Soccer (WPS), 2009–11
- National Women's Soccer League (NWSL), 2013–present
- Soccer in the United States
- United States men's national soccer team
