= San Diego Surf SC =

Soccer club in San Diego, California, U.S.

- Full name: San Diego Surf Soccer Club
- Founded: 1977
- Ground: Surf Sports Park; Del Mar, California, U.S.
- Website: https://surfsoccer.com https://sports.org.mx

San Diego Surf Soccer Club is an American youth soccer club based in San Diego County, California. It is a member of the Elite Clubs National League (ECNL).

== History ==
San Diego Surf Soccer Club was founded in 1977. According to itself, it is the oldest competitive youth soccer club in the San Diego area. As of November 2022, Surf has won 12 national championships, 29 regional championships, and over 74 state championships.

On August 10, 2021, San Diego Surf SC was named the first-ever Elite Clubs National League (ECNL) Boys Overall Club Champion. On November 15, 2022, it was announced that the club would join the Women's Premier Soccer League in the 2023 season. San Diego Surf SC was again named ECNL Boys Overall Club Champion in 2023. In 2012, Surf Nation was founded, building upon the foundation of San Diego Surf Soccer Club. Today, over 70 youth soccer clubs are a part of Surf Nation.

=== Lawsuit ===
In 2021, Girls Director of Coaching Rob Becerra was accused of sexual harassment during his employment with San Diego Surf SC, which led to a lawsuit against the club. Becerra was accused of harassing one of his employees, Karley Nelson, who joined the club in 2020. He allegedly told Nelson that she could "sleep with any of the guys in that clubhouse" and made repeated comments about her body. Additionally, the suit alleged that Becerra touched Nelson multiple times. Nelson was told that Becerra would be removed at the end of the season for poor performance, but to her knowledge, he was not reprimanded for the allegations of sexual harassment. Another woman who coached for the club alleged that Becerra had directed sexist and homophobic jokes at her.

== Notable people ==
=== Coaches ===
- (United States) Carlos Alvarez
- (United States) Rob Becerra
- (England) Billy Garton
- (Guam) Ryan Guy
- (Scotland) Scott Morrison
- (United States) Nelson Pizarro

=== Players ===
- (United States) Mathis Albert
- (United States) Corey Baird
- (United States) Melanie Barcenas
- (Spain) Miguel Berry
- (United States) Jordyn Bugg
- (United States) Servando Carrasco
- (United States) Grayson Dettoni
- (United States) Duran Ferree
- (United States) Mia Fishel
- (United States) Xavi Gnaulati
- (United States) Jacob Jackson
- (United States) Catarina Macario
- (United States) Simon Mršić
- (United States) Evan Rotundo
- (United States) Sebastian Soto
- (United States) Luca de la Torre

== See also ==
- Puerto Rico Surf SC
- SoCal Surf
