= Evan Rotundo =

American-French footballer

Personal information
- Date of birth: July 9, 2004 (age 22)
- Place of birth: La Mesa, California, United States
- Height: 1.74 m (5 ft 9 in)
- Position: Midfielder

Team information
- Current team: Dukla Prague

Youth career
- Albion San Diego
- San Diego Surf
- 2020–2022: Schalke 04
- 2022: Genk

Senior career*
| Years | Team | Apps | (Gls) |
| 2022–2024 | Jong Genk | 9 | (0) |
| 2024–2026 | F91 Dudelange | 53 | (12) |
| 2026– | Dukla Prague | 0 | (0) |

International career
| 2019 | United States U15 | 10 | (2) |
| 2020 | United States U17 | 3 | (1) |
- * Club domestic league appearances and goals as of June 13, 2026

Evan Rotundo (born July 9, 2004) is an American soccer player currently playing as a midfielder for Czech club Dukla Prague.

== Club career ==
Born in La Mesa, California, to an American father and French mother, Rotundo started his career with Albion San Diego and San Diego Surf. Trials with Manchester City, Arsenal and Caen followed, before he signed for German side Schalke 04 in 2020. In October 2021 he was named by English newspaper The Guardian as one of the best players born in 2004 worldwide.

In September 2022, he moved to Belgian side Genk, signing a three-year deal. He was assigned to the reserve squad Jong Genk which plays in the second-tier Challenger Pro League.

In Summer 2026, Rotundo signed with Czech club Dukla Prague as a free agent.

== International career ==
Rotundo has represented The United States at under-15 and under-17 level.

== Career statistics ==
=== Club ===
As of December 23, 2022.

| Club | Season | League | | | Cup | | Continental | | Other | | Total | |
| Club | Season | Division | Apps | Goals | Apps | Goals | Apps | Goals | Apps | Goals | Apps | Goals |
|---|---|---|---|---|---|---|---|---|---|---|---|---|
| Jong Genk | 2022–23 | Challenger Pro League | 4 | 0 | – | | – | | 0 | 0 | 4 | 0 |
| Career total | | | 4 | 0 | 0 | 0 | 0 | 0 | 0 | 0 | 4 | 0 |
