= Morne Jaloux Ridge =

- Village
- Location within Grenada
- Coordinates: 12°02′N 61°44′W
- Country: Grenada
- Parish: Saint George
- Elevation: 423 ft (129 m)
- Time zone: UTC-4

Morne Jaloux Ridge is a town in Saint George Parish, Grenada. It is located towards the southern end of the island, to the north of Morne Jaloux.
