= Chantimelle =

- Village
- Location within Grenada
- Coordinates: 12°12′N 61°39′W
- Country: Grenada
- Parish: Saint Patrick
- Elevation: 571 ft (174 m)
- Time zone: UTC-4

Chantimelle is a town in Saint Patrick Parish, Grenada. It is located at the northern end of the island.
