= 2021 Atlantic hurricane season =

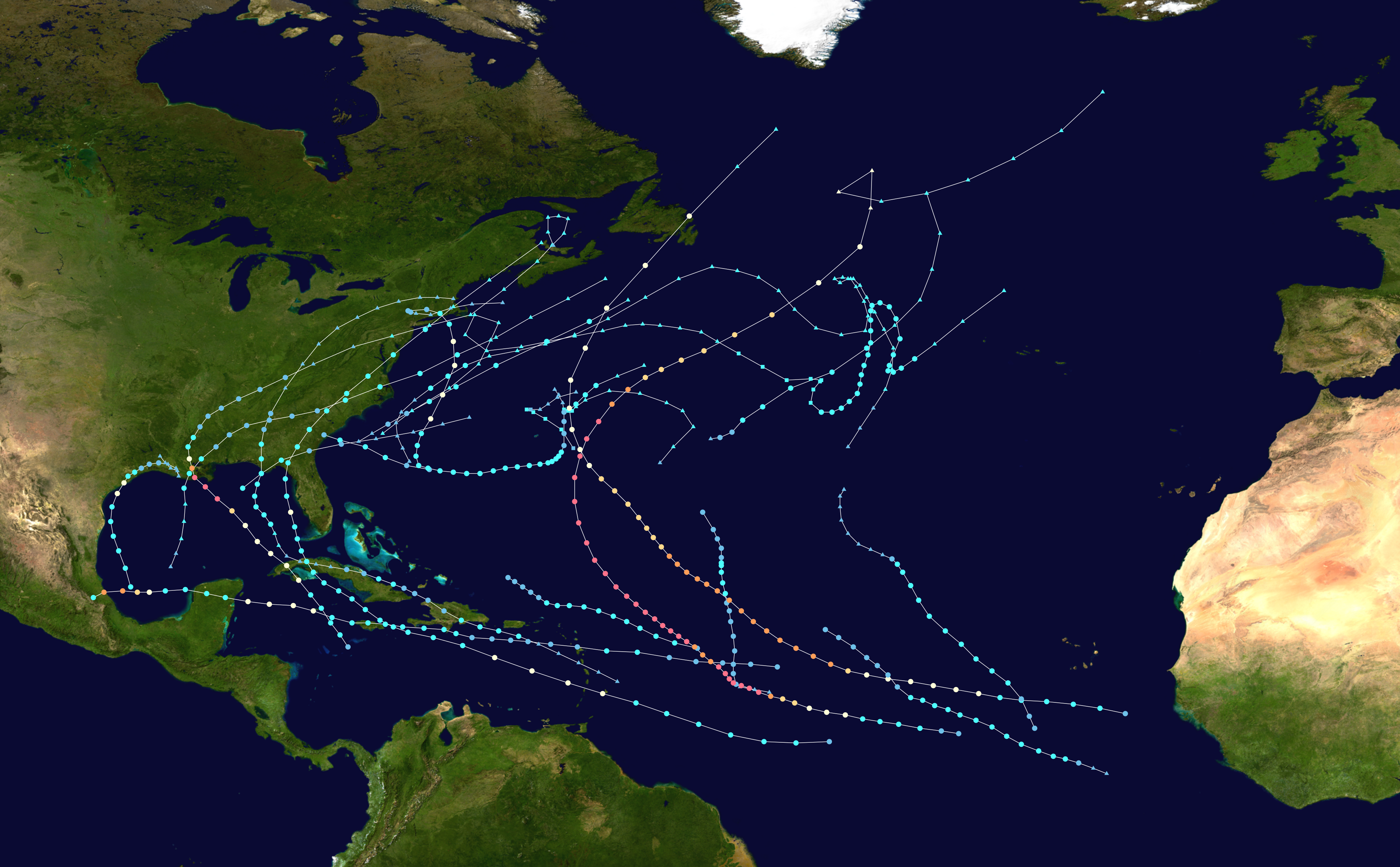
- Season summary map

Seasonal boundaries
- First system formed: May 22, 2021
- Last system dissipated: November 7, 2021

Strongest storm
- Name: Sam
  - Maximum winds: 155 mph (250 km/h) (1-minute sustained)
  - Lowest pressure: 927 mbar (hPa; 27.37 inHg)

Seasonal statistics
- Total depressions: 21
- Total storms: 21
- Hurricanes: 7
- Major hurricanes (Cat. 3+): 4
- ACE: 145.55
- Total fatalities: 198 total
- Total damage: $80.78 billion (2021 USD) (Fifth-costliest tropical cyclone season on record)

Related articles
- Timeline of the 2021 Atlantic hurricane season; 2021 Pacific hurricane season; 2021 Pacific typhoon season; 2021 North Indian Ocean cyclone season

The 2021 Atlantic hurricane season was the third-most active Atlantic hurricane season on record in terms of the number of tropical storms, although many of them were weak and short-lived. With 21 named storms forming, it became the second season in a row and third overall in which the designated 21-name list of storm names was exhausted. Seven of those storms strengthened into hurricanes, four of which reached major hurricane intensity, (Note: Hurricanes reaching Category 3 (111 miles per hour or 179 kilometers per hour) and higher on the five-level Saffir–Simpson wind speed scale are considered major hurricanes.) which is slightly above-average. The season officially began on June 1 and ended on November 30. These dates historically describe the period in each year when most Atlantic tropical cyclones form. However, subtropical or tropical cyclogenesis is possible at any time of the year, as demonstrated by the development of Tropical Storm Ana on May 22, making this the seventh consecutive year in which a storm developed outside of the official season. (Note: This seven-year streak of pre-season storms ended with the 2021 season, as there were no pre-season systems in 2022.)

Three named storms formed in June, tying the record for the most to develop in that month. Among them was Tropical Storm Claudette, which brought flooding to portions of the Deep South. Then, on July 1, Elsa developed and became the earliest-forming fifth named storm on record, surpassing Tropical Storm Edouard in 2020. The storm later caused significant impacts from Barbados to much of the East Coast of the United States, with about $1.2 billion in damage in the latter region. (Note: All monetary values are in 2021 United States dollars unless otherwise noted.) In August, Tropical Storm Fred flooded parts of the Caribbean and Southeastern United States, resulting in roughly $1.3 billion in damage. Hurricane Grace intensified to a Category 3 major hurricane before making landfall in the Mexican state of Veracruz, causing 17 deaths and about $513 million in damage in the Greater Antilles and Mexico. On August 22, Henri struck Rhode Island and brought flooding and high winds to the Northeastern United States, with damage estimated at $700 million.

Hurricane Ida became the deadliest and most destructive tropical cyclone of the season after striking southeastern Louisiana at Category 4 strength in late August, 16 years to the day after Hurricane Katrina decimated that same region. After devastating Louisiana and moving farther inland, Ida caused catastrophic flooding and spawned several destructive tornadoes across the Northeastern United States. Damage estimates from the storm exceeded $75 billion, contributing to over 93% of the total damage done in the season. Additionally, Ida killed 107 people, directly or indirectly, throughout the impacted regions. In September, Hurricane Larry peaked as a powerful Category 3 hurricane over the open Atlantic before making landfall in the Canadian province of Newfoundland and Labrador as a Category 1 hurricane. Later in the month, Hurricane Nicholas moved erratically both on- and offshore the coasts of Texas and Louisiana. Freshwater flooding, coastal flooding, and winds generated by Nicholas left about $1.1 billion in damage. Hurricane Sam became the most intense system of the season, peaking as a strong Category 4 hurricane in late September. Tropical cyclones during this season collectively caused 194 deaths and nearly $80.78 billion in damage, making it one of the costliest Atlantic hurricane seasons on record.

Nearly all forecasting agencies predicted above-average activity during the season, due to expectations of abnormally warm sea surface temperatures, the unlikelihood of an El Niño, and the possibility of a La Niña. Although these forecasted conditions transpired during the season, the agencies slightly underestimated the number of named storms, but nearly all were fairly accurate with the number of hurricanes and major hurricanes. This season, the National Hurricane Center (NHC) began issuing regular Tropical Weather Outlooks on May 15, two weeks earlier than it had done in the past. The change was implemented given that named systems had formed in the Atlantic Ocean prior to the start of the season in each of the preceding six cycles. Prior to the start of the season, NOAA deployed five modified hurricane-class saildrones at key locations around the basin, and in September, one of the vessels was in position to obtain video and data from inside Hurricane Sam. It was the first-ever research vessel to venture inside the middle of a major hurricane.

== Seasonal forecasts ==
Predictions of tropical activity in the 2021 season
Source	Date	Named storms	Hurricanes	Major hurricanes	Ref
Average (1991–2020)		14.4	7.2	3.2
Record high activity		30	15	7†
Record low activity		1	0†	0†
TSR	December 9, 2020	16	7	3
CSU	April 8, 2021	17	8	4
PSU	April 8, 2021	9–15	n/a	n/a
TSR	April 13, 2021	17	8	3
UA	April 13, 2021	18	8	4
NCSU	April 14, 2021	15–18	7–9	2–3
TWC	April 15, 2021	18	8	3
TWC	May 13, 2021	19	8	4
NOAA	May 20, 2021	13–20	6–10	3–5
UKMO*	May 20, 2021	14	7	3
TSR	May 27, 2021	18	9	4
CSU	June 3, 2021	18	8	4
UA	June 16, 2021	19	6	4
TSR	July 6, 2021	20	9	4
CSU	July 8, 2021	20	9	4
UKMO	August 2, 2021	15	6	3
NOAA	August 4, 2021	15–21	7–10	3–5
CSU	August 5, 2021	18	8	4
TSR	August 5, 2021	18	7	3
	Actual activity	21	7	4
* June–November only † Most recent of several such occurrences. (See all)

In advance of, and during, each hurricane season, several forecasts of hurricane activity are issued by national meteorological services, scientific agencies, and noted hurricane experts. These include forecasters from the United States National Oceanic and Atmospheric Administration (NOAA)'s Climate Prediction Center, Tropical Storm Risk (TSR), the United Kingdom's Met Office (UKMO), and Philip J. Klotzbach, William M. Gray and their associates at Colorado State University (CSU). The forecasts discuss weekly and monthly changes in significant factors that help determine the number of tropical storms, hurricanes, and major hurricanes within a particular year. According to NOAA and CSU, the average Atlantic hurricane season between 1991 and 2020 contained roughly 14 tropical storms, seven hurricanes, three major hurricanes, and an accumulated cyclone energy (ACE) index of 72–111 units. Broadly speaking, ACE is a measure of the power of a tropical or subtropical storm multiplied by the length of time it existed. It is only calculated for full advisories on specific tropical and subtropical systems reaching or exceeding wind speeds of 39 mph (63 km/h). NOAA typically categorizes a season as above-average, average, or below-average based on the cumulative ACE index, but the number of tropical storms, hurricanes, and major hurricanes within a hurricane season is sometimes also considered.

=== Pre-season forecasts ===
On December 9, 2020, TSR issued an extended range forecast for the 2021 hurricane season, predicting slightly above-average activity with 16 named storms, 7 hurricanes, 3 major hurricanes, and an ACE index of about 127 units. TSR cited the expected development of a weak La Niña during the third quarter of 2021 as the main factor behind their forecast. CSU released their first predictions on April 8, 2021, predicting an above-average season with 17 named storms, 8 hurricanes, 4 major hurricanes, and an ACE index of 150 units, citing the unlikelihood of an El Niño and much warmer than average sea surface temperatures in the subtropical Atlantic. On the same day, Pennsylvania State University predicted 9–15 named storms, anticipating slightly above-average sea surface temperatures and a neutral El Niño–Southern Oscillation. TSR updated their forecast on April 13, with 17 named storms, 8 hurricanes, and 3 major hurricanes, with an ACE index of 134 units. On the same day, the University of Arizona (UA) issued its seasonal prediction of above-average hurricane activities, with 18 named storms, 8 hurricanes, 4 major hurricanes, and an ACE index of 137 units. North Carolina State University (NCSU) made its prediction for the season on April 14, calling for an above-average season with 15 to 18 named storms, 7 to 9 hurricanes, and 2 to 3 major hurricanes. The Weather Company (TWC) issued their first predictions on April 15, forecasting 18 named storms, 8 hurricanes, and 3 major hurricanes, citing warm sea surface temperatures, a La Niña, and other active seasons with similar atmospheric conditions.

On May 13, TWC updated their forecast for the season, calling for an active season, with 19 named storms, 8 hurricanes, and 4 major hurricanes. On May 20, NOAA's Climate Prediction Center issued their forecasts for the season, predicting a 60% chance of above-average activity and 30% chance for below-average activity, with 13–20 named storms, 6–10 hurricanes, and 3–5 major hurricanes. The same day, UKMO issued their own forecast for the 2021 season, predicting an average one with 14 named storms, 7 hurricanes, and 3 major hurricanes, with a 70% chance that each of these statistics will fall between 9 and 19, 4 and 10, and 1 and 5, respectively. TSR's third seasonal forecast, issued on May 27, predicted 18 named storms, 9 hurricanes, and 4 major hurricanes.

=== Mid-season forecasts ===
The second prediction by CSU, issued on June 3, increased the number of named storms to 18, while leaving the number of hurricanes and major hurricanes unchanged at 8 and 4, respectively. On June 16, UA updated their forecast for the season, with 19 named storms, 6 hurricanes, 4 major hurricanes, and an ACE index of 183 units. On July 6, TSR released their third forecast for the season, slightly increasing their numbers to 20 named storms, 9 hurricanes, and 4 major hurricanes. This prediction was largely based on their expectation for a weak La Niña to develop by the third quarter of the year. On July 8, CSU updated their prediction to 20 named storms, 9 hurricanes, and 4 major hurricanes. UKMO's updated forecast on August 2 called for 15 named storms, 6 hurricanes, and 3 major hurricanes. The second and final forecast by NOAA, issued on August 4, predicted 15 to 21 named storms, 7 to 10 hurricanes, and 3 to 5 major hurricanes. On August 5, CSU's final seasonal predictions decreased the number of named storms to 18 and hurricanes to 8, while the number of major hurricanes remained unchanged. TSR issued their final forecast for the season on the same day, lowering their numbers to 18 named storms, 7 hurricanes, and 3 major hurricanes.

== Seasonal summary ==
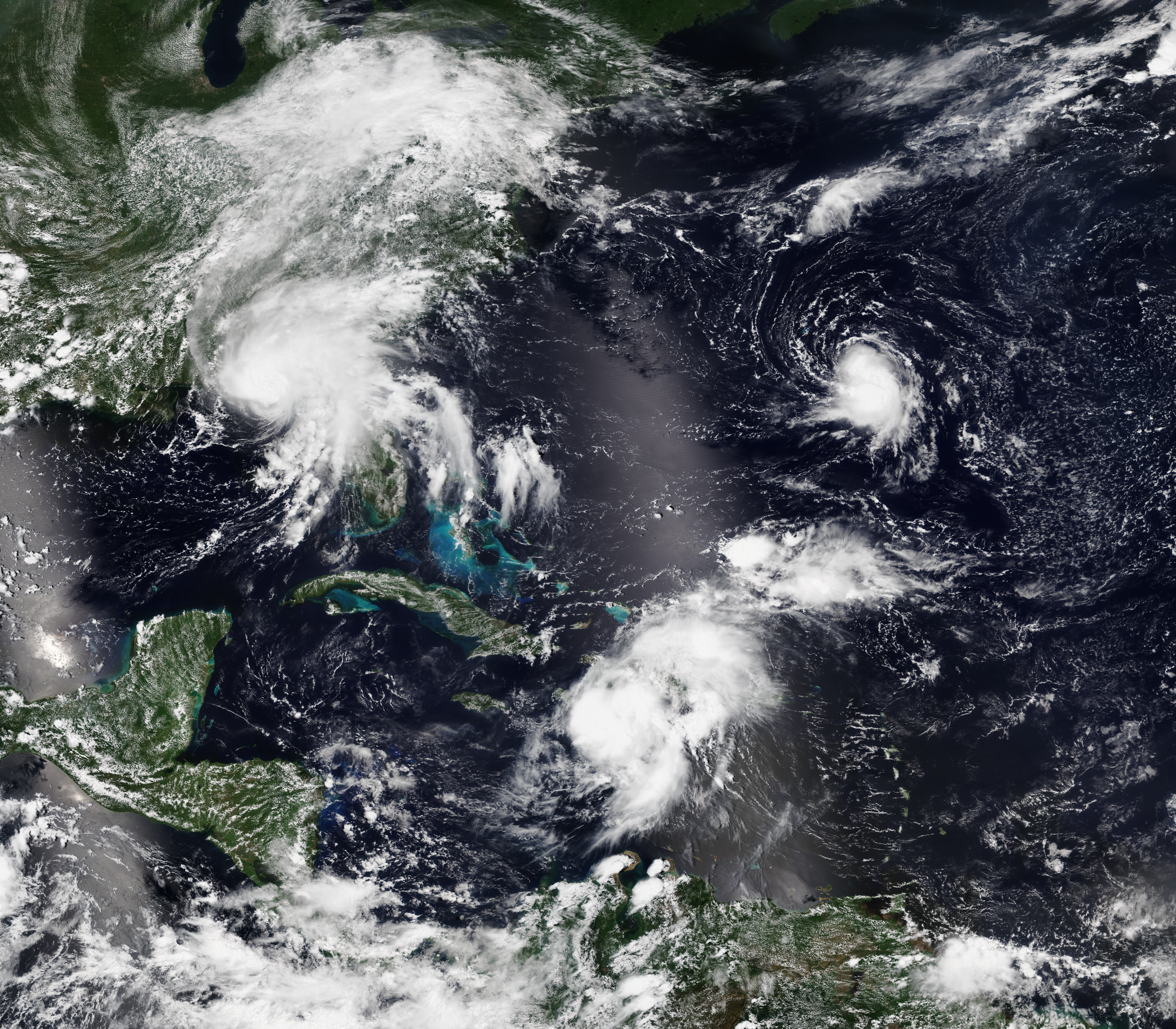
Three tropical cyclones simultaneously active in the North Atlantic on August 16: Fred (left), nearing landfall in the Florida Panhandle; Grace (bottom), south of Hispaniola; and the tropical depression which would eventually become Henri (upper right), near Bermuda

The 2021 Atlantic hurricane season officially ran from June 1 to November 30. A total of 21 tropical depressions formed, all of which reached at least tropical or subtropical intensity. This made it the third-most active Atlantic hurricane season on record, behind only 2005 and 2020. Like both those seasons, the 2021 season exhausted its primary list of storm names. (Note: Had additional tropical or subtropical storms formed in 2021, they would have been named from a supplemental list of names adopted by the World Meteorological Organization in March 2021.) Nine of the systems lasted for two days or less, tied with 2007 for the most since the NHC began monitoring subtropical systems in 1968. Although the season was highly active in terms of the number of named storms, seven of those tropical or subtropical systems intensified into a hurricane and four of those became a major hurricane, which is near-average and just slightly above-average, respectively. Nonetheless, 2021 marked the record sixth consecutive above-average season in the Atlantic. The ongoing warm Atlantic multidecadal oscillation, which began in 1995, contributed to the season's high level of activity, as it led to above-average sea surface temperatures in the Atlantic basin. Other factors included the presence of a La Niña and abnormally heavy West African Monsoon precipitation.

Collectively, the tropical and subtropical systems of the 2021 Atlantic hurricane season caused 194 deaths and about $80.727 billion in damage, making it the fourth costliest season on record. Eight named storms struck the United States, which is the third most ever, behind only the previous season and 1916. In conjunction with 2020, 19 systems of at least tropical storm intensity made landfall in the country during the two seasons, surpassing the record of 15 during the 2004 and 2005 seasons combined. As a result, some regions significantly impacted during the 2020 season were once again hit hard in 2021, especially eastern Louisiana and portions of the Northeastern United States. Rhode Island was struck by two tropical systems, Elsa and Henri, an unusual occurrence especially given that the state had recorded no landfalls since Bob in 1991. Four tropical cyclones or their remnants – Elsa, Fred, Ida, and Nicholas – each caused at least $1 billion in damage in the United States.

There were three named storms in June, tying 1886, 1909, 1936, 1959, 1966, 1968, 2023, and 2024 for most named storms in June. Elsa formed on June 30 and became a tropical storm on the following day, making it the earliest fifth-named storm on record, surpassing the previous record by five days, set by Tropical Storm Edouard in 2020. After Elsa dissipated, activity came to a monthlong halt due to unfavorable conditions across the basin. Tropical cyclogenesis also paused for much of the month of October, primarily due to the presence of drier air. For the first time since 2006 and only the second time during the hyperactive era which began in 1995, no named storms developed between October 6 and October 30.

The ACE index for the 2021 Atlantic hurricane season was approximately 145.6 units. The totals represent the sum of the squares for every (sub)tropical storm's intensity of over 39 mph (63 km/h), divided by 10,000. Therefore, the ACE index value does not include tropical depressions. Each season dating back to 2016 recorded ACE index values exceeding 129, which senior research associate Brian McNoldy of the University of Miami described as "unprecedented even for four years, let alone six!"

Throughout the season, NOAA Hurricane Hunters logged 462.2 flight hours, conducting 58 eyewall passages and deploying 1,310 dropsondes in the process. NOAA also deployed 66 underwater gliders, which made 78,328 observations on oceanic salinity and temperatures. Additionally, NOAA used five unmanned saildrones to increase documentation on atmospheric and oceanic conditions across the Atlantic basin. One of the five saildrones became the first research vessel to ever enter a major hurricane when it reached Hurricane Sam on September 30. It recorded sustained winds of 125 mph (201 km/h) and waves up to 50 ft (15 m) in height while also capturing video footage from inside the storm.

== Systems ==
=== Tropical Storm Ana ===
- Tropical storm (SSHWS)
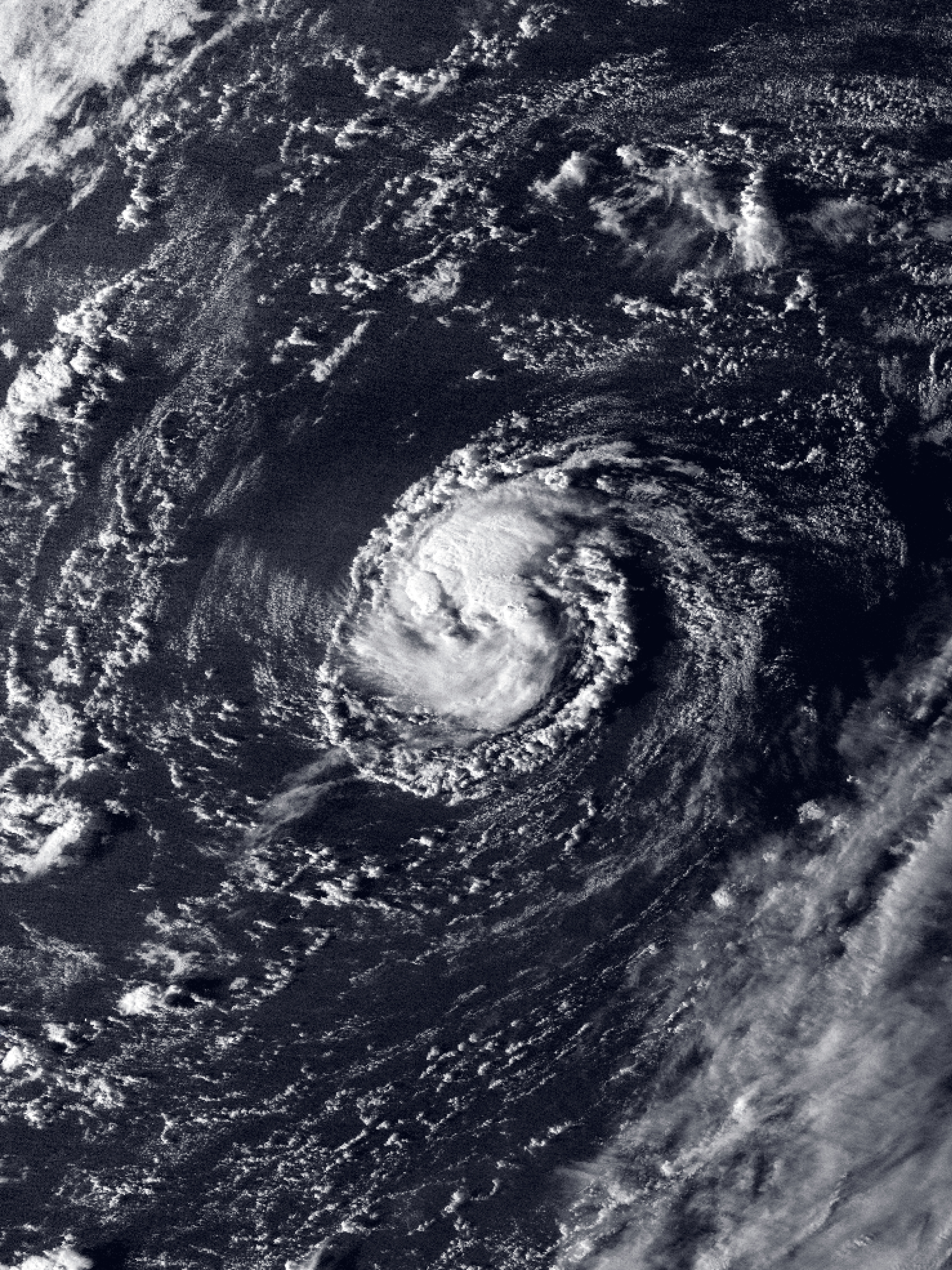
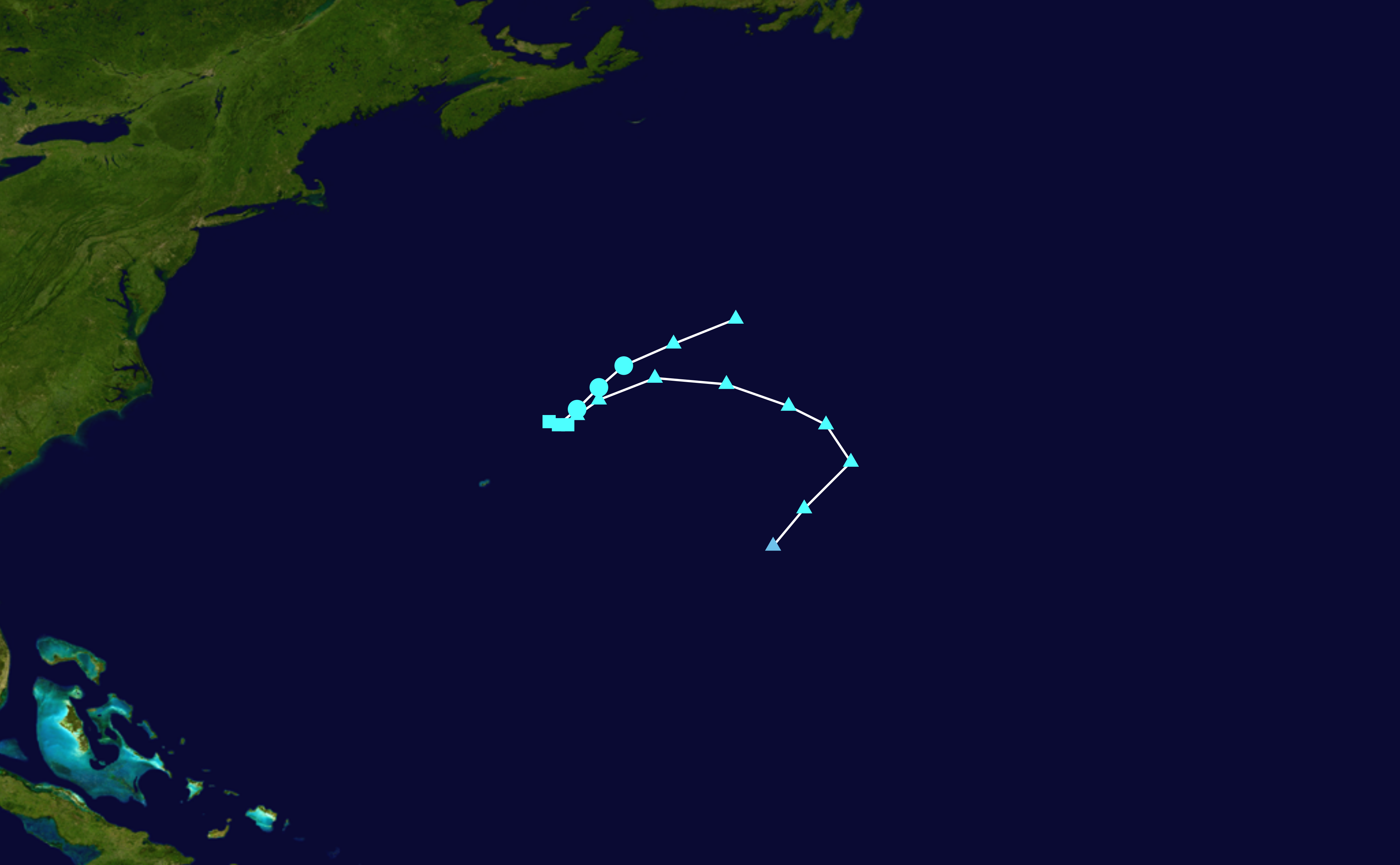
- Duration: May 22 – May 23
- Peak intensity: 45 mph (75 km/h) (1-min); 1004 mbar (hPa)

An upper-level trough drifted across the western Atlantic on May 19, inducing the formation of a low-pressure area along a stalled front the next day. This system became co-located with an upper-level low, reducing wind shear and causing atmospheric instability, which allowed convection to develop despite cold sea surface temperatures. After the disturbance shed its frontal characteristics, it became Subtropical Storm Ana at 06:00 UTC on May 22 about 200 mi (320 km) northeast of Bermuda. This made 2021 the seventh consecutive year in which a tropical or subtropical cyclone formed before the season's official start. It formed in a location where no tropical storms within the month of May had been documented since before 1950. Ana then made counter-clockwise loop due to weak steering currents. After the wind field became more symmetrical and convection organized further by early on May 23, Ana transitioned into a tropical storm as it accelerated northeastward amid southwesterly mid-level flow. Ana peaked with maximum sustained winds of 45 mph (72 km/h) before it encountered increasing wind shear and began losing convection. By 18:00 UTC on May 23, the system transitioned into an extratropical cyclone about 605 mi (975 km) northeast of Bermuda. The extratropical cyclone merged with a trough early on May 24 and was then absorbed by a frontal system later that day.

On May 20, the Bermuda Weather Service issued a tropical storm watch for the precursor to Ana, before canceling it two days later. The storm's precursor produced mostly light winds on Bermuda, although the Pearl Island station observed a sustained wind speed of 44 mph (71 km/h) and a gust of 49 mph (79 km/h).

=== Tropical Storm Bill ===
- Tropical storm (SSHWS)
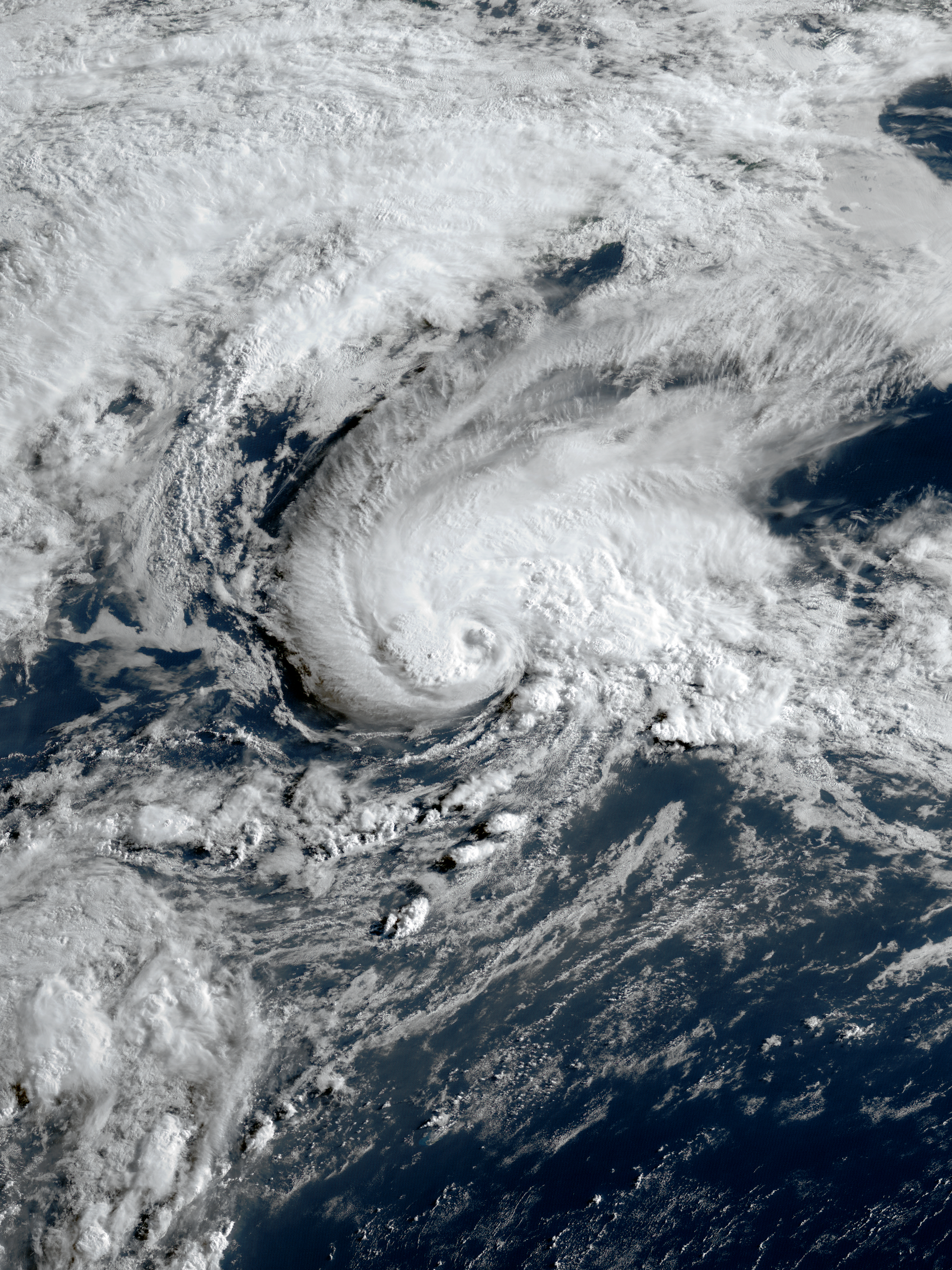
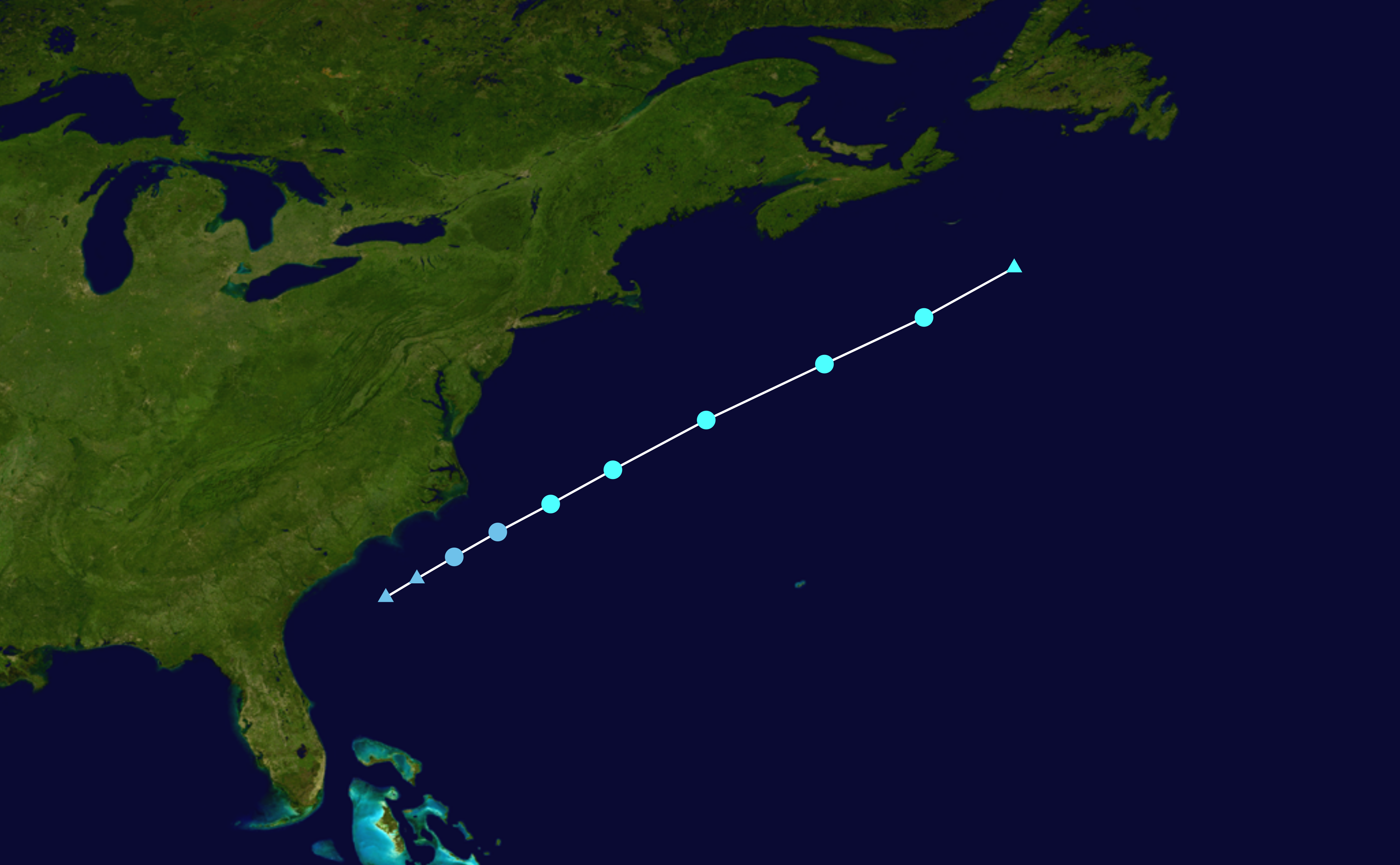
- Duration: June 14 – June 15
- Peak intensity: 65 mph (100 km/h) (1-min); 992 mbar (hPa)

In mid-June, a cold front sagged southward across the Mid-Atlantic United States. Shower and thunderstorm activity coalesced offshore South Carolina, leading to the formation of an area of low pressure there. This low, and the associated convection, became better defined while being directed northeast by a shortwave trough, and a tropical depression formed about 125 mi (200 km) east-southeast of Cape Fear, North Carolina, around 06:00 UTC on June 14. Though sheared, the incipient cyclone strengthened into Tropical Storm Bill twelve hours later. Banding features became better defined, especially across the northern and western quadrants of the storm, and Bill reached peak winds of 65 mph (105 km/h) early on June 15 while paralleling the Northeast United States coastline. Its northeast track soon brought the system over colder waters and into higher wind shear, resulting in Bill's transition to an extratropical cyclone approximately 370 mi (595 km) east-southeast of Halifax, Nova Scotia, around 00:00 UTC on June 16. The low dissipated into a trough six hours later before progressing across southeastern Newfoundland.

=== Tropical Storm Claudette ===
- Tropical storm (SSHWS)
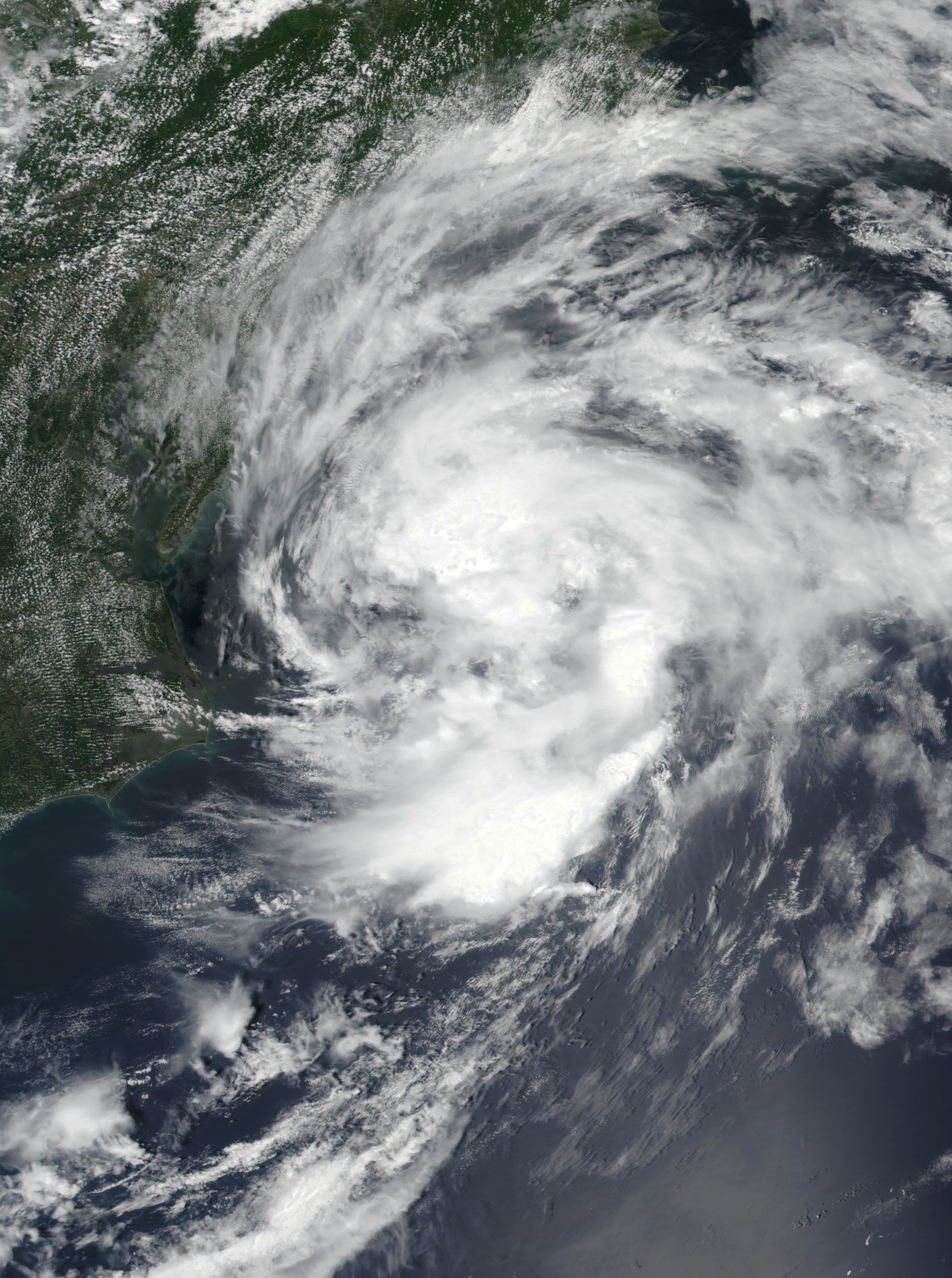
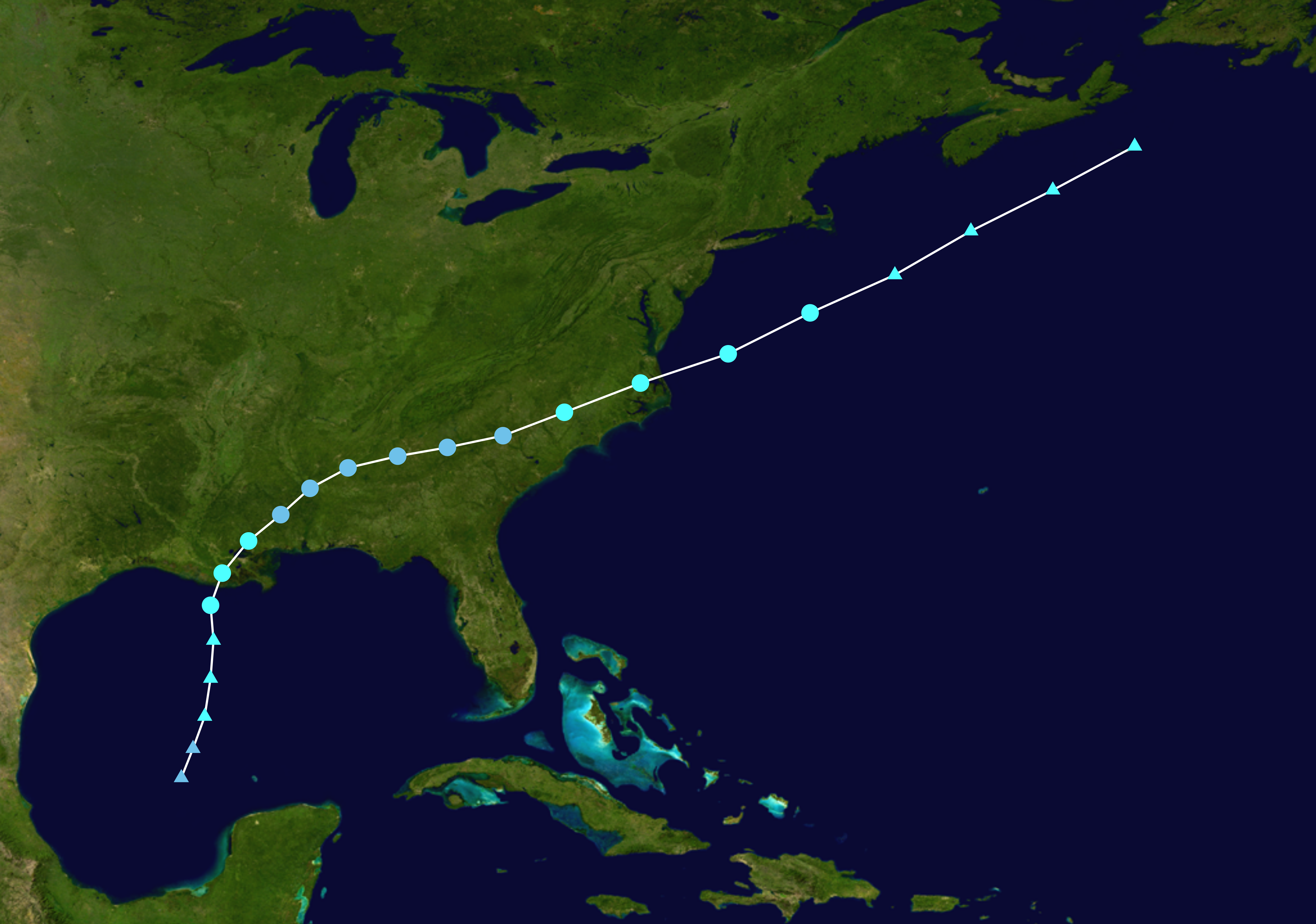
- Duration: June 19 – June 22
- Peak intensity: 45 mph (75 km/h) (1-min); 1003 mbar (hPa)

In mid-June, a Central American gyre produced distinct disturbances over the East Pacific and in the Bay of Campeche. The latter system moved north, though it struggled with wind shear, resulting in a broad center with multiple swirls and winds largely confined in a rainband to the east. Around 00:00 UTC on June 19, the system organized into Tropical Storm Claudette and promptly moved onshore about 30 mi (48 km) south-southwest of Houma, Louisiana, with peak winds of 45 mph (72 km/h). The cyclone weakened to a depression as it moved northeastward over Alabama, but it regained tropical storm intensity while crossing North Carolina and reached a secondary peak intensity just offshore. On June 22, Claudette became an extratropical cyclone, which dissipated the next day to the southeast of Nova Scotia.

The precursor Central American gyre, which also contributed to the development of Tropical Storm Dolores in the eastern Pacific, brought flooding to portions of Mexico, especially in Oaxaca, Puebla, and Veracruz. At least 400 homes in Veracruz alone suffered damage due to flooding or mudslides, while two people drowned in Chiapas. Between far eastern Louisiana and the Florida Panhandle, Claudette produced tropical storm-force wind gusts, heavy rainfall, and storm surge ranging from 2 to 4 ft (0.61 to 1.22 m) in height. Precipitation in Louisiana peaked at 11.03 in (280 mm) near Slidell, causing some degree of damage to 100 homes in the city. Additionally, about 100 homes in Hancock County, Mississippi, suffered water damage due to a combination of heavy rainfall and storm surge. Claudette also spawned at least nine tornadoes, four in Mississippi, three in Alabama, and one each in Georgia and North Carolina. One of the Alabama tornadoes, which was rated high-end EF2, remained on the ground for just over 22 mi (35 km), causing major damage and injured 20 people between East Brewton and Castleberry. The system caused 14 fatalities in the United States, all in Alabama, with 10 of those deaths due to a multi-vehicular accident near Montgomery. Overall, damage from Claudette in the United States was estimated at $375 million.

=== Tropical Storm Danny ===
- Tropical storm (SSHWS)
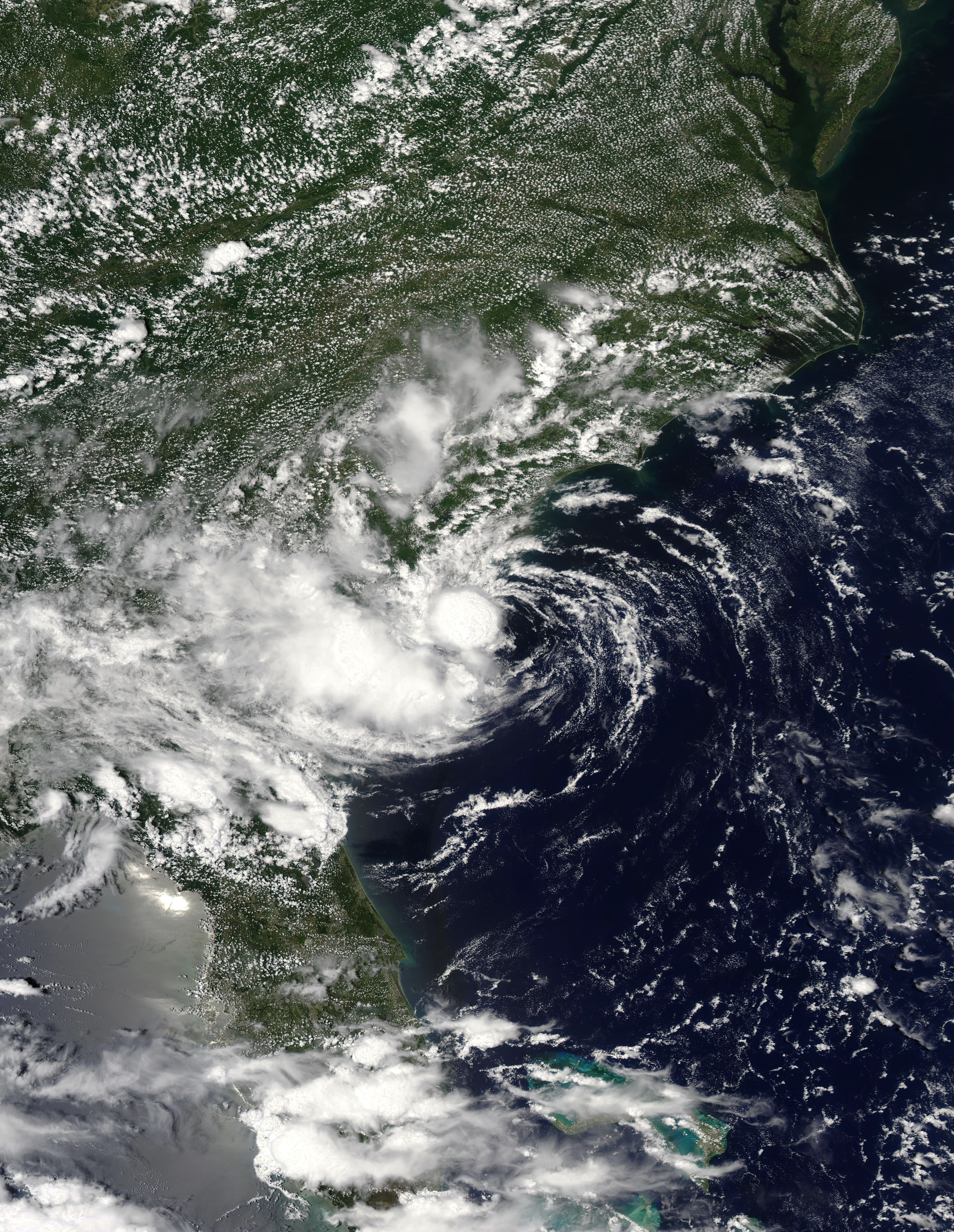
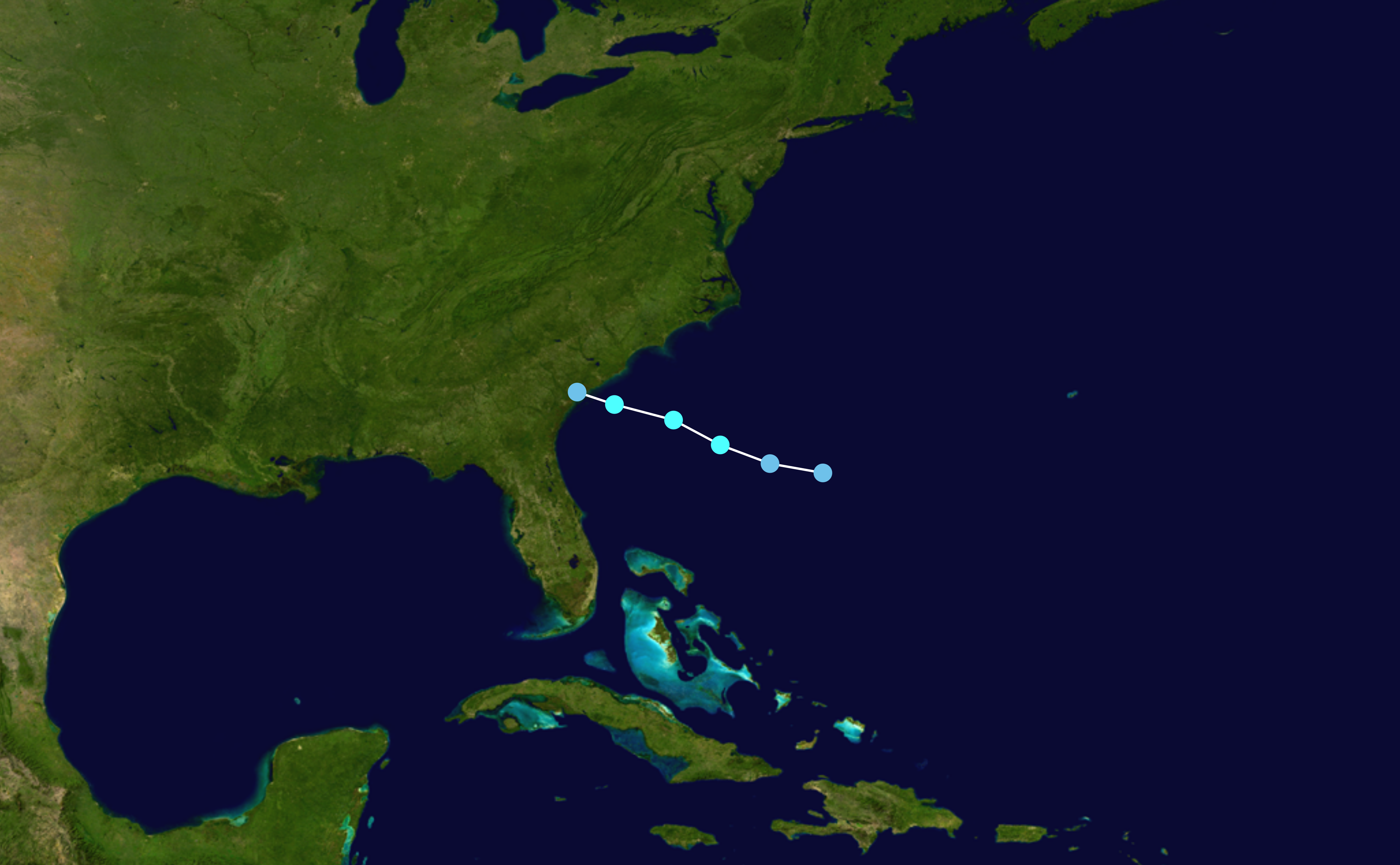
- Duration: June 27 – June 29
- Peak intensity: 45 mph (75 km/h) (1-min); 1009 mbar (hPa)

On June 22, an upper-level trough detached from the mid-latitude jet stream. The system transitioned into an upper-level low over the subtropical central Atlantic during the next few days while trekking southwestward. Warmer waters caused convective activity to increase on June 24 while a deep-layer ridge moved the system westward. By June 27, the trough developed a closed low-level circulation as it continued to track west-northwestward, and it is estimated that Tropical Depression Four formed by 18:00 UTC that day about 460 mi (740 km) east-southeast of Charleston, South Carolina. Approximately 12 hours later, the depression strengthened into Tropical Storm Danny. The storm intensified slightly further a few hours later and peaked with maximum sustained winds of 45 mph (75 km/h) and a minimum pressure of 1009 mb (29.80 inHg). At 23:20 UTC on June 28, Danny made landfall just north of Hilton Head on Pritchards Island, South Carolina, with sustained winds of 40 mph (65 km/h). The cyclone rapidly weakened while moving inland, falling to tropical depression intensity just 40 minutes later. Danny dissipated over eastern Georgia early on June 29, after satellite imagery revealed that its low-level circulation was no longer well defined.

Danny became the first storm to make landfall in South Carolina in the month of June since 1867. The storm produced rainfall totals of up to 3 in (76 mm) in parts of South Carolina in a matter of hours following its landfall, causing minor flash floods in populated areas. Approximately 1,200 power outages occurred in southeastern South Carolina. Lightning damaged some structures, while windy conditions caused sporadic tree damage. Rip currents generated by the storm resulted in 10 water rescues in North Carolina. Farther inland, Danny produced heavy rainfall across portions of Metro Atlanta as it tracked across Georgia in a westward direction. Overall, the storm caused only about $5,000 in damage.

=== Hurricane Elsa ===
- Category 1 hurricane (SSHWS)
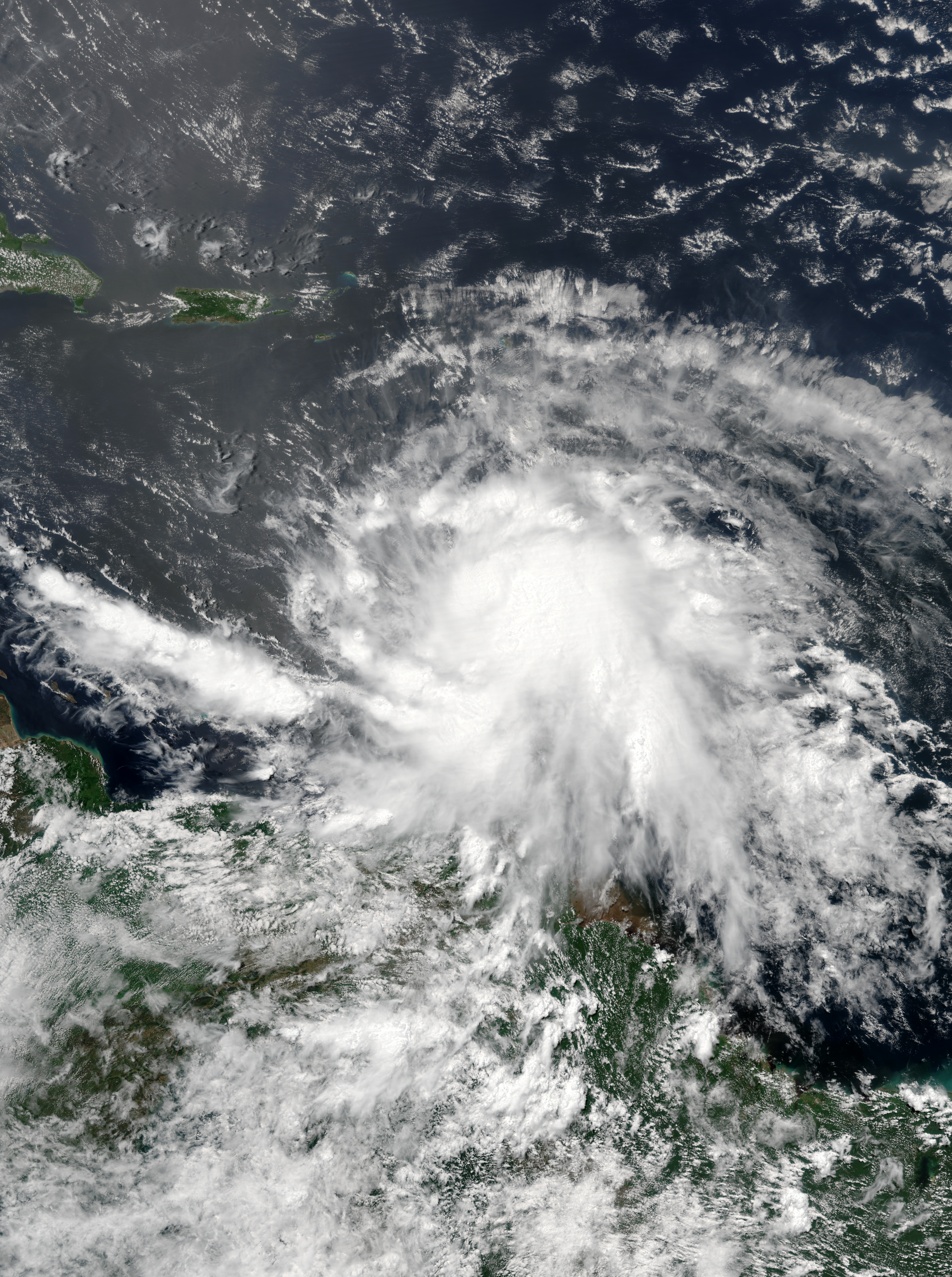
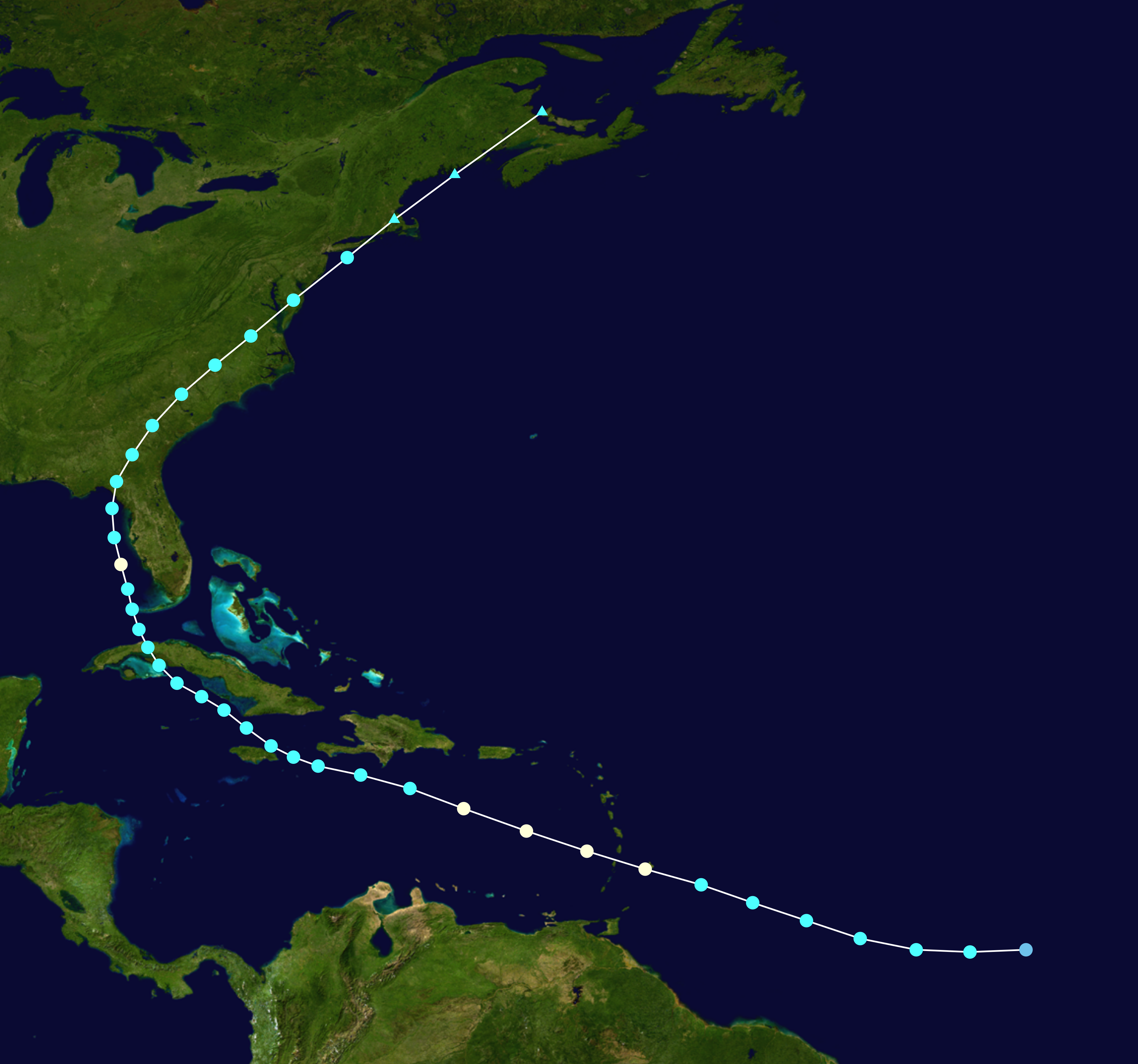
- Duration: June 30 – July 9
- Peak intensity: 85 mph (140 km/h) (1-min); 991 mbar (hPa)

On June 30, a tropical depression formed about 1,150 mi (1,850 km) east-southeast of Barbados, which quickly Tropical Storm Elsa. The storm continued westward due to a strong subtropical ridge to the north. Elsa intensified into a hurricane on July 2, and passed near Saint Lucia and Saint Vincent shortly thereafter. The cyclone then reached the Caribbean and attained its peak intensity as a Category 1 hurricane with winds of 85 mph (137 km/h) and a minimum pressure of 991 mbar (29.3 inHg). Elsa weakened back to a tropical storm on July 3 due to its rapid forward motion, passing just north of Jamaica. At 18:30 UTC on July 5, Elsa made landfall in Ciénaga de Zapata in Matanzas Province, Cuba, with winds of 65 mph (105 km/h). The storm curved north-northwestward and emerged into the Gulf of Mexico early the following day. Favorable conditions allowed Elsa to briefly re-attain hurricane status early on July 7, before wind shear and dry air entrainment weakened the system back to a tropical storm six hours later. At 14:30 UTC, the cyclone struck Taylor County, Florida, with winds of 65 mph (105 km/h). The storm weakened after landfall, but did not fall below minimal tropical storm strength. Instead, Elsa re-intensified due to baroclinic forcing while accelerating northeastward. Elsa became an extratropical cyclone at 18:00 UTC on July 9 over eastern Massachusetts, before the remnants dissipated over Atlantic Canada on the following day.

While passing through the Windward Islands, Elsa produced sustained hurricane-force winds on Barbados, the first storm to do so since Janet in 1955. Winds downed many trees and left the entire island without electricity. The storm also damaged approximately 1,300 homes, with 62 of them completely destroyed. Additionally, Saint Vincent and the Grenadines reported damage to 43 homes and 3 police stations, while the island nation suffered significant banana crop losses. Strong winds on Saint Lucia downed a number of trees and power lines, leaving approximately 90% of electrical customers without power. Although Martinique experienced mostly minor damage, one death occurred there. In the Dominican Republic, two fatalities occurred after strong winds caused the walls of a structure to collapse. Heavy rainfall in portions of Cuba led to flooding that inundated many streets in Cienfuegos Province and isolated three towns. Elsa capsized a boat containing 22 people in the Straits of Florida, 9 of whom were never found and presumed to have drowned. In Florida, the cyclone flooded streets and downed a number of trees, especially in Key West and along the state's west coast. One death occurred in Florida. Farther inland, Elsa and its remnants produced 17 weak tornadoes between North Florida and South New Jersey. A few of them caused significant damage, including an EF1 tornado in St. Marys, Georgia, which also injured 17 people. Portions of the Northeastern United States reported wind damage and flooding, especially the New York metropolitan area. Damage in the United States totaled approximately $1.2 billion. Winds and rains generated by Elsa in Atlantic Canada left about 50,000 households without electricity, many of them in New Brunswick.

=== Tropical Storm Fred ===
- Tropical storm (SSHWS)
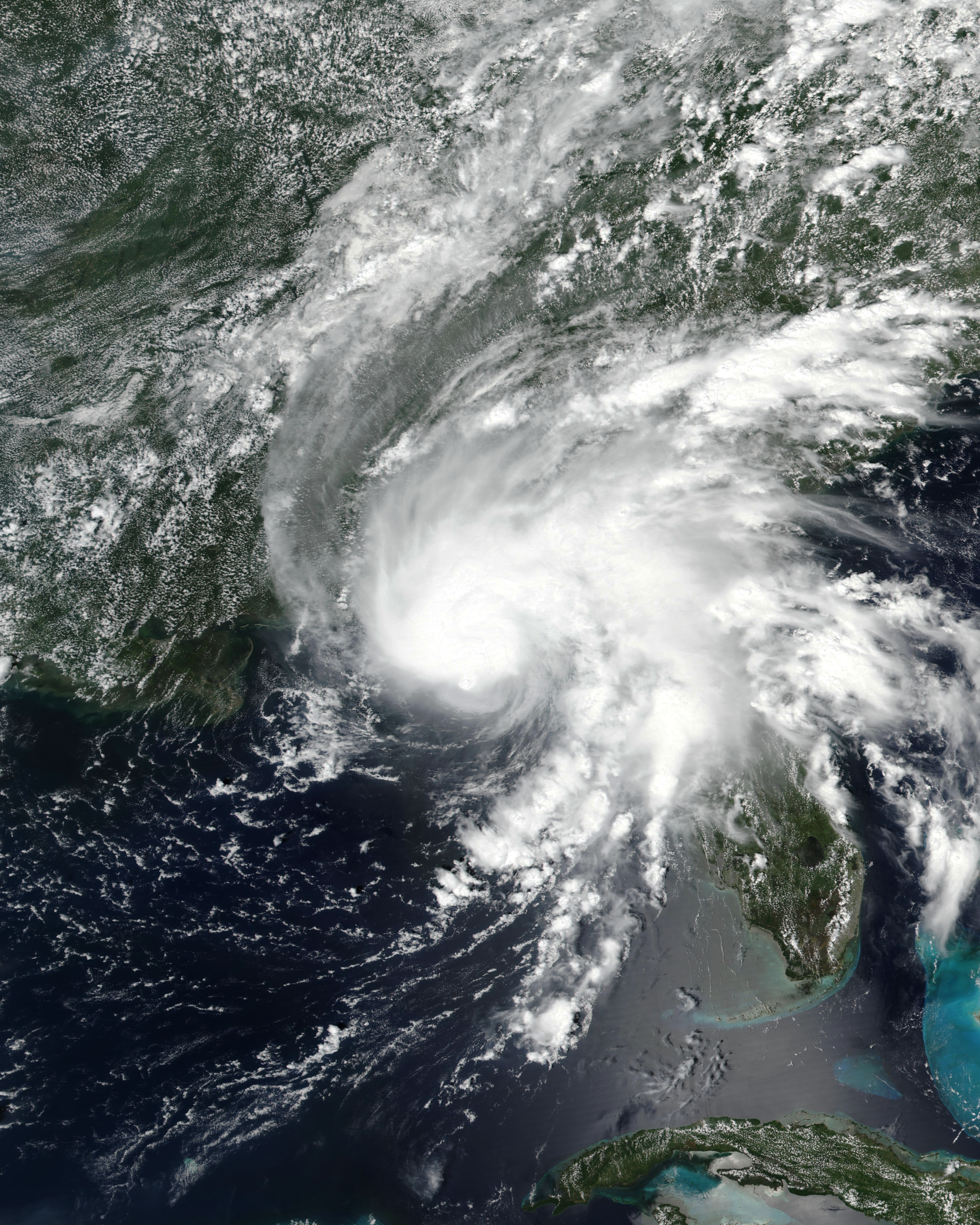
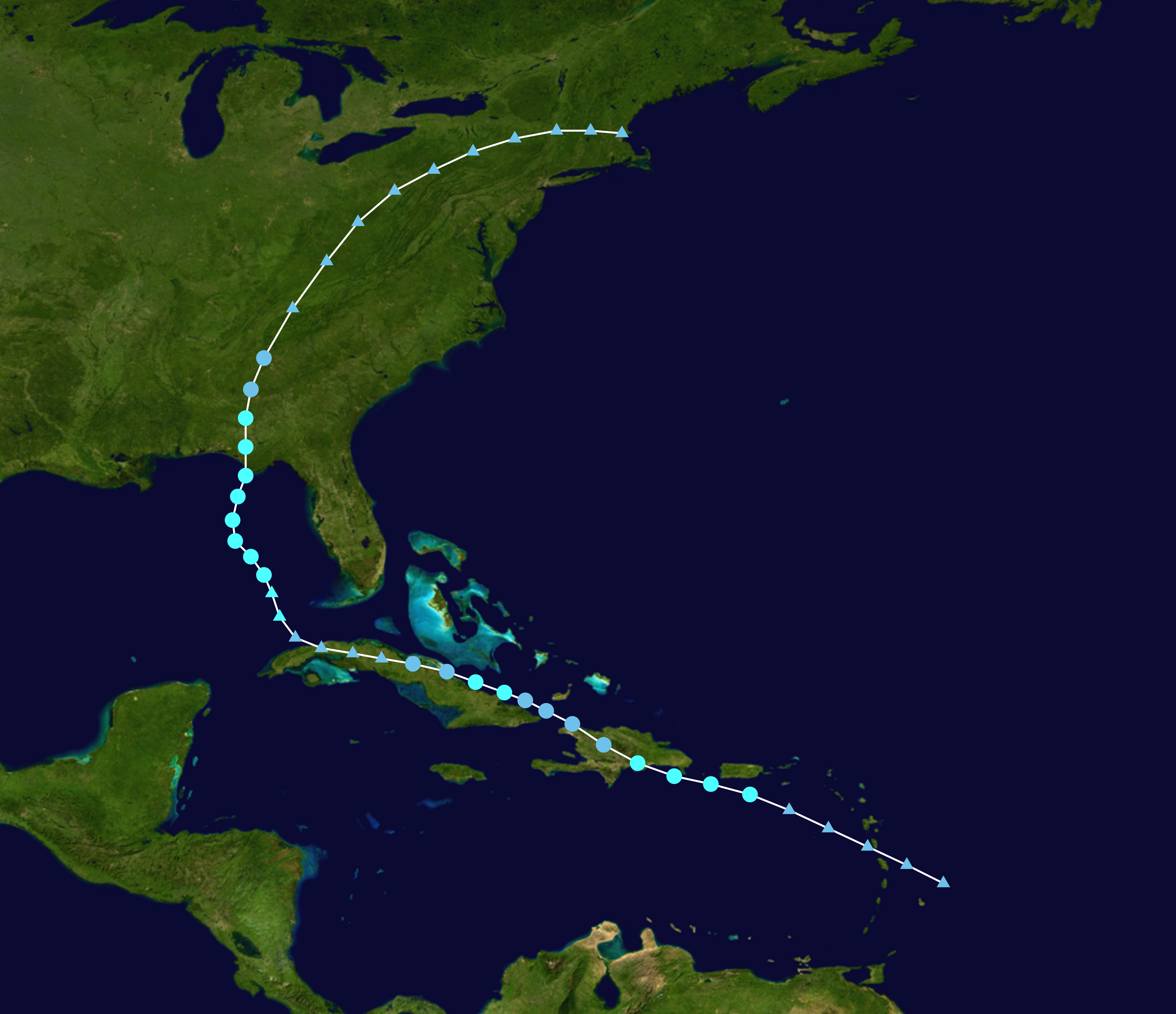
- Duration: August 11 – August 17
- Peak intensity: 65 mph (100 km/h) (1-min); 991 mbar (hPa)

Three tropical waves emerged into the Atlantic from the west coast of Africa in late July and early August. The waves slowly consolidated and organized while moving generally west-northwestward across the Atlantic. The system passed through the Leeward Islands without a well-defined center on August 10. On the next day, the system developed into Tropical Storm Fred over the northeastern Caribbean just south of Puerto Rico. Fred then made landfall near San Cristóbal, Dominican Republic, with winds of 45 mph (72 km/h) at 17:00 UTC. The storm deteriorated to a tropical depression early on August 12, hours before emerging into the Atlantic off the north coast of Haiti. Fred briefly re-intensified into a tropical storm on August 13, but strong wind shear weakened it back to a tropical depression before striking Cayo Romano, Cuba, at 12:00 UTC. Land interaction then caused the system to degrade into an open trough early on August 14, but the storm began re-organizing after emerging into the Gulf of Mexico several hours later. Fred re-developed into a tropical storm over the eastern Gulf of Mexico around 12:00 UTC the next day as it headed generally northward. At 18:00 UTC on August 16, Fred peaked with winds of 65 mph (105 km/h) and a minimum pressure of 993 mbar (29.3 inHg), just over an hour before making landfall near Cape San Blas, Florida. Fred weakened to a tropical depression over Alabama on August 17, before weakening into a remnant low over Tennessee at 00:00 UTC on August 18. The remnant low became extratropical over Pennsylvania, which later dissipated over Massachusetts on August 20.

Several islands of the Lesser Antilles reported rainfall and gusty winds. Similar conditions in Puerto Rico resulted in over 13,000 customers losing electricity. In the Dominican Republic, Fred left approximately 500,000 people without electricity and 40,000 customers without power. Floods isolated 47 communities and damaged or demolished more than 800 homes, including about 100 in Santo Domingo. The storm produced heavy rains over parts of Cuba, including a maximum total of 11.25 in (286 mm) of precipitation at Hatibonico in Guantánamo Province. In Florida, storm surge caused minor coastal flooding in the Forgotten Coast region. About 40,000 customers lost electricity throughout northern Florida. One person died from a car accident due to hydroplaning in Bay County. Fred and its remnants later spawned 31 tornadoes from Georgia to Massachusetts. The storm also caused flooding as it moved farther inland, especially over western North Carolina. At least 784 businesses and homes and 23 bridges in Buncombe and Haywood counties combined were damaged or destroyed. The town of Cruso alone reported six fatalities and about $300 million in damage. Throughout the United States, Fred left seven deaths and approximately $1.3 billion in damage.

=== Hurricane Grace ===
- Category 3 hurricane (SSHWS)
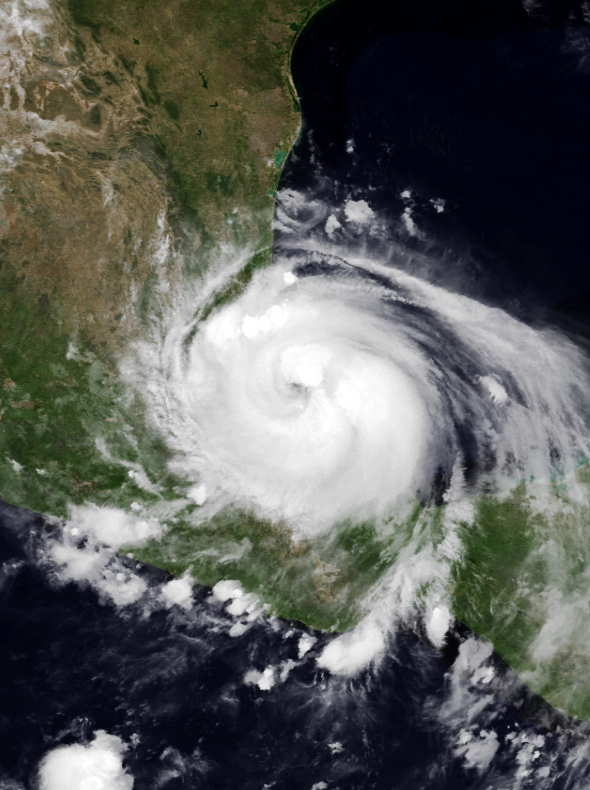
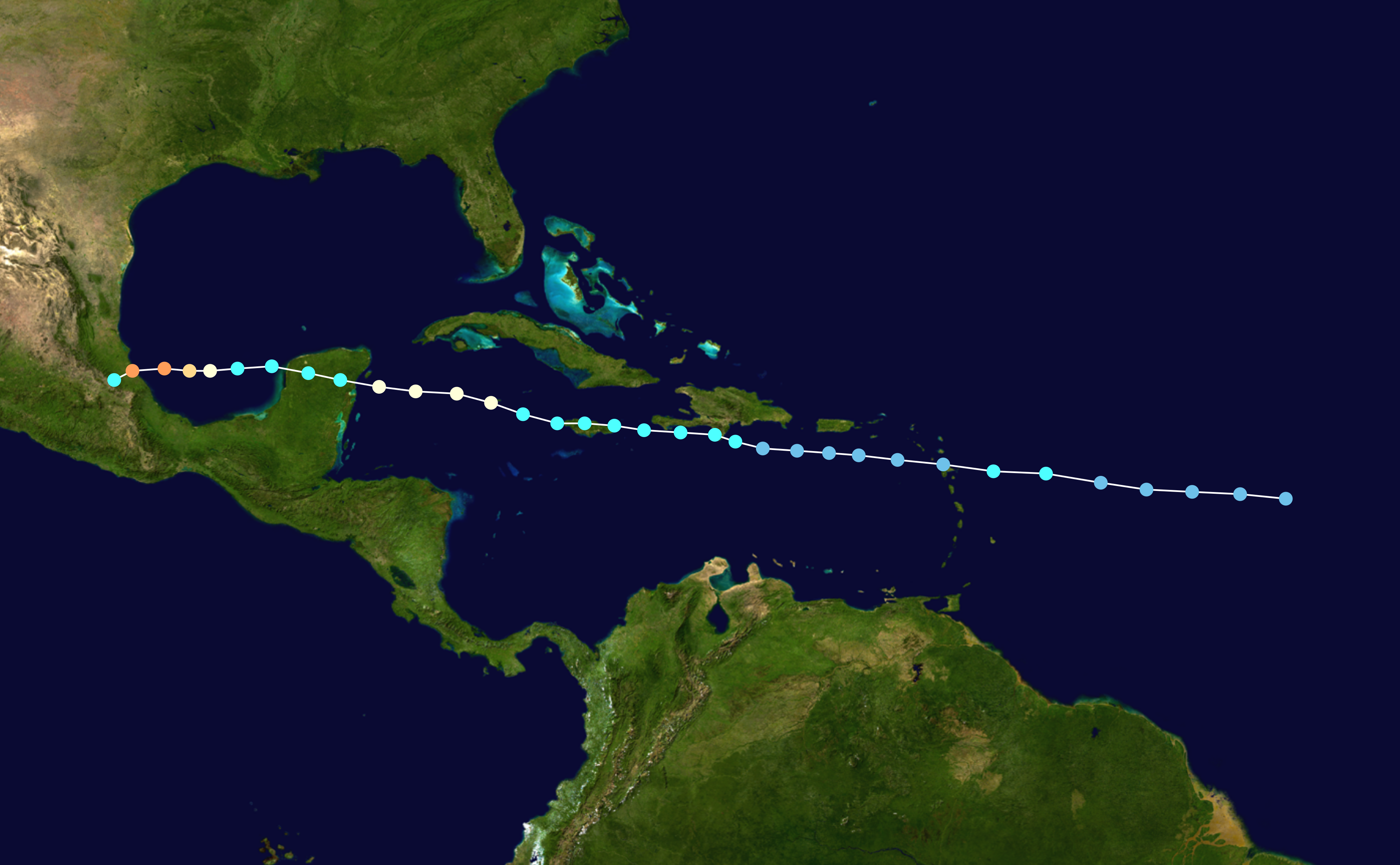
- Duration: August 13 – August 21
- Peak intensity: 120 mph (195 km/h) (1-min); 967 mbar (hPa)

On August 9, a tropical wave entered the Atlantic from the west coast of Africa. Tracking quickly westward, the system became a tropical depression on August 13, approximately 1,015 mi (1,635 km) east of the Leeward Islands. It strengthened into Tropical Storm Grace on August 14, although dry air and the storm's quick motion caused Grace to weaken back to a tropical depression early the next day. Grace soon entered the Caribbean, and it reintensified into a tropical storm on August 16. Around 16:30 UTC, the system made landfall near Oviedo, Dominican Republic, and subsequently brushed Haiti's Tiburon Peninsula. Around 14:00 UTC on August 17, the cyclone struck Jamaica with winds of 60 mph (97 km/h). Grace soon re-emerged into the Caribbean and intensified into a hurricane on the following day. At 09:45 UTC on August 19, the storm made landfall near Tulum, Quintana Roo, with winds of 85 mph (137 km/h). Grace weakened to a tropical storm before emerging into the Bay of Campeche. The cyclone quickly strengthened, re-attaining hurricane status at 12:00 UTC on August 20 and becoming a major hurricane about 12 hours thereafter. Around 00:00 UTC on August 21, Grace peaked as a Category 3 hurricane with maximum sustained winds of 120 mph (195 km/h) and a minimum central pressure of 967 mbar (28.6 inHg). The system made landfall near Tecolutla, Veracruz, at 05:30 UTC. It rapidly weakened over the mountains of central Mexico and dissipated by 18:00 UTC. However, the remnants of Grace traveled across Mexico, and contributed to the development of Tropical Storm Marty in the Eastern Pacific.

Because Grace weakened to a tropical depression before reaching the Leeward Islands, only light winds and rainfall occurred there. In the Dominican Republic, flooding damaged about 500 homes and displaced over 2,400 people. Grace also brought flooding to Haiti – especially the Sud-Est department – just days after the country experienced a devastating earthquake, which killed more than 2,200 people. Grace caused at least four fatalities in Haiti, although the death toll may have been higher given the short time that elapsed between the storm and the earthquake. Jamaica observed sustained tropical storm-force winds, causing about 100,000 electrical customers to lose power and damaging some structures. Additionally, up to 14.07 in (357 mm) of rain fell at Bois Content, inundating more than 1,500 acres (600 ha) of banana and plantain crops and collapsing a bridge. In the Cayman Islands, tropical storm-force sustained winds and hurricane-force gusts damaged several buildings and residences and left more than 27,000 electrical customers without power on Grand Cayman alone. Grace's passage across the Yucatán Peninsula caused nearly 700,000 customers to lose electricity. High winds also downed many trees and power lines while causing minor damage to 20 schools and some other structures. The storm's second landfall in Mexico left significant impact in Hidalgo, Puebla, and Veracruz, with 110,000 homes damaged in the three states combined due to flooding, mudslides, and strong winds. Puebla and Veracruz also sustained extensive crop losses, with the latter reporting damage to about 490,000 acres (200,000 ha) of bananas, beans, citrus, and corn. Additionally, the hurricane damaged approximately 3,000 schools in Veracruz. Thirteen fatalities occurred in Mexico. Overall, Grace was responsible for 17 deaths and $513 million in damage.

=== Hurricane Henri ===
- Category 1 hurricane (SSHWS)
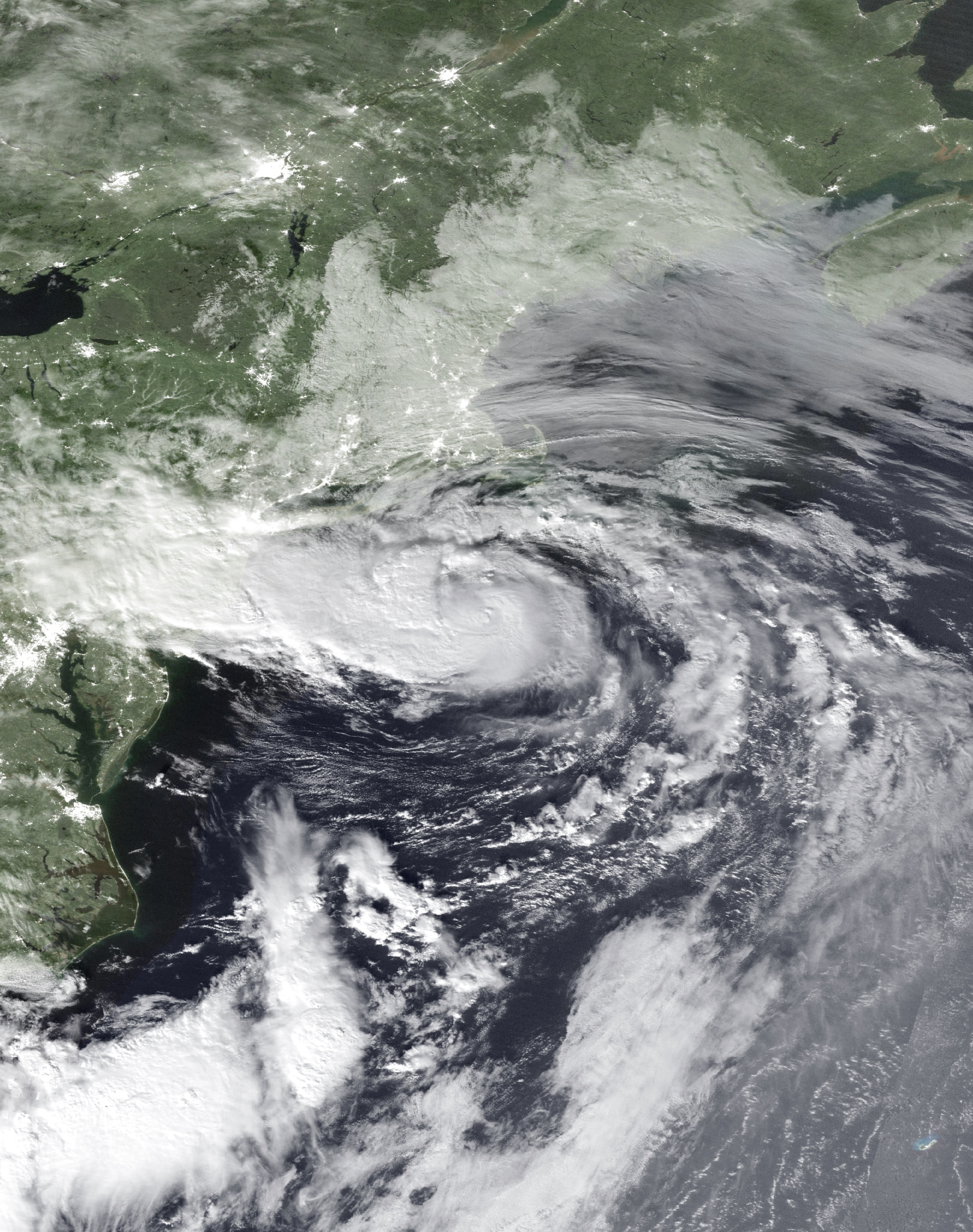
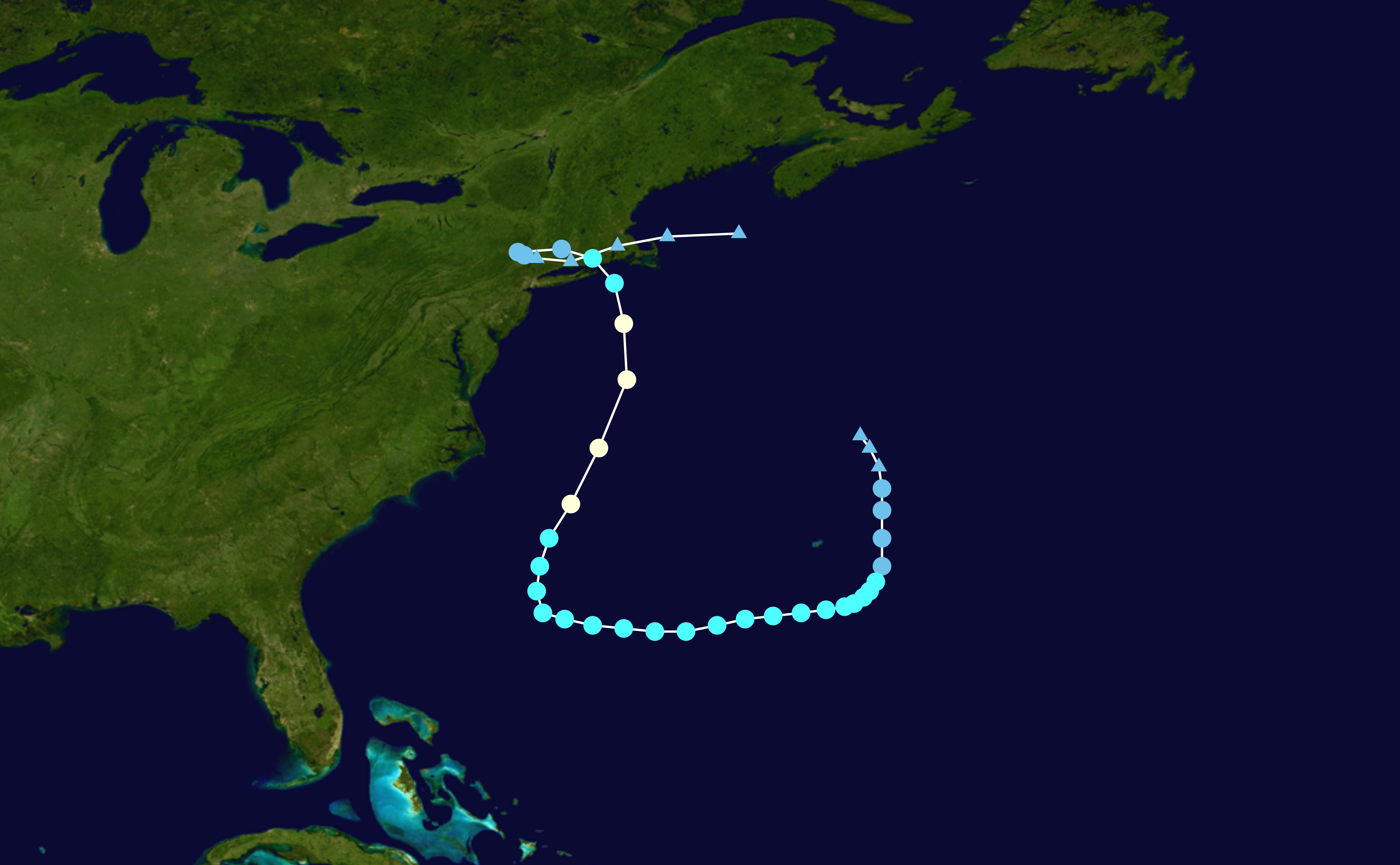
- Duration: August 15 – August 23
- Peak intensity: 75 mph (120 km/h) (1-min); 986 mbar (hPa)

Between August 11 and August 12, a mid-level disturbance and its associated convection moved offshore the Mid-Atlantic. The system spawned a weak surface trough on August 14, which became a surface low-pressure area early the following day. After deep convection organized further, a tropical depression formed at 18:00 UTC on August 15 about 230 mi (370 km) north-northeast of Bermuda. Tracking southward due to a nearby mid-level high-pressure area, the depression intensified into Tropical Storm Henri about 24 hours later. Due to persistent wind shear, the center was consistently near the western edge of its convection. Late on August 18, however, Henri intensified into a high-end tropical storm as the convection organized and wrapped around the mid-level circulation center. For the next three days, Henri remained as a strong tropical storm whilst curving northwards as it rounded the western edge of the Azores High. At 12:00 UTC on August 21, Henri strengthened to a hurricane as wind shear relaxed, allowing the low-level and the mid-level circulation centers to align. Henri weakened to a tropical storm on August 22, shortly before making two landfalls in Rhode Island, first on Block Island and later near Westerly with winds of 65 mph (105 km/h). After landfall, Henri rapidly weakened to a tropical depression as it made a small loop. Late on August 23, Henri degenerated into a remnant low over southeastern New York. The remnant low moved eastward and dissipated in the Atlantic east of New England on the next day.

In the Northeastern United States, the system produced tides that left water up to 2 to 4 ft (0.61 to 1.22 m) above-ground in coastal Connecticut and the north side of Long Island in New York. Several locations in the region reported tropical-storm force winds, with a gust up to 70 mph (110 km/h) in Point Judith, Rhode Island. Consequently, wind damage was mainly limited to uprooted trees. Parts of the Northeastern United States, especially Connecticut, New Jersey, and New York, reported heavy rainfall, including a peak total of 9.88 in (251 mm) of precipitation in Greenwood Lake, New York. The subsequent floods in New Jersey forced the evacuation of about 200 people in Helmetta and the rescuing of almost 100 other people in Newark. In New York, heavy precipitation left waist-deep water in Brooklyn. Henri also spawned three tornadoes in Massachusetts, although each were small, weak, and short-lived, leaving minimal damage. Over 140,000 households across Connecticut, Massachusetts, New York, and Rhode Island lost electricity as a result of Henri. Altogether, the system caused an estimated $700 million in damage in the United States.

=== Hurricane Ida ===
- Category 4 hurricane (SSHWS)
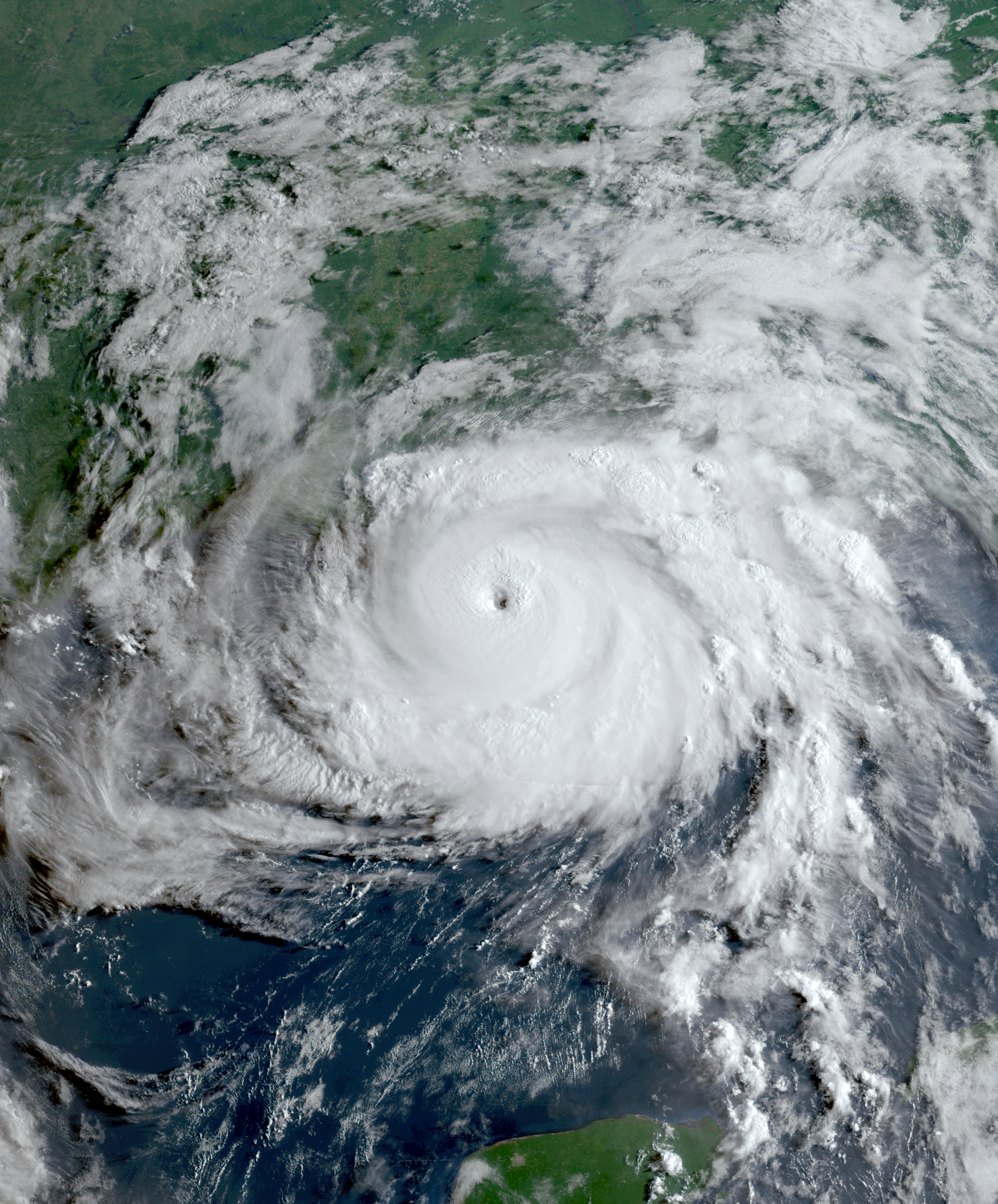
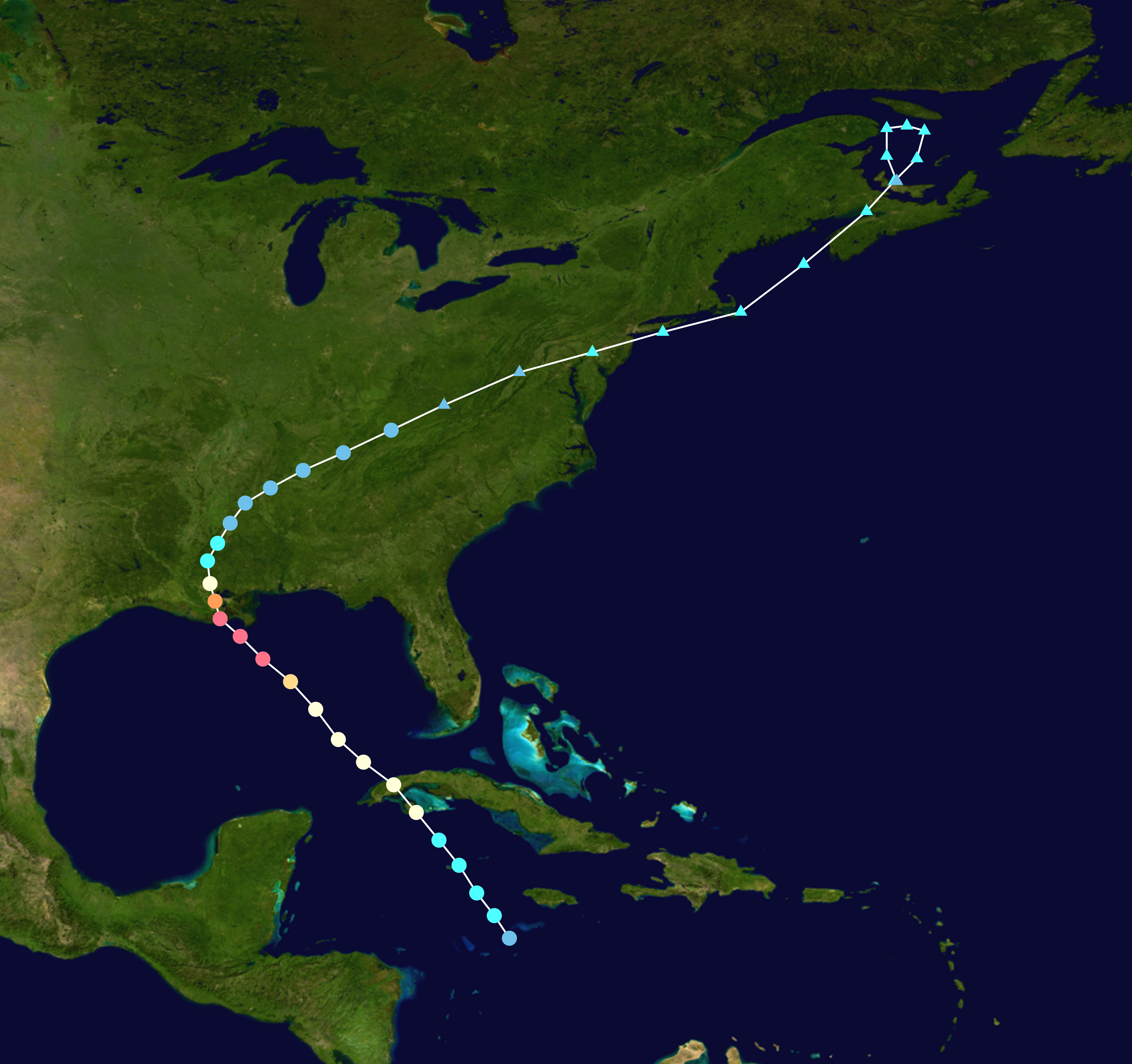
- Duration: August 26 – September 1
- Peak intensity: 150 mph (240 km/h) (1-min); 929 mbar (hPa)

Multiple systems, including a westward-moving tropical wave and a broad low-pressure area, began interacting in the Caribbean near the ABC islands on August 24. Convection associated with the disturbance increased and concentrated further over the next few days, resulting in the formation of a tropical depression around 12:00 UTC on August 26 just southwest of Jamaica. Six hours later, the depression intensified into Tropical Storm Ida, based on reconnaissance flight data. Moving northwestward, Ida strengthened quicker after passing the Cayman Islands, reaching hurricane status late on August 27. At 18:00 UTC, the cyclone struck Isla de la Juventud, Cuba, with winds of 80 mph (130 km/h) and then the mainland at 23:25 UTC near Playa Dayaniguas, Pinar del Río Province. After crossing Cuba and entering the Gulf of Mexico, Ida entered a region of light wind shear and water temperatures exceeding 86 °F (30 °C), resulting in rapid intensification, with the storm strengthening to a Category 2 hurricane early on August 29 and to a Category 3 hurricane within six hours as the system cleared out a warm eye. Thereafter, Ida became a Category 4 hurricane at 12:00 UTC as it neared the Louisiana coast. Simultaneously, the hurricane reached its peak intensity with maximum sustained wind speeds of 150 mph (240 km/h) and a minimum barometric pressure of 929 mbar (27.4 inHg).

At 16:55 UTC on August 29, Ida made landfall near Port Fourchon, Louisiana, with sustained winds of 150 mph (240 km/h) and a central pressure of 931 mbar (27.5 inHg), tying the 1856 Last Island hurricane and Hurricane Laura as the strongest landfalling hurricane on record in Louisiana, as measured by maximum sustained wind, and trailing only Hurricane Katrina, as measured by central pressure at landfall. Afterward, Ida weakened slowly at first, remaining a major hurricane until early the next day. As the storm moved further inland, Ida began to rapidly weaken, falling below hurricane strength around 12:00 UTC on August 30 while turning northeastward over Mississippi, before weakening to a depression at 00:00 UTC on August 31. Ida transitioned into an extratropical cyclone over West Virginia on September 1. Thereafter, the extratropical low briefly emerged into the Atlantic, continued northeastward into Atlantic Canada, and then stalled over the Gulf of St. Lawrence before being absorbed by another low developing to its east on September 4.

As Ida's precursor tropical wave passed near the westernmost Leeward Antilles, it began to interact with a broad area of low pressure located along the northern coast of South America, triggering damaging floods and landslides across Venezuela, leading to 20 deaths. In Cuba, Ida destroyed several homes in Pinar del Río Province, contributing to the country's $250 million damage estimate. The storm caused widespread significant damage throughout coastal southeast Louisiana; parts of the New Orleans metropolitan area were left without power for several weeks. Thousands of structures suffered damage, with nearly all buildings and homes in Lafourche and Jefferson parishes sustaining some degree of impact. Damage in Louisiana alone totaled about $55 billion. Significant wind damage extended northward into southwestern Mississippi, while approximately half of Amite County lost electricity. Ida also triggered a tornado outbreak that began with numerous weak tornadoes in Mississippi, Louisiana, and Alabama. The remnants of Ida subsequently spawned several destructive tornadoes in the Northeastern United States. An EF2 tornado caused considerable damage in Annapolis, Maryland, while a low-end EF2 tornado caused significant damage in Oxford, Pennsylvania. Another EF2 tornado caused a fatality in Upper Dublin Township, Pennsylvania, and a destructive EF3 tornado heavily damaged or destroyed multiple homes in Mullica Hill, New Jersey. Additionally, severe freshwater flooding impacted thousands of structures in the Northeastern United States, causing billions of dollars in damage each in New Jersey, New York, and Pennsylvania, including the shut down of most of the transportation systems in New York City. Ida's winds, rains, storm surges, and tornadoes resulted in at least $75 billion in damages and 87 deaths throughout the United States. Of the deaths in the United States, 55 deaths were direct and 32 were indirect, while a majority of those fatalities occurred in Louisiana, New Jersey, and New York.

=== Tropical Storm Kate ===
- Tropical storm (SSHWS)
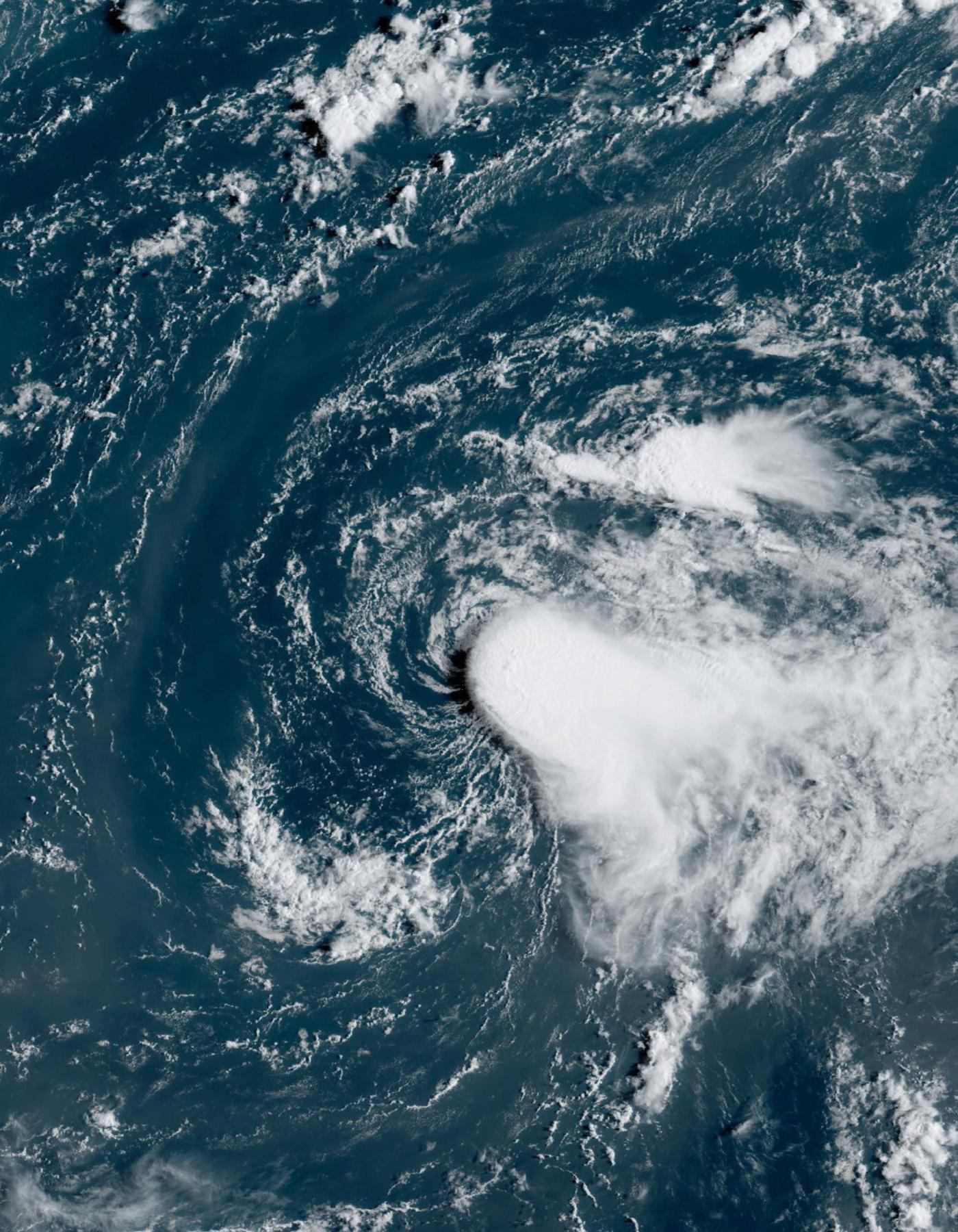
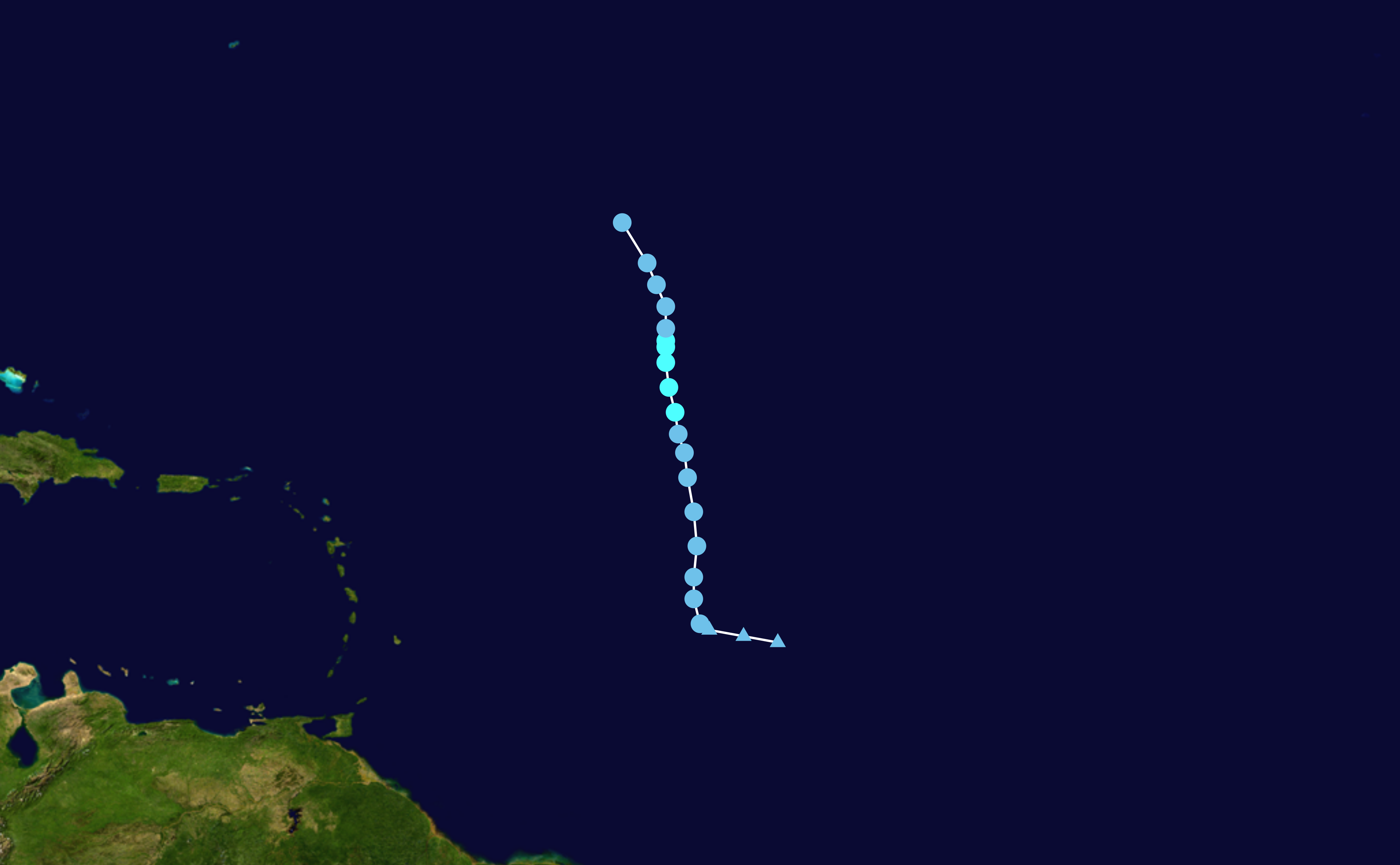
- Duration: August 28 – September 1
- Peak intensity: 45 mph (75 km/h) (1-min); 1004 mbar (hPa)

On August 22, a tropical wave exited the west coast of Africa and entered the Atlantic. The wave, accompanied by a broad area of low pressure, moved quickly to the west and west-northward, passing well south of the Cabo Verde Islands. After decelerating and curving northwestward due to a weakness in the subtropical ridge, the system organized into a tropical depression at 06:00 UTC on August 28 while situated approximately 805 mi (1,295 km) east of the Leeward Islands. The depression moved generally northward and remained weak due to strong wind shear generated by a broad mid-to-upper-level trough. A temporary burst in convection allowed the depression to intensify into Tropical Storm Kate early on August 30 and soon peaked with winds of 45 mph (72 km/h) and a minimum pressure of 1,004 mbar (29.6 inHg). However, strong wind shear and very dry mid-level air caused Kate to weaken to a tropical depression on August 31. By 18:00 UTC on September 1, Kate degenerated into a trough about 960 mi (1,545 km) northeast of the Leeward Islands. The remnants continued north-northwestward until dissipating a few days later.

=== Tropical Storm Julian ===
- Tropical storm (SSHWS)
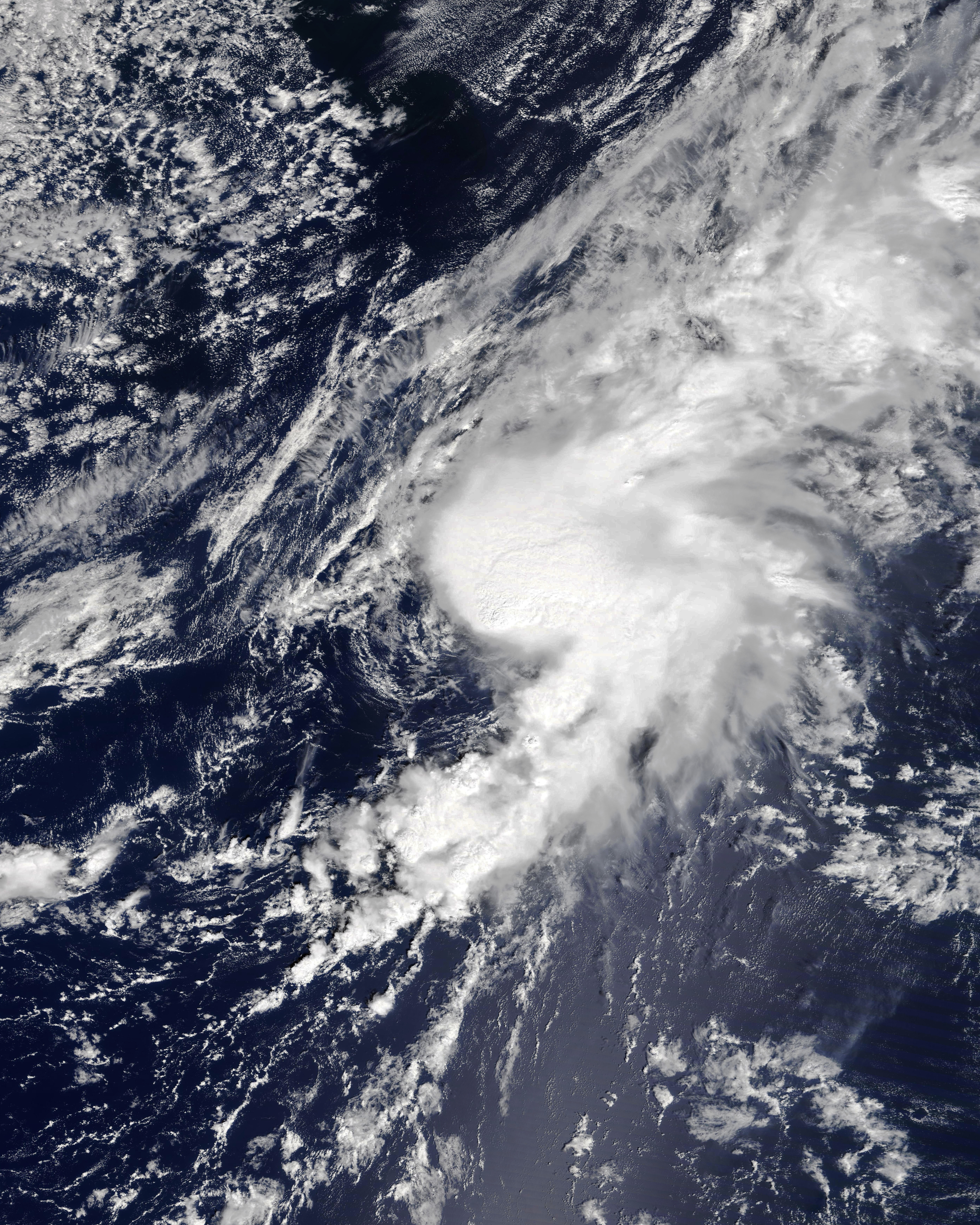
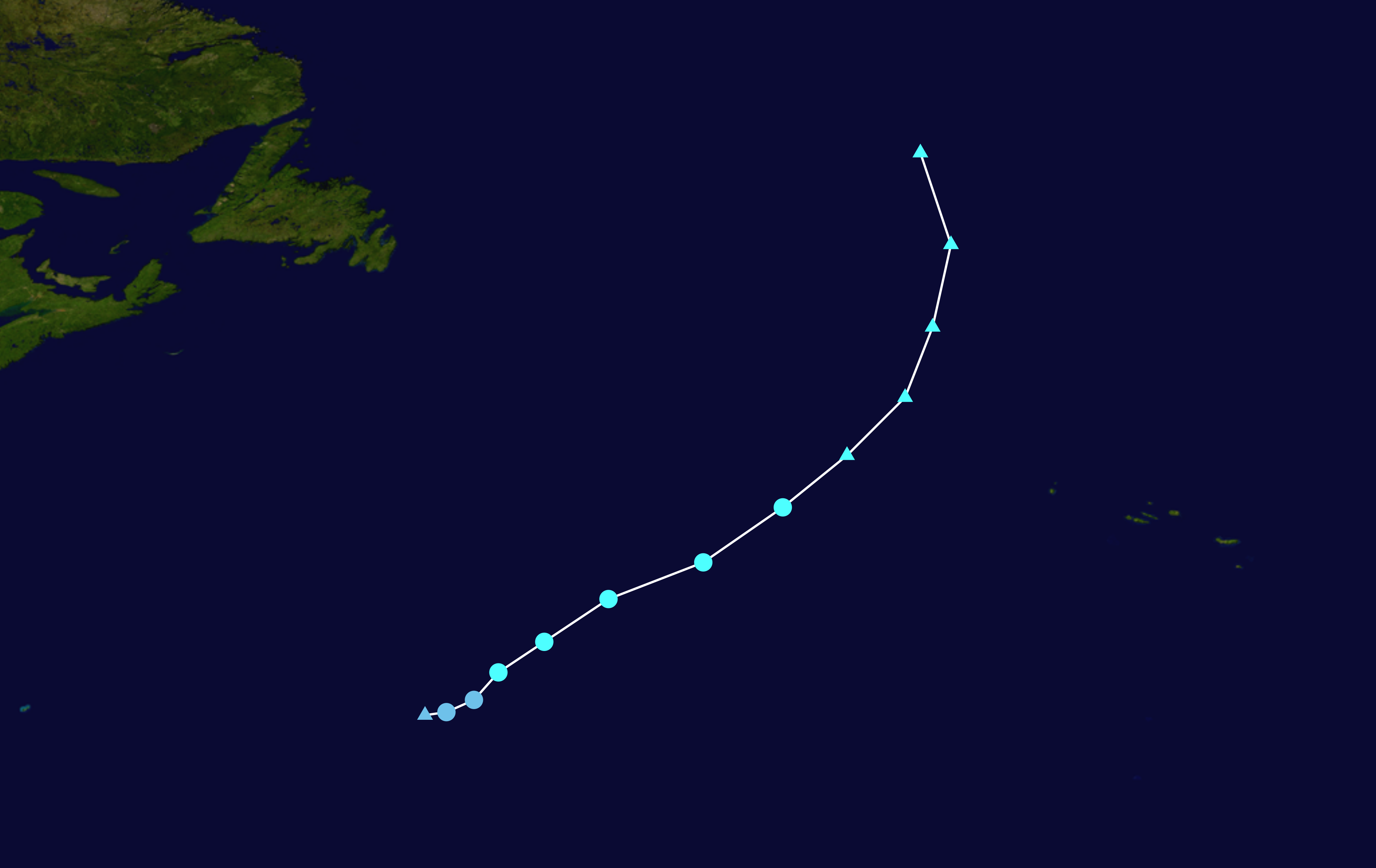
- Duration: August 28 – August 30
- Peak intensity: 60 mph (95 km/h) (1-min); 993 mbar (hPa)

A tropical wave emerged into the Atlantic from the west coast of Africa on August 20. After the wave split between August 23 and August 24, its northern portion tracked northwestward toward a subtropical ridge and later northward around the ridge's western periphery. Favorable conditions such as warm sea surface temperatures and low wind shear allowed the disturbance to acquire deep convection and a low-level circulation. Consequently, the system became a tropical depression at 18:00 UTC on August 28 approximately 890 mi (1,430 km) east of Bermuda. Early the next day, the depression attained wind speeds of a tropical storm and was named Julian. Although wind shear left convection displaced to the northeast of Julian's center, seas remained warm, allowing some intensification as the storm headed rapidly northeastward due to an approaching cold front. Late on August 29, Julian peaked with winds of 60 mph (97 km/h) and a minimum pressure of 993 mbar (29.3 inHg). However, the storm soon began interacting with the cold front and transitioned into an extratropical cyclone around 12:00 UTC on August 30 about 865 mi (1,390 km) east-southeast of Cape Race, Newfoundland. The remnants of Julian turned northward on August 31 and merged with a large extratropical system over the far north Atlantic later that day.

=== Hurricane Larry ===
- Category 3 hurricane (SSHWS)
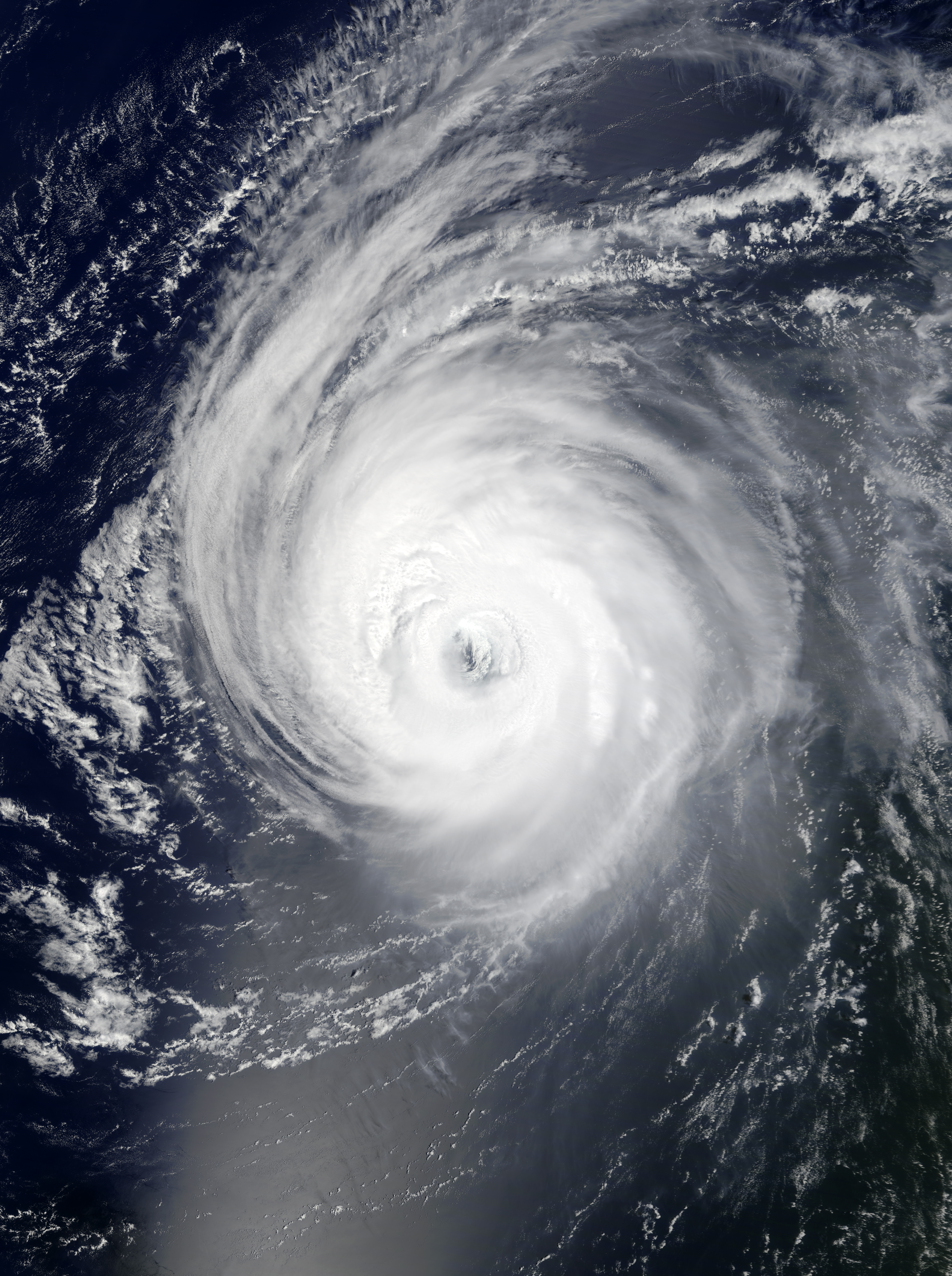
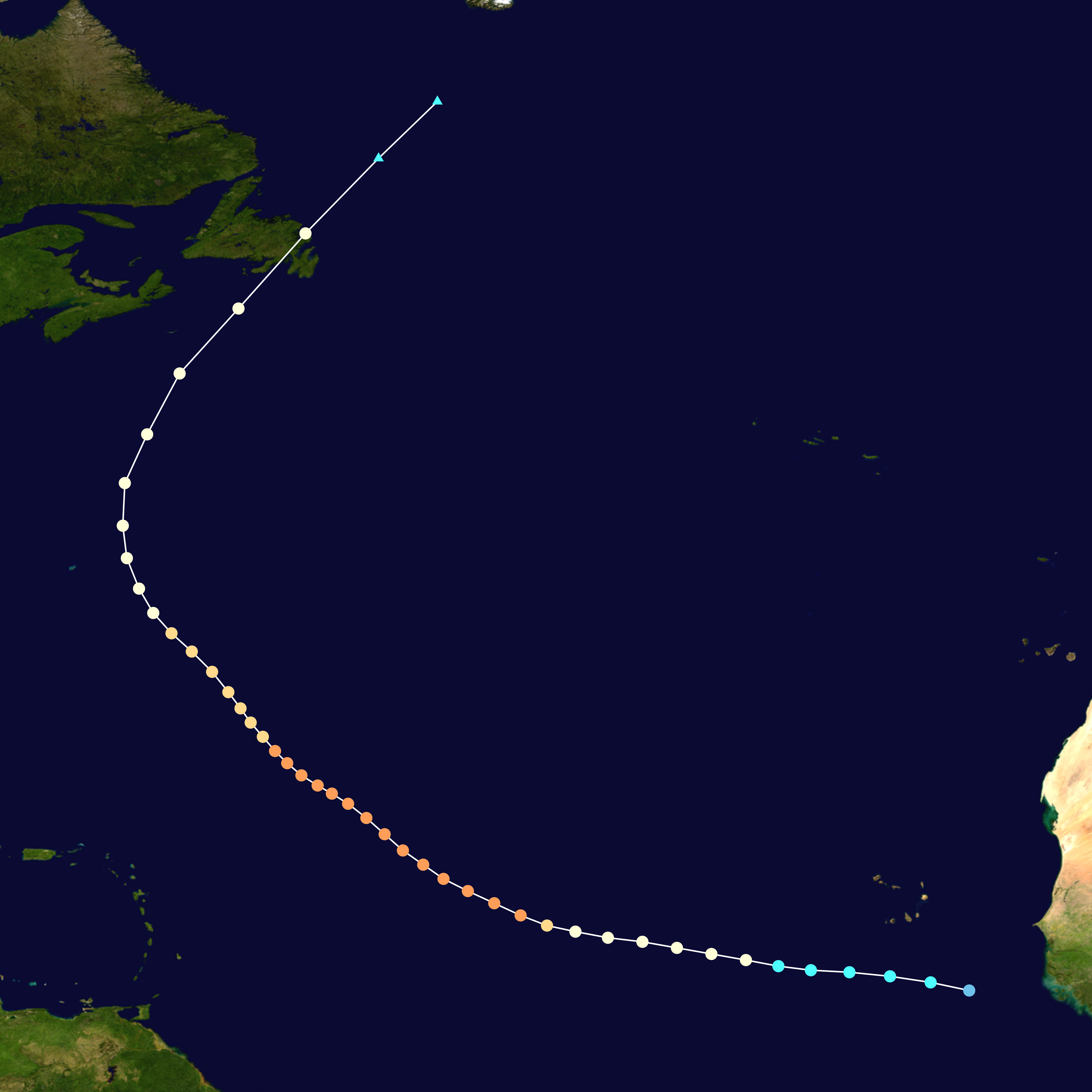
- Duration: August 31 – September 11
- Peak intensity: 125 mph (205 km/h) (1-min); 953 mbar (hPa)

On August 30, a strong tropical wave and an accompanying broad area of low pressure emerged off the west coast of Africa. Deep convection quickly began to increase around the eastern portion of the circulation as it moved over the far eastern tropical Atlantic. The system organized into a tropical depression at 18:00 UTC on August 31 while located about 320 mi (520 km) south-southeast of the Cabo Verde Islands. The depression intensified into Tropical Storm Larry six hours later. Located within favorable atmospheric and oceanic conditions, the cyclone steadily strengthened while moving generally westward across the Atlantic to the south of a strong mid-level ridge. A small inner-core developed late on September 1, and, by 06:00 UTC on September 2, a well-defined low- to midlevel eye feature became apparent, indicating that Larry had attained hurricane status. The storm intensified to Category 2 strength late on September 3. Then, after battling against some shear and an intrusion of dry mid-level air during an eyewall replacement cycle, Larry became a Category 3 major hurricane by 00:00 UTC on September 4. While maintaining Category 3 status for multiple days, Larry gained annular characteristics and completed two eyewall replacement cycles.

Around 12:00 UTC on September 5, the hurricane attained its peak intensity with maximum sustained winds of 125 mph (201 km/h) and a minimum barometric pressure of 953 mbar (28.1 inHg). However, by September 7, the eyewall became less defined as the convection decreased. Early the next day, Larry weakened to a Category 2 hurricane as it began encountering decreasing sea surface temperatures. On September 9, the system weakened to a Category 1 hurricane while located roughly 285 mi (460 km) southeast of Bermuda. At 03:30 UTC on September 11, Larry made landfall in Newfoundland along the Burin Peninsula. While crossing the Labrador Sea later that day, the storm transitioned into a post-tropical cyclone, which was subsequently absorbed by a larger extratropical system by early on September 12 about halfway between Newfoundland and Greenland.

Rough surf and rip currents generated by Larry's large wind field led to five drownings, one each in the U.S. Virgin Islands, Puerto Rico, South Carolina, Florida, and Virginia. In Newfoundland, high winds uprooted many trees, knocked down power lines, and damaged some roofs. Almost 61,000 customers lost electricity, with most along the Avalon Peninsula. Damages assessed on Newfoundland were estimated at $80 million. The remnants of the cyclone produced snowfall totals up to 4 ft (1.2 m) and hurricane-force winds in Greenland.

=== Tropical Storm Mindy ===
- Tropical storm (SSHWS)
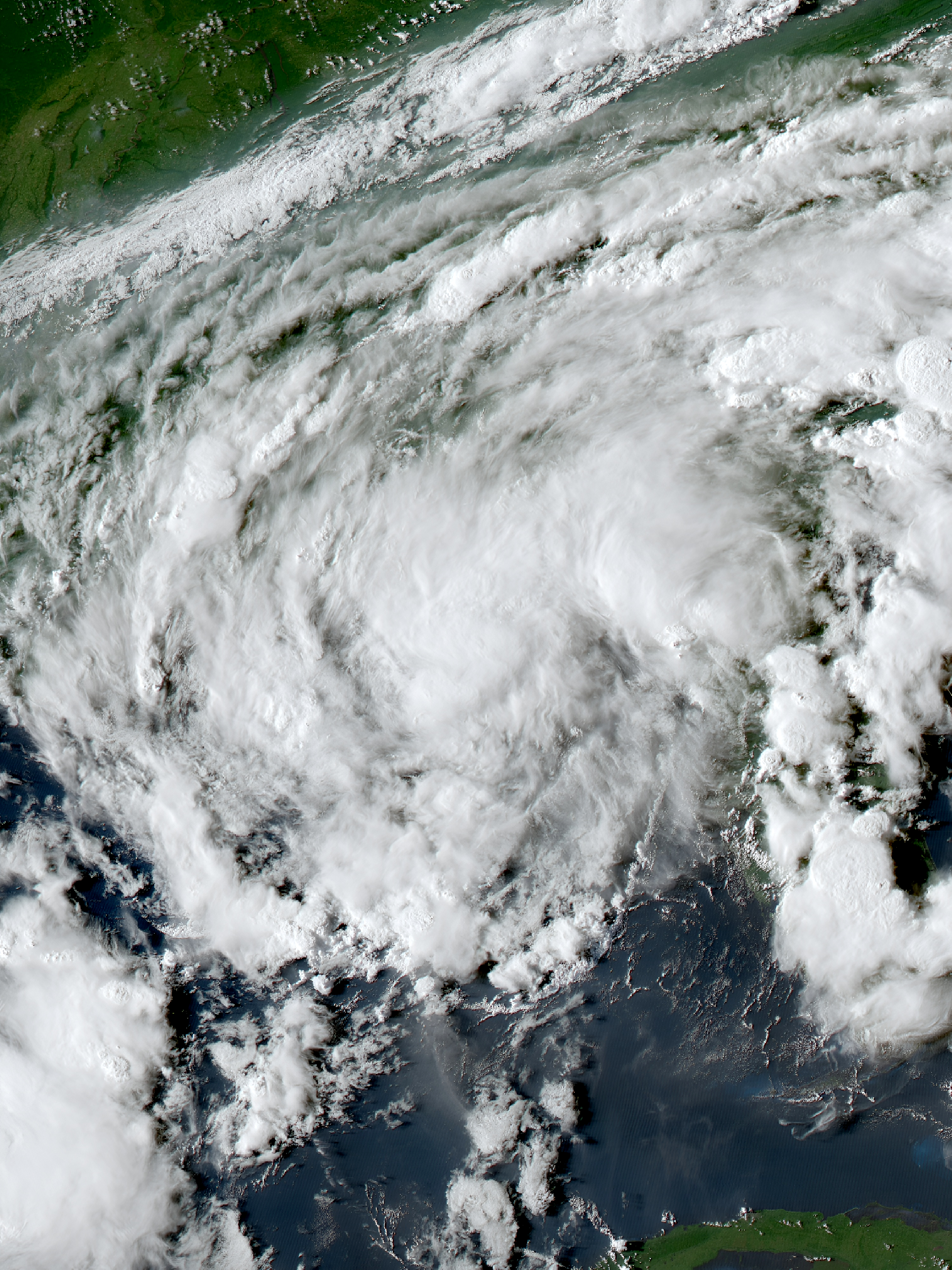
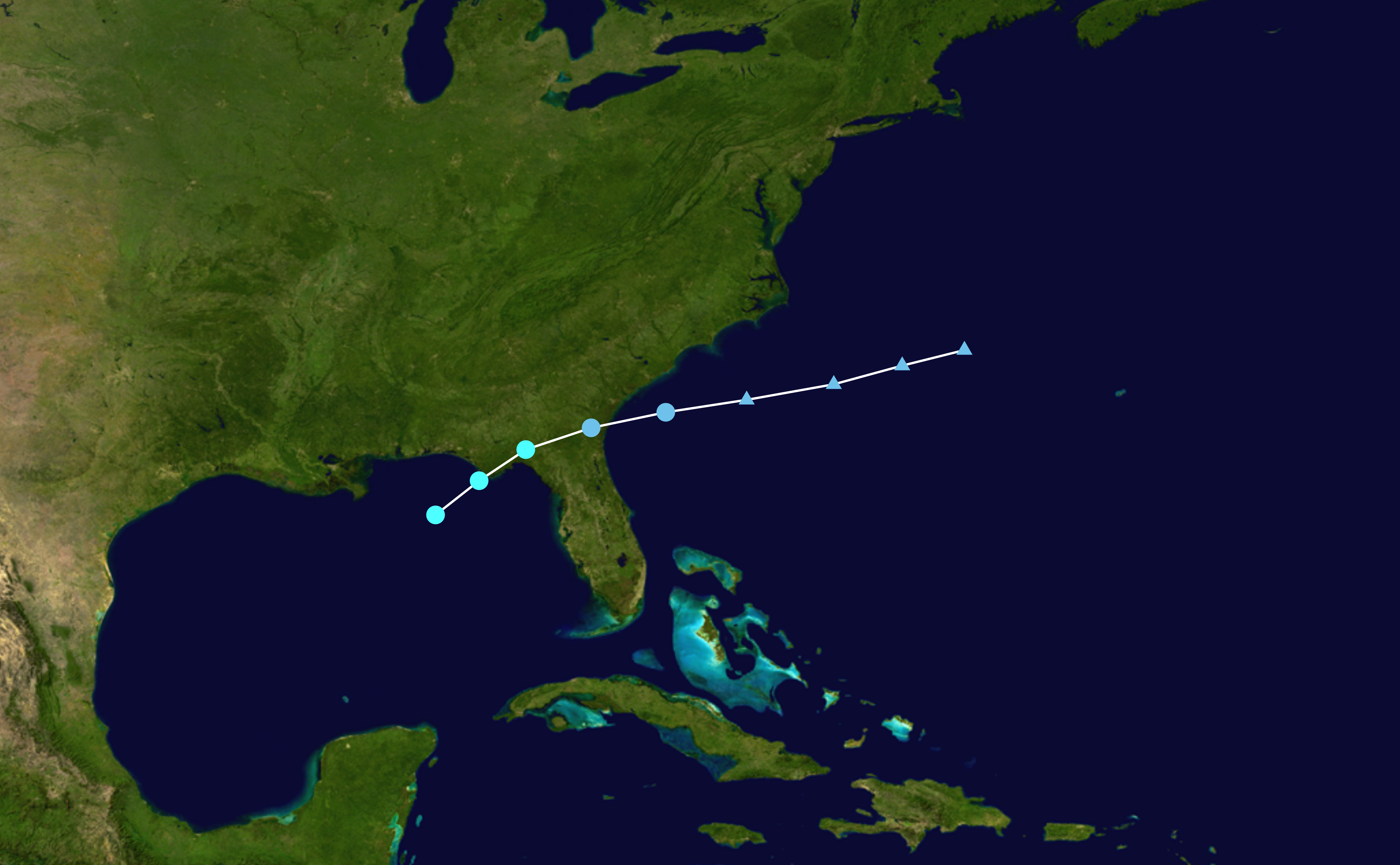
- Duration: September 8 – September 9
- Peak intensity: 60 mph (95 km/h) (1-min); 1000 mbar (hPa)

On August 22, a tropical wave exited the west coast of Africa and moved westward into the Atlantic. Part of the wave split-off and became Tropical Storm Kate on August 28, and another part of the wave contributed to the development of Hurricane Olaf in the eastern Pacific. The remainder of the wave entered the Gulf of Mexico on September 5. A burst in deep convection late on September 8 resulted in the formation of Tropical Storm Mindy over the northeastern Gulf of Mexico. Mindy attained peak winds of 60 mph (97 km/h) and a minimum pressure of 1,000 mbar (30 inHg) before it made landfall on St. Vincent Island, Florida, at 01:15 UTC on the following day. Heading east-northeastward, the storm weakened to a tropical depression over southeast Georgia, and degenerated into a remnant low late on September 9 after emerging into the Atlantic. The remnant circulation merged with a baroclinic zone area on September 11.

The system which later became Mindy produced heavy rainfall in Mexico from September 2 to September 7, especially in Hidalgo, Jalisco, Mexico state, Mexico City, and Morelos. Subsequent floods damaged approximately 31,000 homes and caused at least 23 deaths across Mexico. In Hidalgo, the Rosas and Tula rivers overflowed their banks. A total of 17 fatalities occurred in Atotonilco de Tula, where more than 1,000 people evacuated, including 41 people from a flooded hospital. Damage in Mexico totaled approximately $75 million. In Florida, Mindy spawned an EF0 tornado, although it only caused minor tree damage in Wakulla County. Winds generated by the storm mainly resulted in power outages, with about 10,000 in the Florida Panhandle and a few thousand in southeast Georgia, although falling trees damaged two homes and destroyed a mobile home in Leon County, Florida. Additionally, downed trees blocked several roads in the Tallahassee metropolitan area. Throughout the United States, Mindy caused about $123,000 in damage.

=== Hurricane Nicholas ===
- Category 1 hurricane (SSHWS)
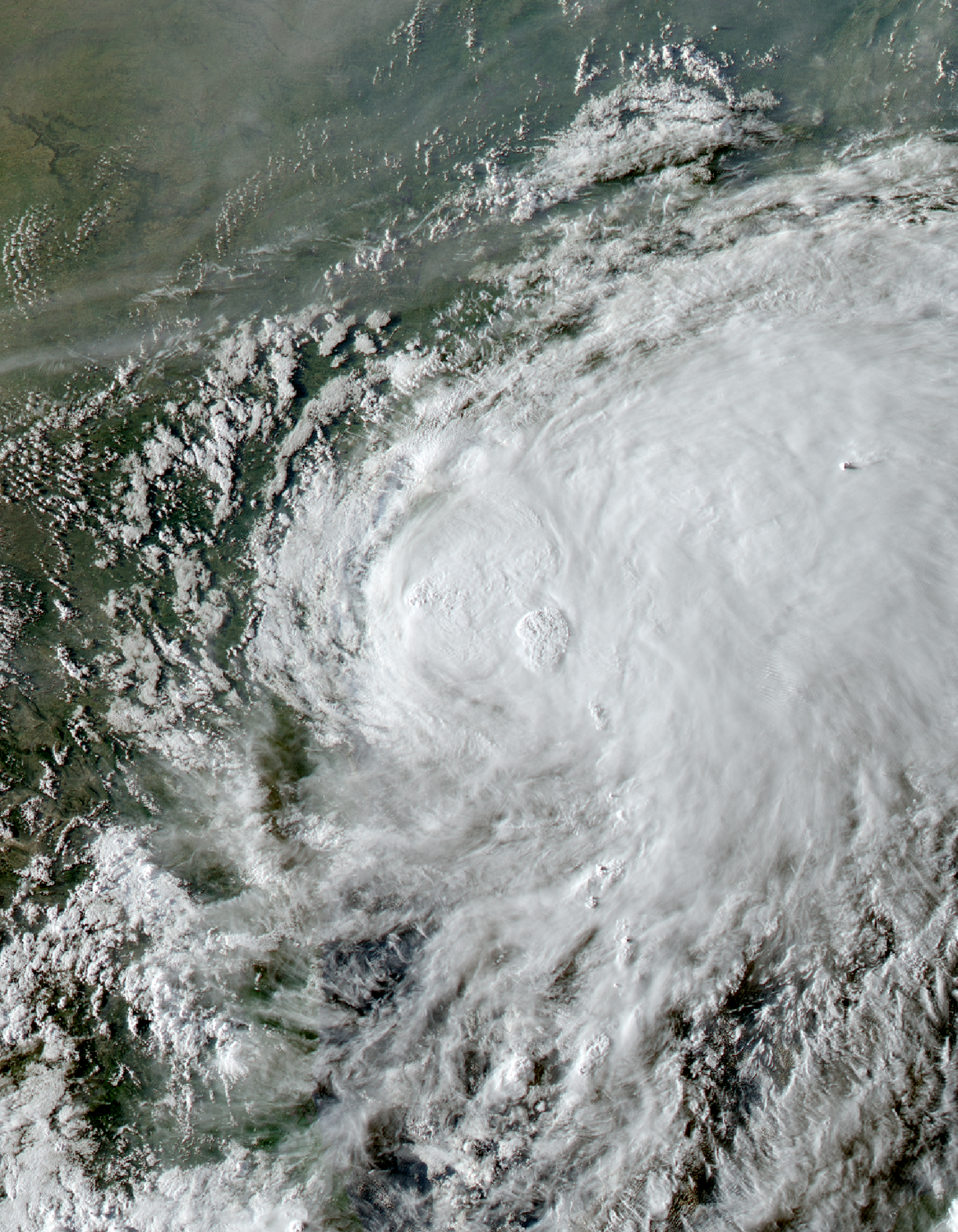
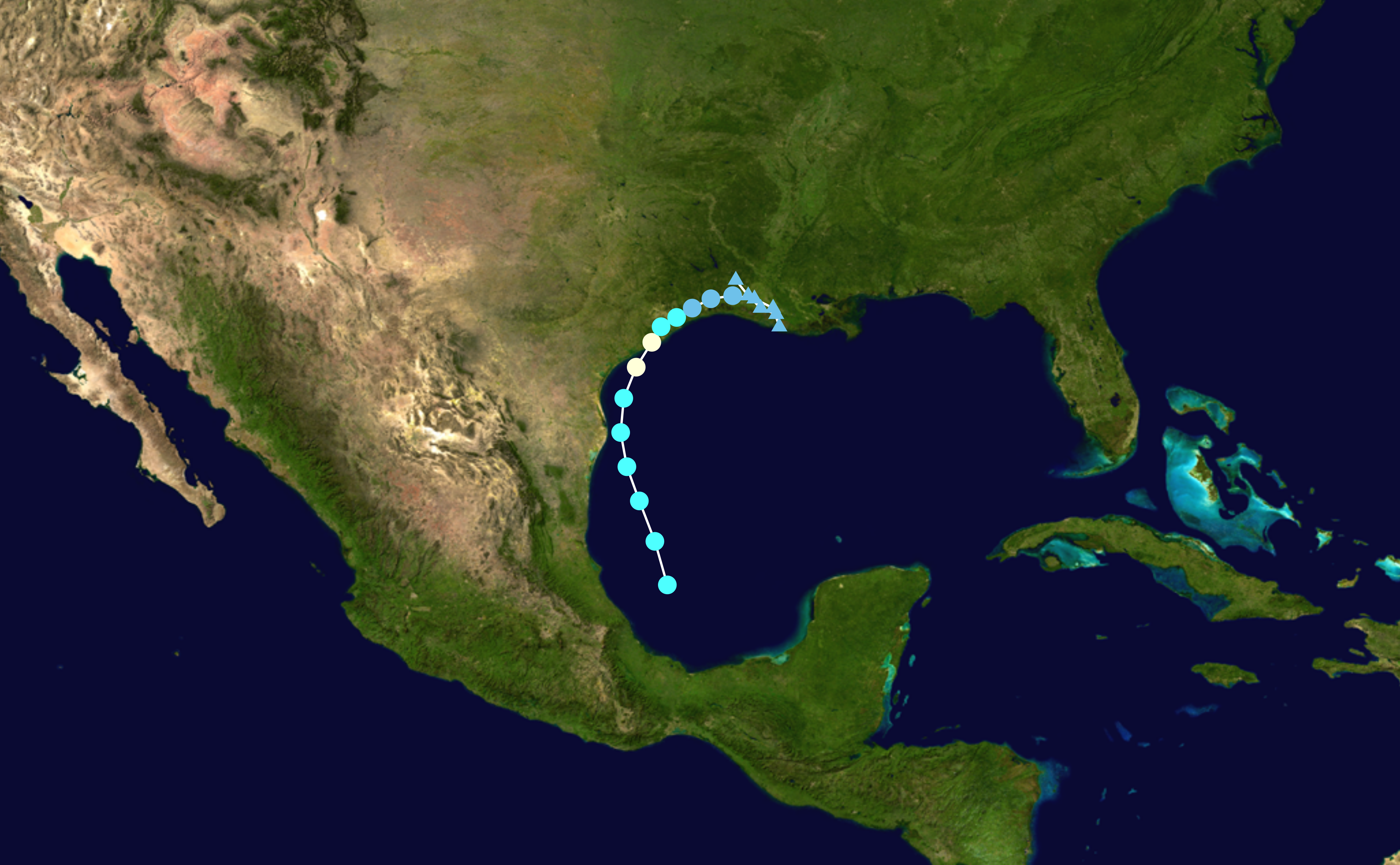
- Duration: September 12 – September 15
- Peak intensity: 75 mph (120 km/h) (1-min); 988 mbar (hPa)

A tropical wave moved across the Atlantic and Caribbean, reaching the Gulf of Mexico on September 11. The system became Tropical Storm Nicholas around 12:00 UTC on September 12 over the Bay of Campeche. Nicholas strengthened gradually due to moderate wind shear. It headed north-northwestward at first, before turning north-northeastward. Based on a weather station at Matagorda Bay reporting sustained hurricane-force winds, Nicholas intensified into a hurricane around 00:00 UTC on September 14. Shortly thereafter, at 05:30 UTC, Nicholas made landfall near Sargent Beach, Texas, with maximum sustained winds of 75 mph (121 km/h). The system quickly weakened inland, degenerating into a remnant low on September 15 over southwestern Louisiana. The low meandered over Louisiana and briefly re-emerged into the Gulf of Mexico before being absorbed by a mid-latitude trough on September 20.

Nicholas produced tropical-storm force wind gusts in portions of northeastern Mexico, including a gust of 43 mph (69 km/h) in Bagdad, Tamaulipas. In Texas, strong winds, storm surge, and abnormally high tides impacted the coast, especially in Brazoria and Matagorda counties. There, the storm downed many trees, damaged or destroyed many piers and roofs, and caused severe erosion, while wave action resulted in water entering some homes. Fort Bend, Galveston, and Harris counties experienced similar impacts but to a lesser extent. Additionally, several counties in Southeast Texas reported localized and flash flooding. At least 500,000 structures in Texas lost electricity during the storm. Nicholas and its remnants also produced heavy rainfall and flooding across the Deep South, especially in Louisiana, where up to 17.29 in (439 mm) of precipitation fell in Tangipahoa Parish. Numerous road closures occurred, many of them in parts of eastern Louisiana, while water entered some homes in St. Charles Parish. Further, nearly 120,000 customers lost electricity in the state. Freshwater flooding caused two deaths in Alabama. Additional fatalities occurred in Florida when rip currents swept away two people at Panama City Beach. Throughout the United States, Nicholas caused approximately $1 billion in damage.

=== Tropical Storm Odette ===
- Tropical storm (SSHWS)
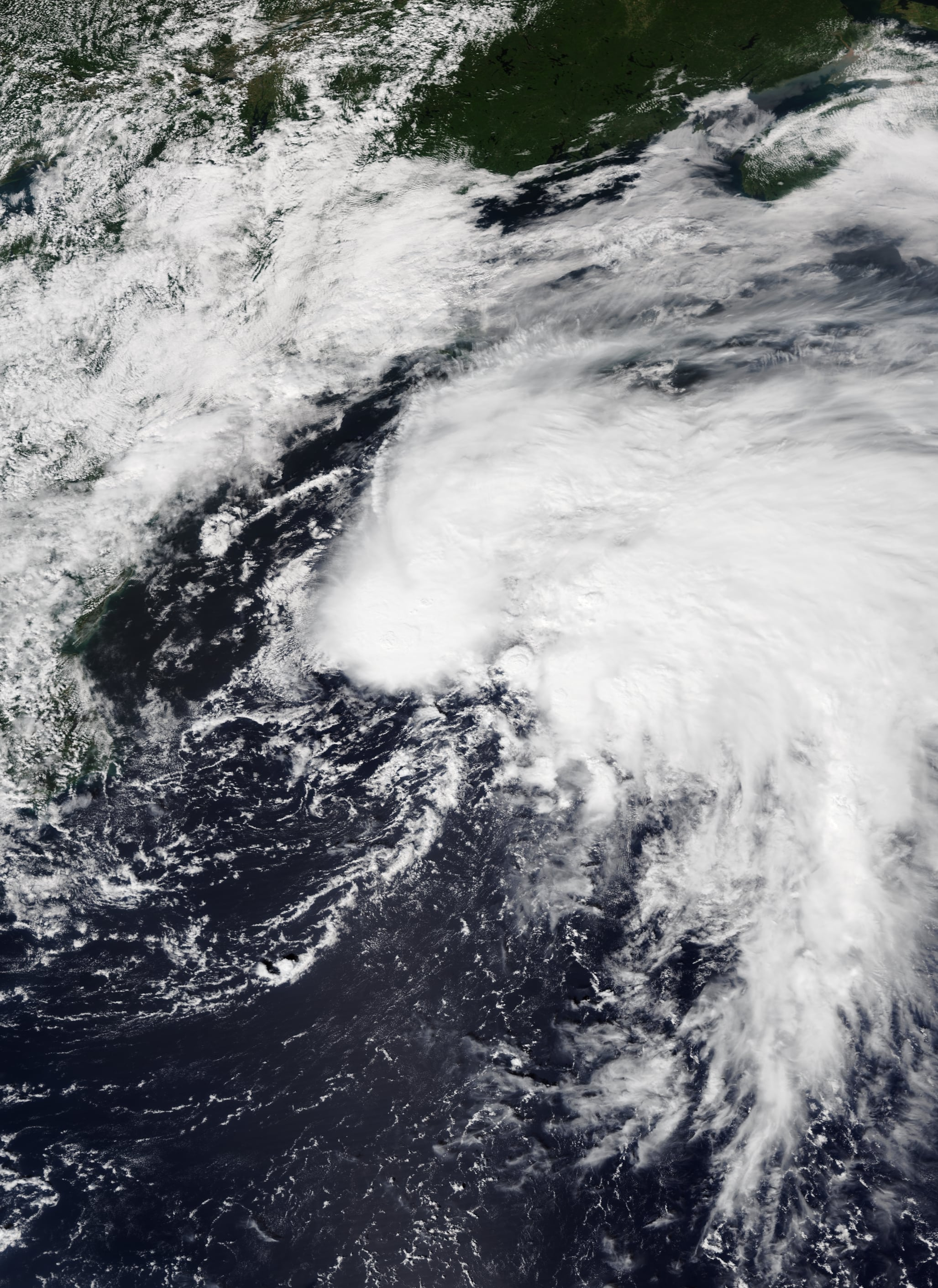
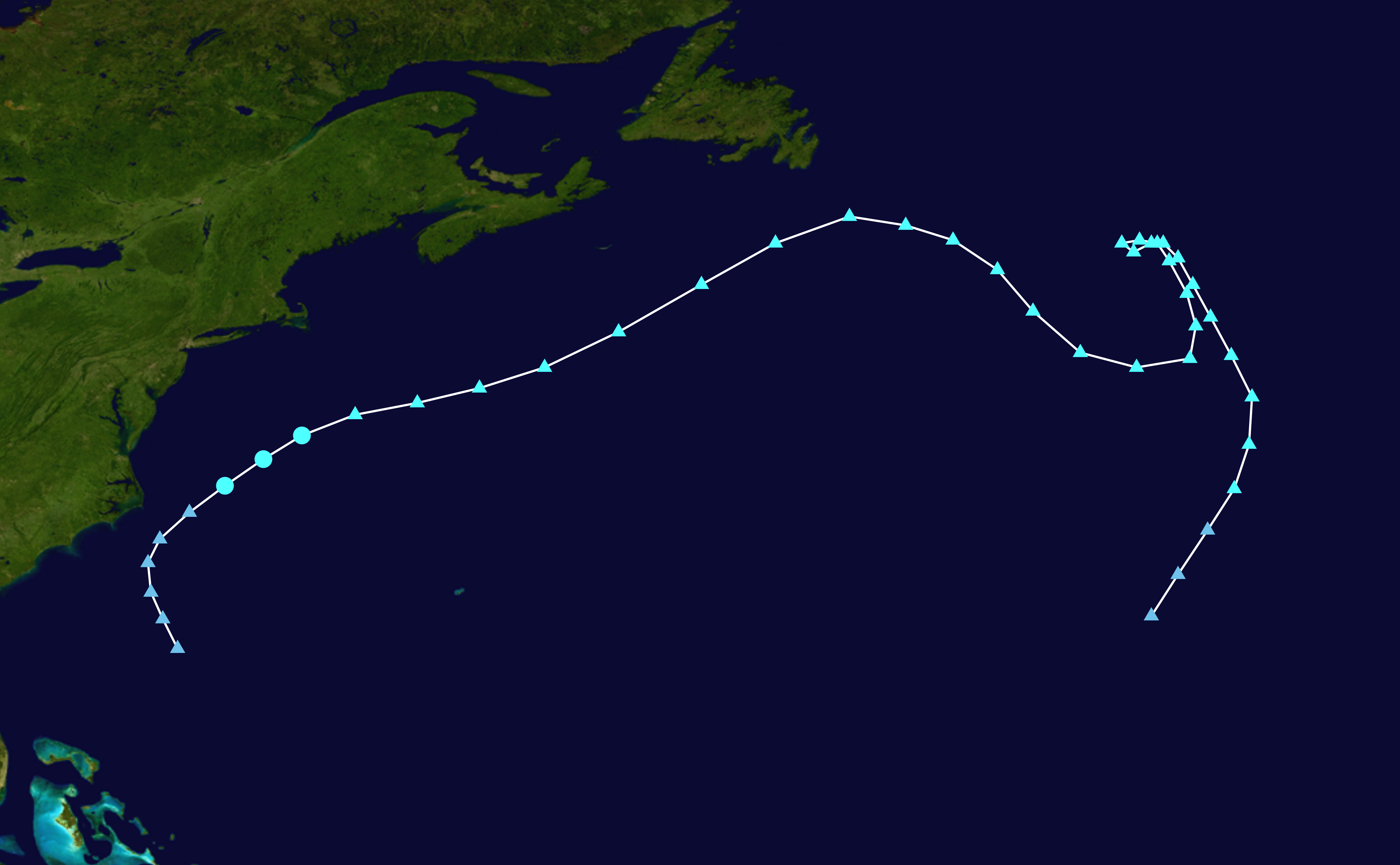
- Duration: September 17 – September 18
- Peak intensity: 45 mph (75 km/h) (1-min); 1005 mbar (hPa)

On September 11, the NHC began monitoring an area of disturbed weather over the southeastern Bahamas. As the system moved northwestward to north-northwestward, a low-pressure area formed well east of northeast Florida early on September 16. Despite the low having a relatively well-defined circulation, convection was disorganized and displaced from the center due to wind shear. By 18:00 UTC on September 17, the system organized into Tropical Storm Odette about 175 mi (280 km) east of the North Carolina–Virginia state line. Early on the following day, however, the cyclone was already beginning to lose tropical characteristics due to colder and drier air. During this process, its deep convection was consistently displaced well to the east of a poorly defined center due to strong westerly wind shear. The system's circulation was elongated from southwest to northeast and contained multiple low-cloud swirls. Odette completed an extratropical transition by 12:00 UTC on September 18, about 290 mi (465 km) east-southeast of Atlantic City, New Jersey. The remnants of Odette retained gale-force winds and continued moving out into the central Atlantic, curving northeastward, before turning southward, making a slow counterclockwise curve. During this time, the NHC monitored Odette's remnants for the potential to redevelop into a subtropical or tropical cyclone. However, the remnants of Odette failed to organize further, and it succumbed to high upper-level winds. Thereafter, a strengthening ridge situated over the northwestern Atlantic caused the remnants of Odette to turn south-southeastward and later to the south-southwest. The extratropical low degenerated into a trough on September 27.

In New Jersey, one person drowned due to a rip current.

=== Tropical Storm Peter ===
- Tropical storm (SSHWS)
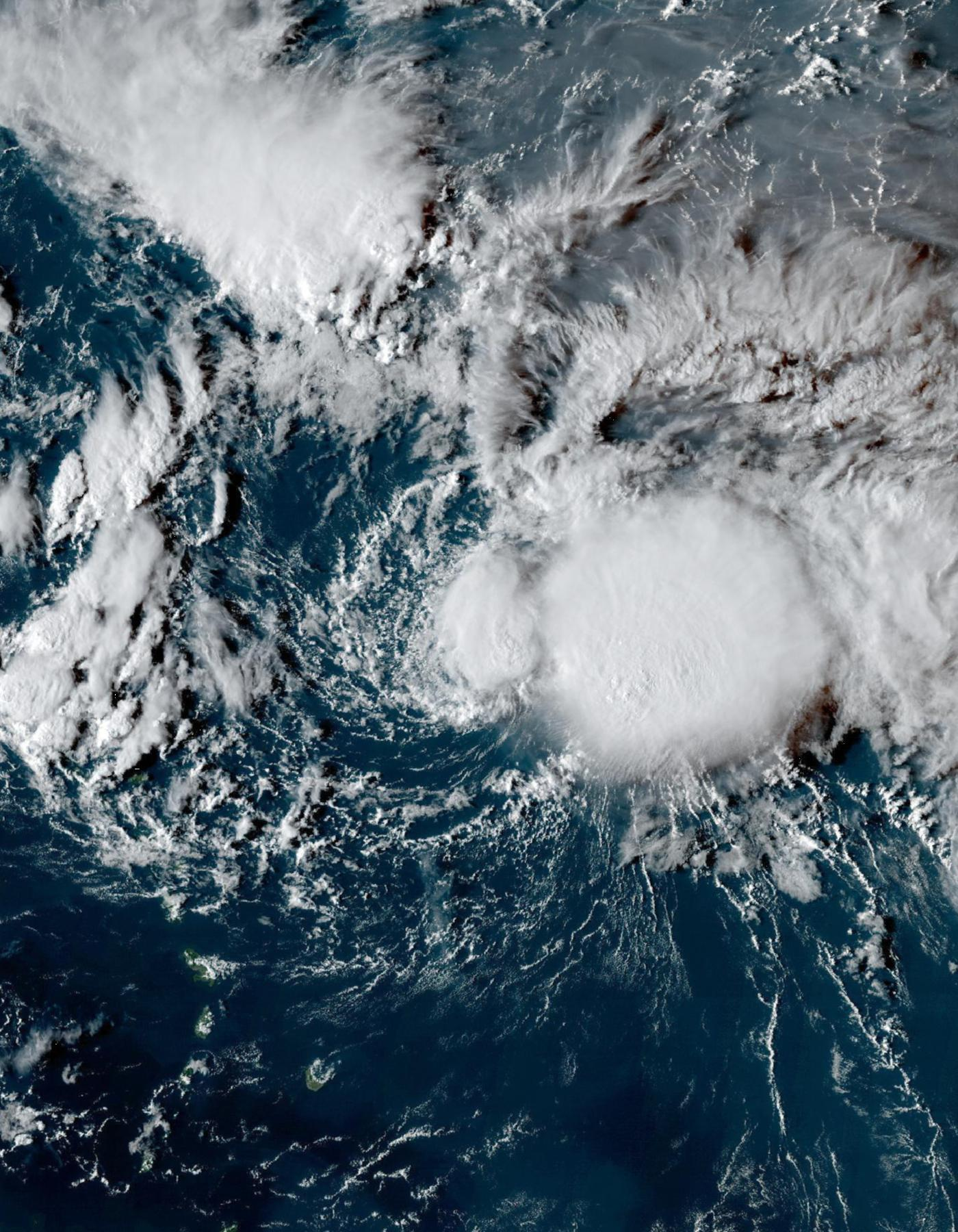
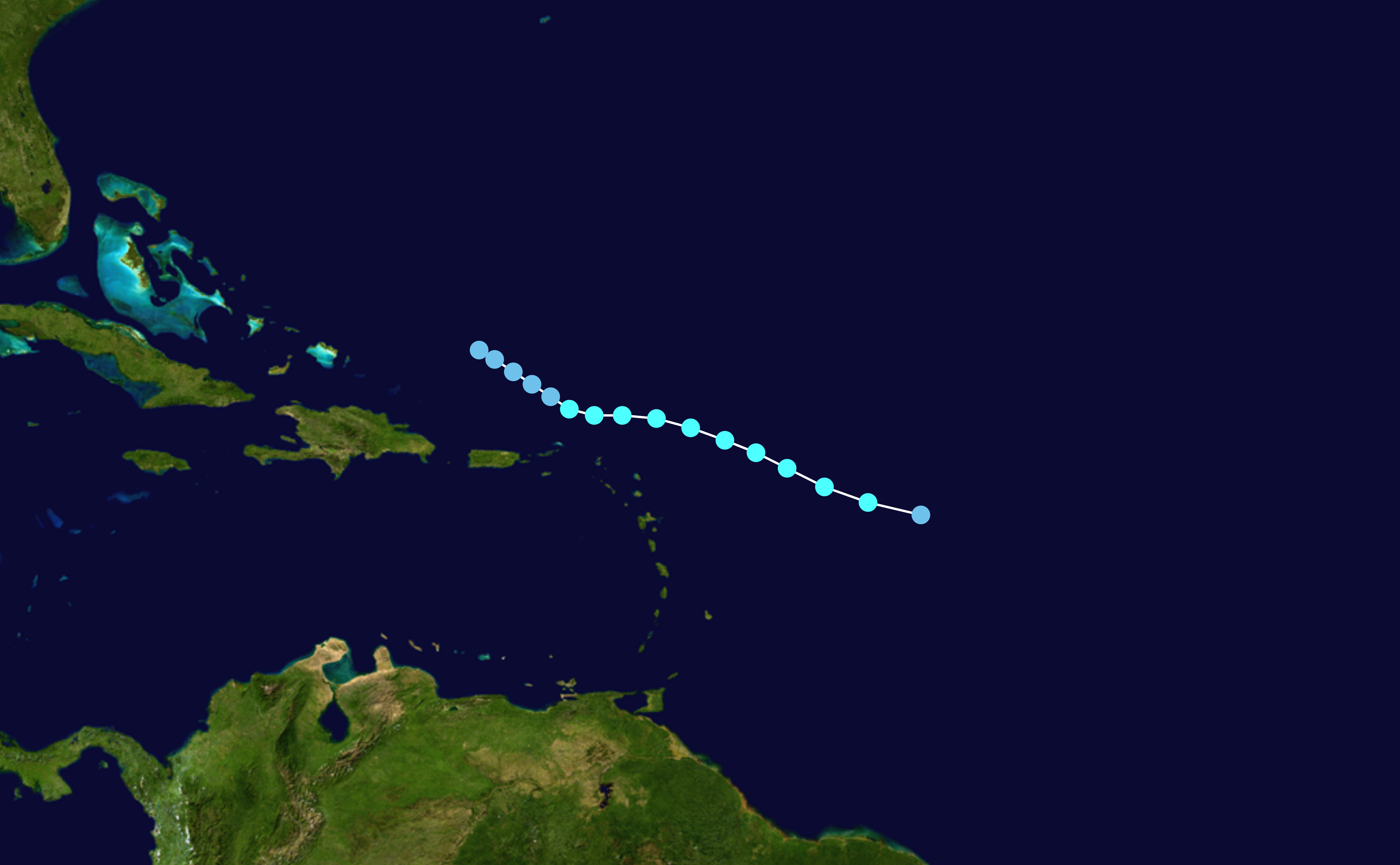
- Duration: September 19 – September 22
- Peak intensity: 50 mph (85 km/h) (1-min); 1005 mbar (hPa)

On September 8, the NHC began monitoring a tropical wave over west Africa. The wave emerged into the Atlantic between September 13 and September 14, producing a large burst of convection but lacking a closed circulation. Moving westward, convection became more concentrated over the next few days, and by late on September 18, the system acquired a closed circulation according to a NOAA buoy and satellite imagery. As a result, a tropical depression developed by 00:00 UTC on September 19 about 605 mi (975 km) east of the Leeward Islands. Six hours later, the depression intensified into Tropical Storm Peter. Relatively light wind shear and warm seas allowed Peter to reach a peak intensity with winds of 50 mph (80 km/h) and a minimum pressure of 1,005 mbar (29.7 inHg) late on September 19. However, as the storm approached the northern Leeward Islands on September 20, it encountered nearly 35 mph (55 km/h) of southwesterly wind shear from a nearby upper low. As a result, Peter's low-level center was displaced west of its showers and thunderstorms. Later on September 21, the system weakened to a tropical depression and degenerated into a trough about 230 mi (370 km) north of Puerto Rico around 00:00 UTC on September 23. Although the NHC monitored the remnants due to the potential for redevelopment, the system dissipated well south of Newfoundland on September 29.

The system brought heavy rain showers to the northern Leeward Islands, Virgin Islands, and Puerto Rico on September 21, as it tracked to their north. In Puerto Rico, the towns of Lares and Morovis both observed up to 3.76 in (96 mm) of precipitation, although parts of the former may have experienced rainfall totals up to 5 to 6 in (130 to 150 mm). This caused a few mudslides and minor flooding in some areas, including in Carolina, Corozal, Utuado, and Vega Baja. Damage on Puerto Rico totaled about $12,000.

=== Tropical Storm Rose ===
- Tropical storm (SSHWS)
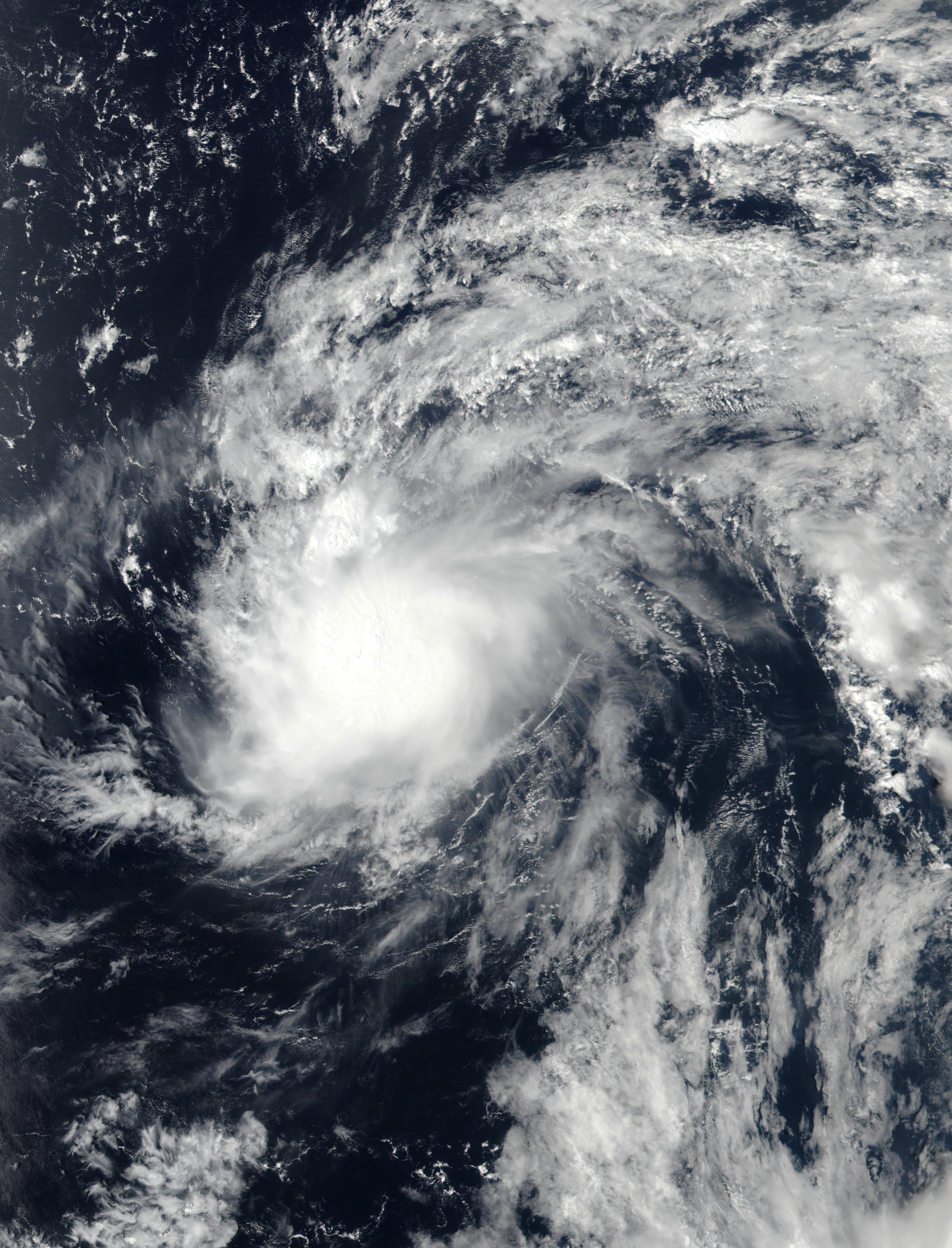
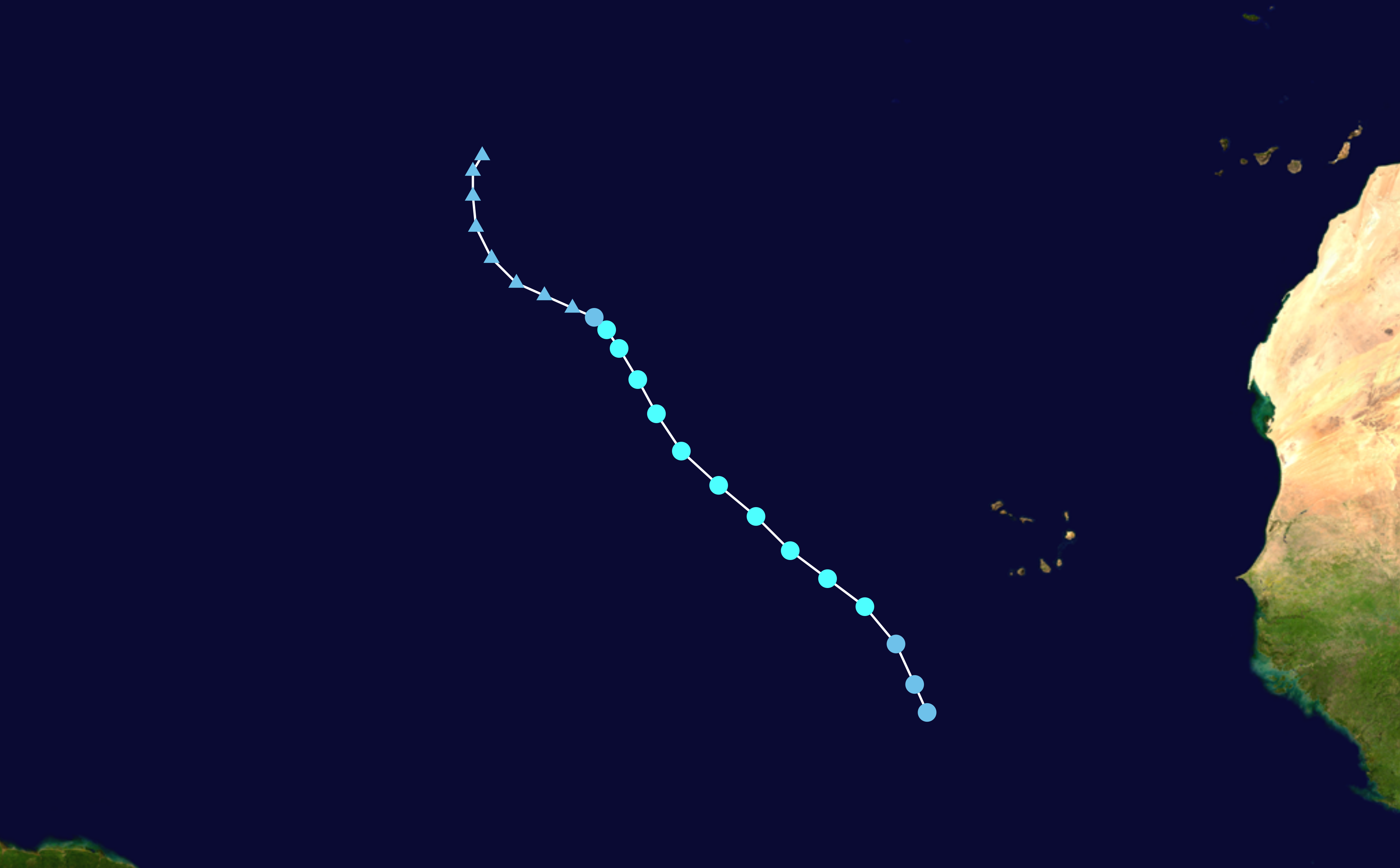
- Duration: September 19 – September 22
- Peak intensity: 60 mph (95 km/h) (1-min); 1004 mbar (hPa)

The National Hurricane Center began monitoring a tropical wave approaching the Atlantic coast of Africa on September 14. After moving into the far eastern tropical Atlantic early on September 16, the wave acquired a low-pressure center, though it remained disorganized. By 00:00 UTC on September 19, the disturbance had acquired a well-defined circulation and enough organized deep convection for it to be designated a tropical depression around 375 mi (605 km) south-southwest of the Cabo Verde Islands. Despite wind shear and dry air impacting the depression's eastern quadrants, satellite images showed that the deep convection increased within the cyclone and that its overall structure continued to improve, with the system becoming Tropical Storm Rose late on September 19. Around 00:00 UTC on September 21, Rose peaked with winds of 60 mph (97 km/h) and a minimum pressure of 1,004 mbar (29.6 inHg). However, a sharp increase in wind shear weakened the cyclone to a minimal tropical storm several hours later and to a tropical depression early the next day. By 12:00 UTC on September 22, Rose degenerated into a remnant low while situated roughly 980 mi (1,575 km) west-northwest of the Cabo Verde Islands. The low moved northwestward until curving northward on the following day. Early on September 24, the low became an open trough.

=== Hurricane Sam ===
- Category 4 hurricane (SSHWS)
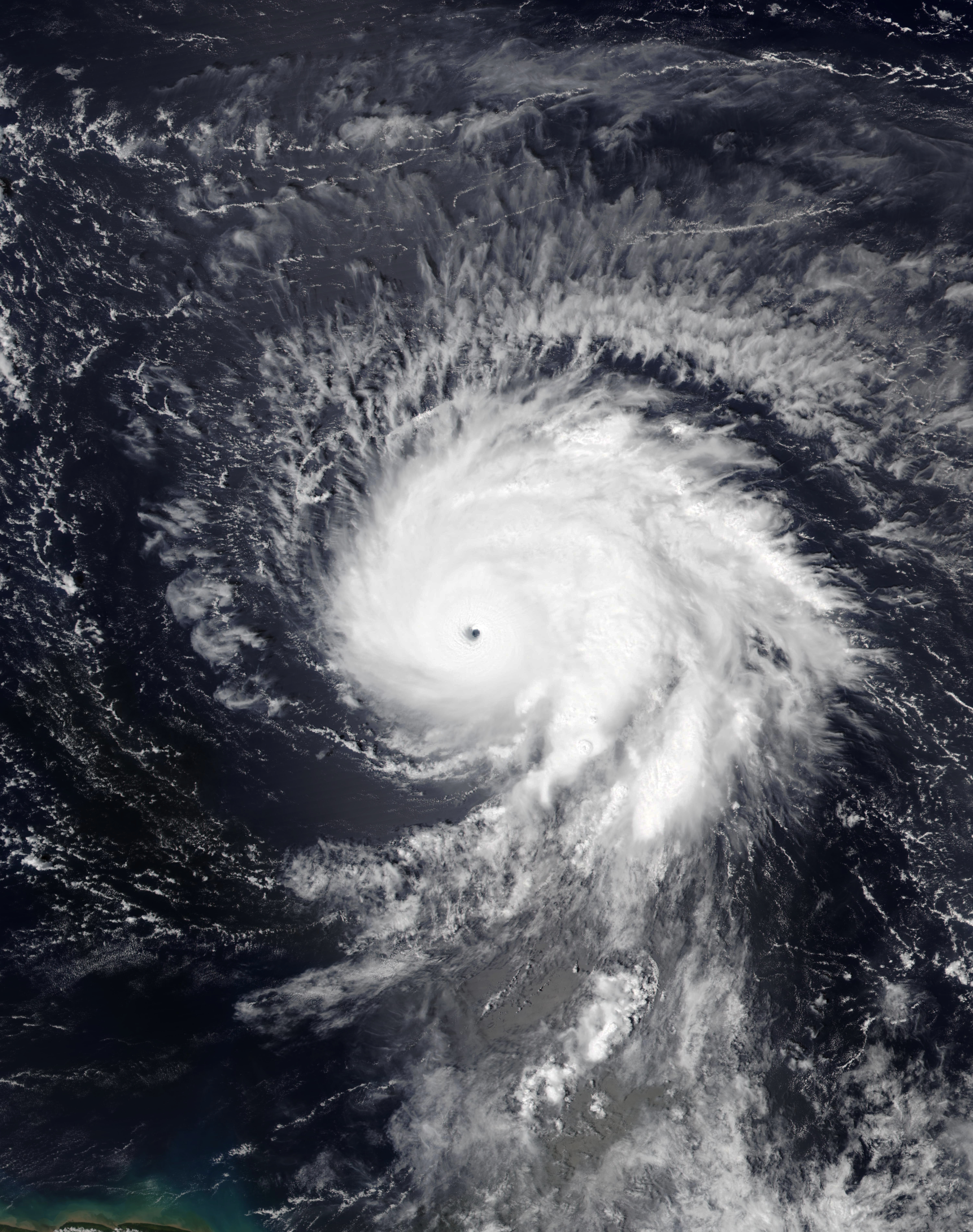
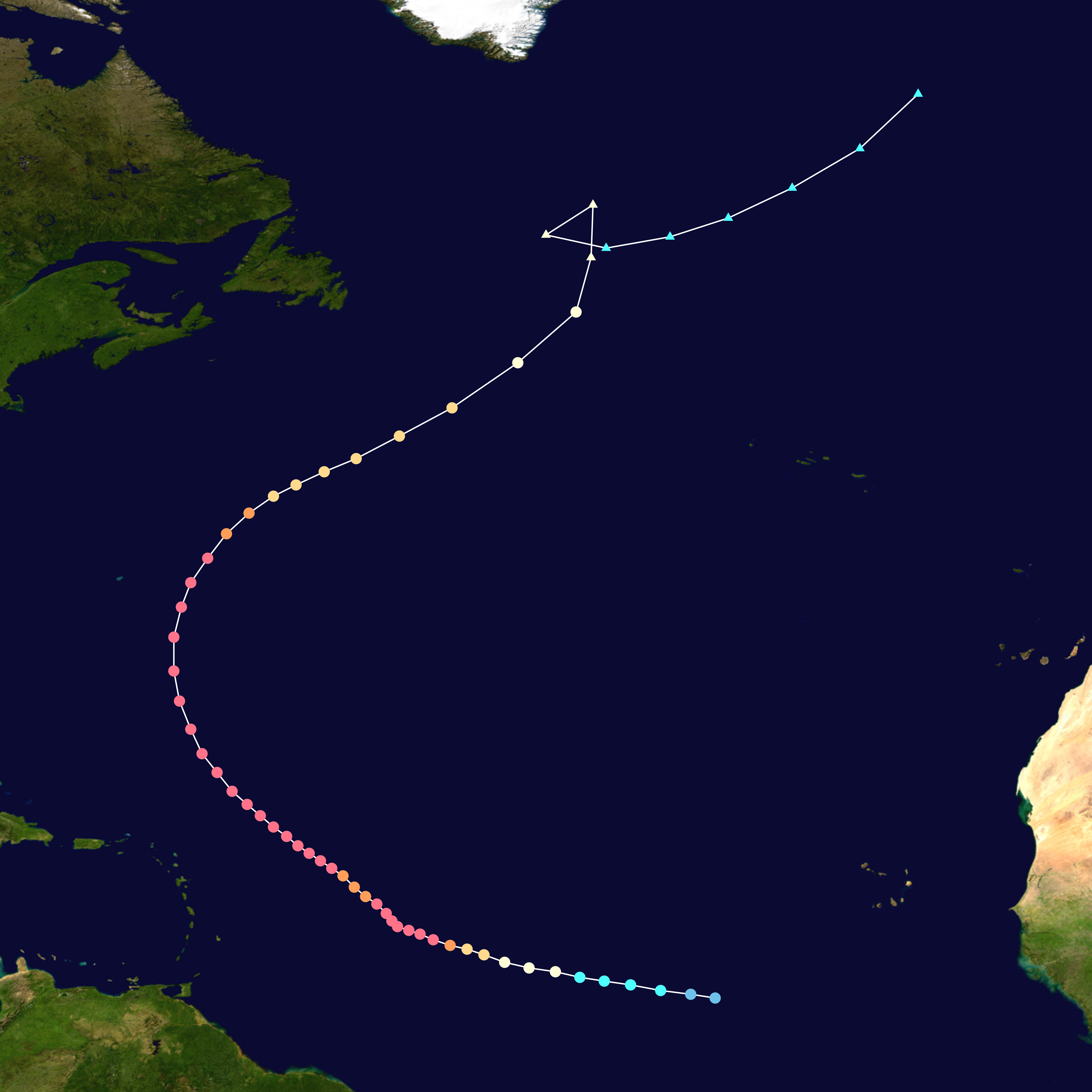
- Duration: September 22 – October 5
- Peak intensity: 155 mph (250 km/h) (1-min); 927 mbar (hPa)

On September 19, a tropical wave moved off the west coast of Africa and into the Atlantic. Late on September 22, a tropical depression formed to the west-southwest of Cabo Verde. The depression intensified into Tropical Storm Sam around 06:00 UTC on September 23, and reached hurricane status 24 hours later. With very low wind shear and warm waters, Sam strengthened further, becoming a Category 4 hurricane late on September 25. The NHC estimated that the cyclone reached its peak intensity around 18:00 UTC on September 26, with maximum sustained winds of 155 mph (250 km/h) and a minimum barometric pressure of 927 mbar (27.4 inHg). Sam briefly weakened to a Category 3 hurricane due to an eyewall replacement cycle and a slight increase in wind shear, before re-strengthening back to a Category 4 hurricane on September 28. It reached its secondary peak on October 1 with sustained winds of 150 mph (240 km/h). Sam accelerated north-northeastward and then northward, passing east of Bermuda on October 2. Around this time, the cyclone gradually began to weaken as it tracked over cooler sea surface temperatures. It was a major hurricane (Category 3 or stronger) for nearly eight consecutive days, the longest continuous stretch at that intensity for an Atlantic hurricane since Ivan, in 2004. Early on October 5, Sam transitioned into an extratropical cyclone well east of Newfoundland. The extratropical low executed a cyclonic loop and was later absorbed by an extratropical low southwest of Iceland early on October 7.

The hurricane brought dangerous swells to the Lesser Antilles and the East Coast of the United States, even though it remained more than 900 mi (1,450 km) offshore the latter. Despite passing well east of Bermuda, Sam produced gale-force winds in the island, although each recording site was elevated above-ground. The National Museum of Bermuda observed a wind gust of 53 mph (85 km/h), with the anemometer 150 ft (46 m) above sea level.

=== Subtropical Storm Teresa ===
- Subtropical storm (SSHWS)
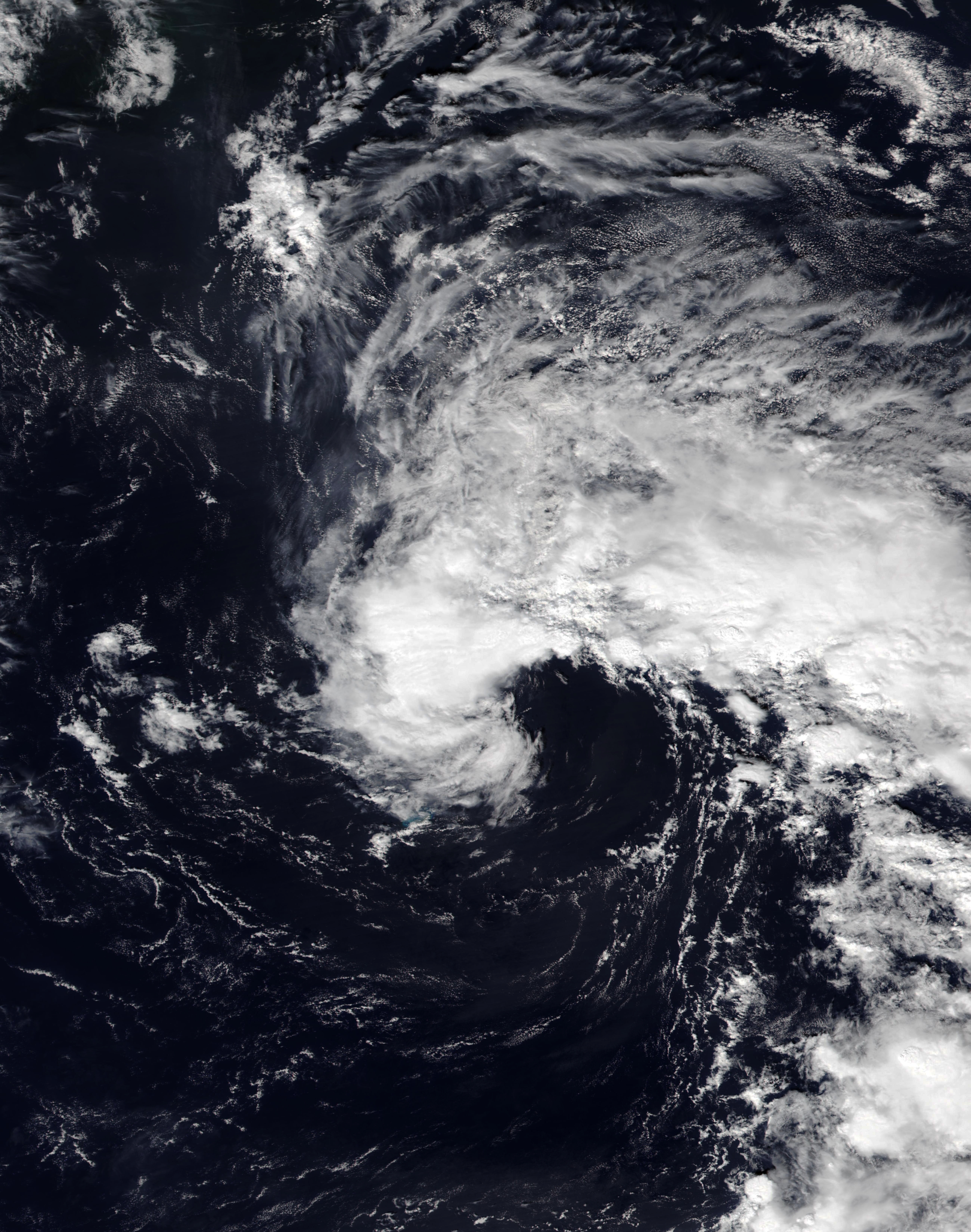
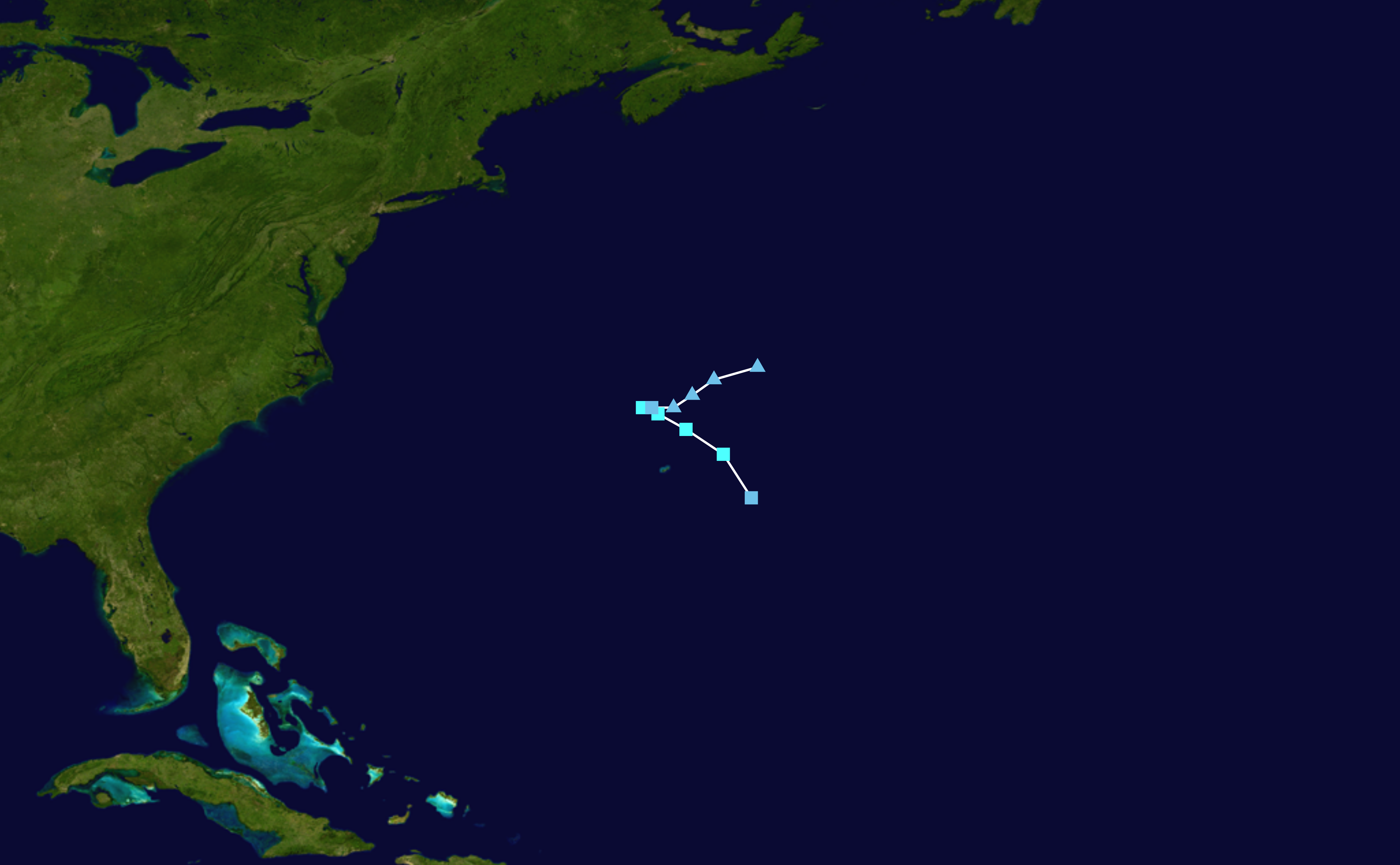
- Duration: September 24 – September 25
- Peak intensity: 45 mph (75 km/h) (1-min); 1008 mbar (hPa)

A weak cold front first began pushing into the western Atlantic on September 19. As this front interacted with an upper-level low moving in from the west, it generated an area of disturbed weather, with increasing convection located near a developing surface center. That disturbance, nestled underneath the upper-level low, developed into a subtropical depression around 06:00 UTC on September 24 while located about 175 mi (280 km) east-southeast of Bermuda. Over the next 12 hours, the depression intensified into Subtropical Storm Teresa and reached peak winds of 45 mph (72 km/h). As the cyclone moved northwest but then veered northeast, it encountered dry air and wind shear promptly causing it to weaken. Teresa degenerated to a remnant low around 18:00 UTC on September 25. The low weakened to a trough the next day, and that trough was absorbed by a frontal system on September 27.

=== Tropical Storm Victor ===
- Tropical storm (SSHWS)
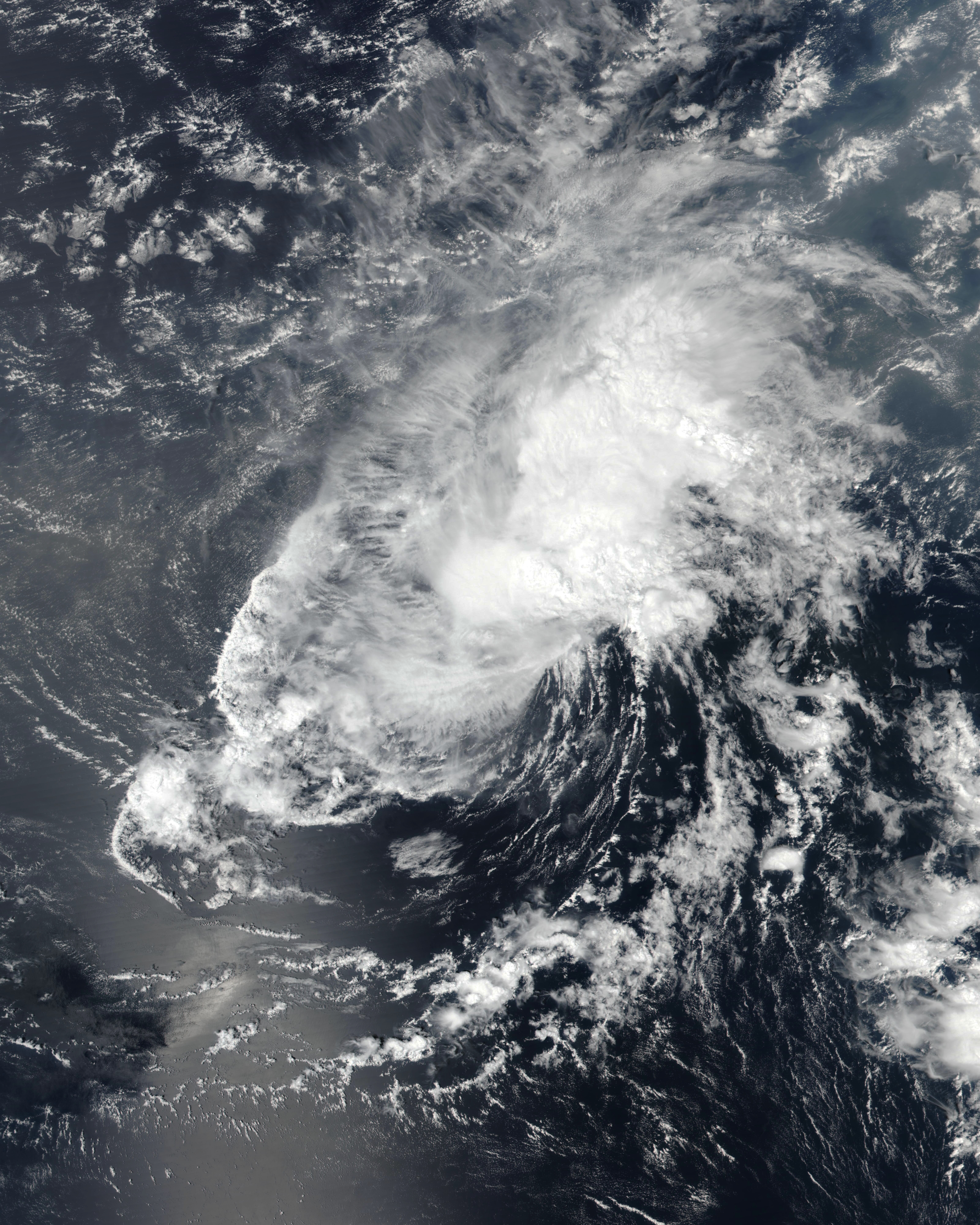
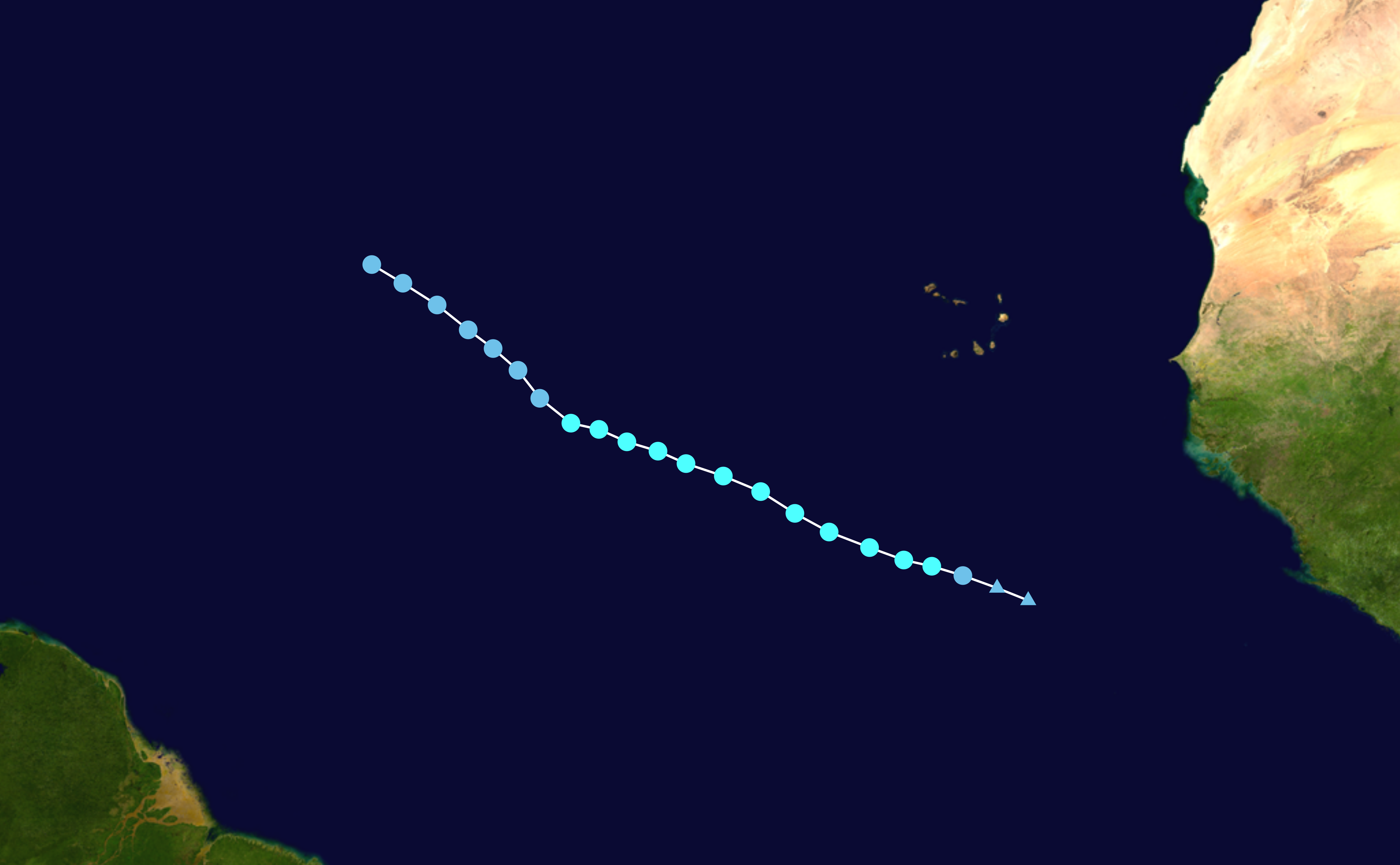
- Duration: September 29 – October 4
- Peak intensity: 65 mph (100 km/h) (1-min); 997 mbar (hPa)

A vigorous tropical wave moved off Africa on September 27 and swiftly organized into a tropical depression around 12:00 UTC on September 29. It developed at an unusually low latitude of 8.1°N, tying Kirk in 2018 and behind only an unnamed 1902 hurricane (7.7°N) for the southernmost location in which an Atlantic system has reached tropical storm intensity. At that time, the system was located about 535 mi (860 km) south of Cabo Verde. The newly formed cyclone moved west-northwest on the south side of a ridge. While ocean temperatures and wind shear values were conducive, the storm was surrounded by some dry air that intermittently became entrained into its circulation. The depression intensified into Tropical Storm Victor at 18:00 UTC on September 29 and reached peak winds of 65 mph (105 km/h) about two days later. As Victor turned northwest, it encountered starkly higher wind shear which resulted in its weakening. Its convection became displaced and its low-level circulation elongated, which led to its degeneration to a trough around 12:00 UTC on October 4. The remnants turned west and dissipated over the open Atlantic the next day.

=== Tropical Storm Wanda ===
- Tropical storm (SSHWS)
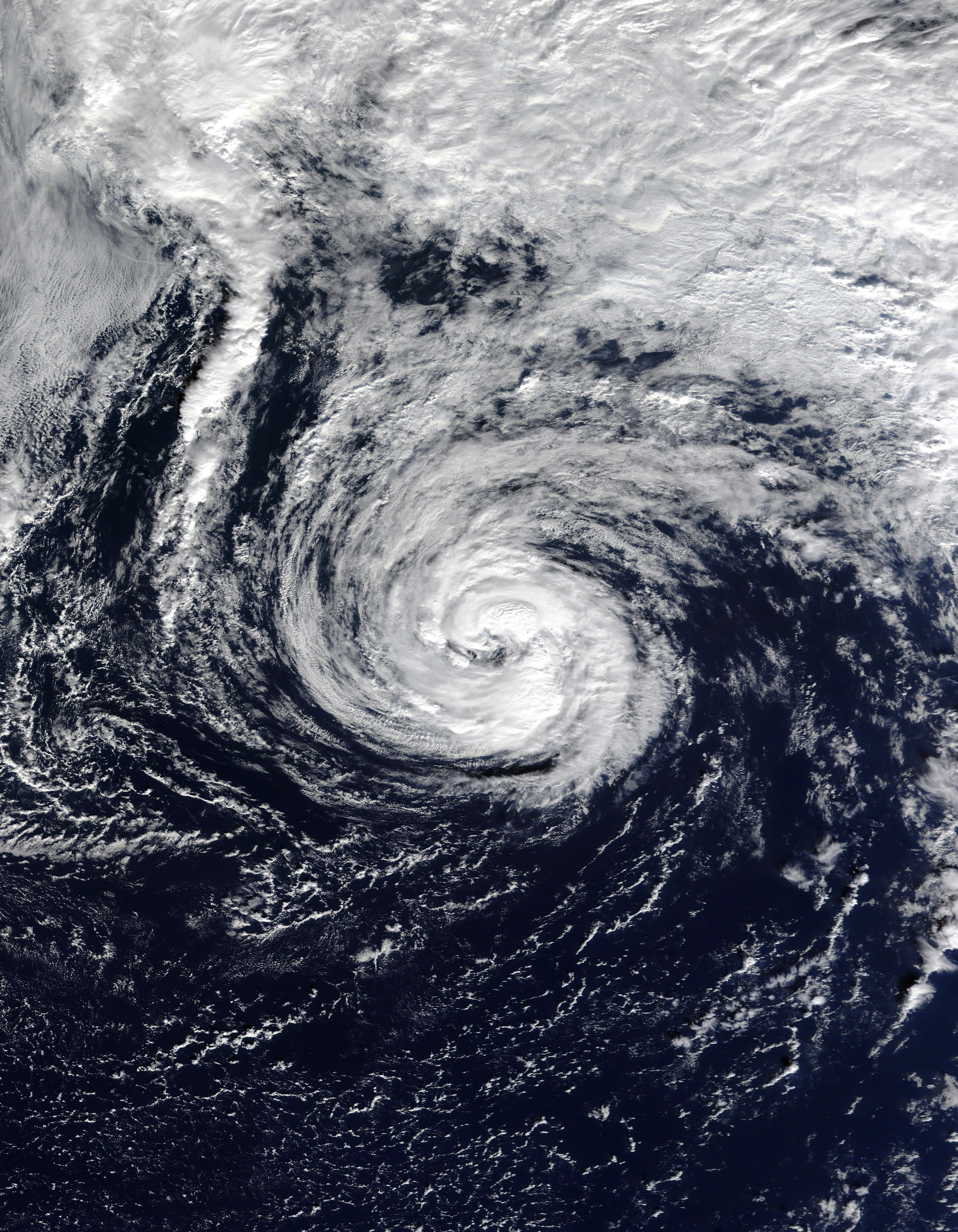
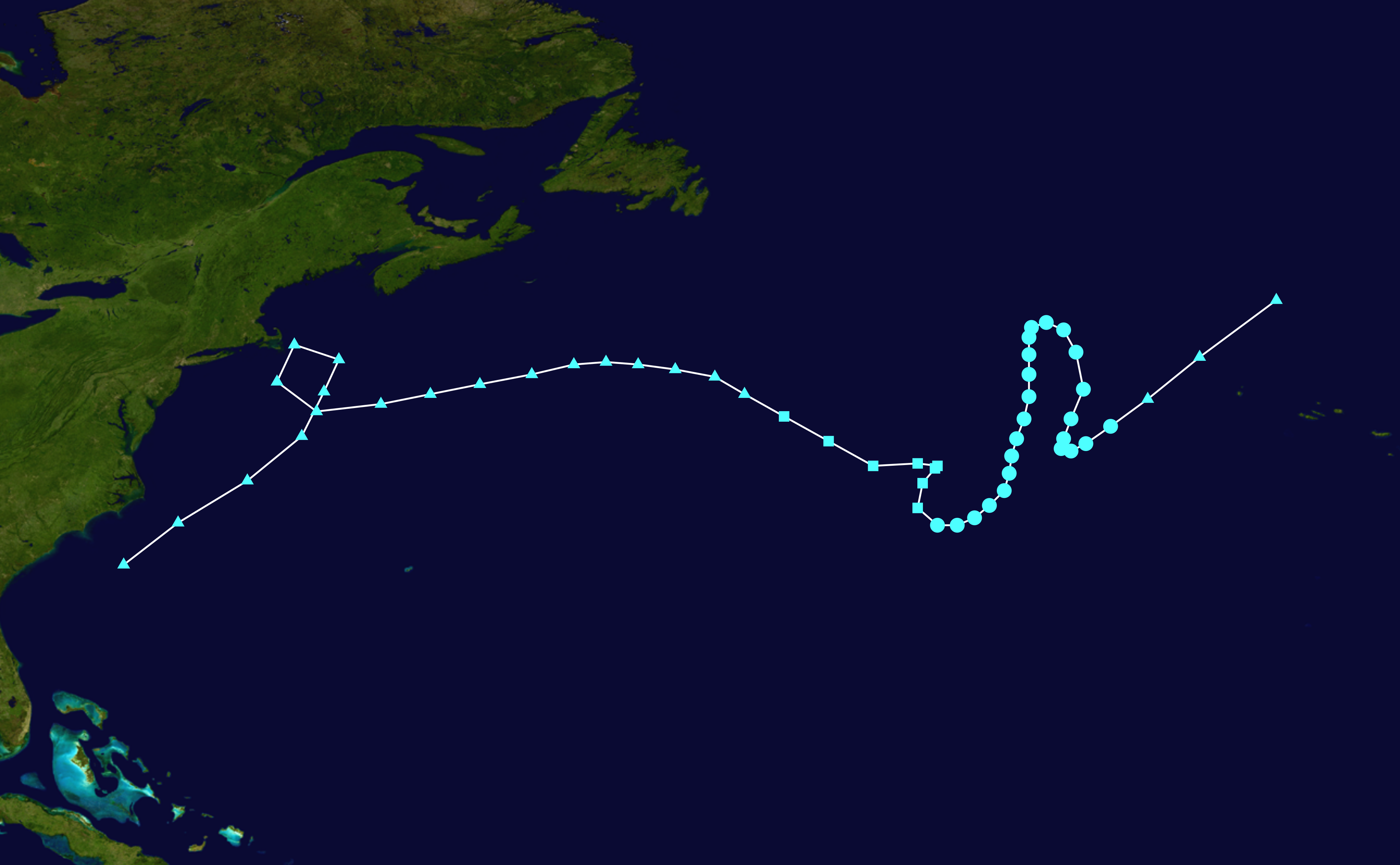
- Duration: October 30 – November 7
- Peak intensity: 60 mph (95 km/h) (1-min); 983 mbar (hPa)

On October 24, the NHC began monitoring a non-tropical disturbance just off the East Coast of the United States, anticipating that it would shortly develop into a strong low-pressure system, a nor'easter, as it moved northward up the coast, and then possibly develop tropical or subtropical characteristics afterward while moving away from the coast. After bringing heavy rainfall, damaging winds, and coastal flooding to areas in the Northeastern United States between October 25 and October 27, the storm acquired subtropical characteristics early on October 31, while located roughly 595 mi (960 km) off Cape Race, Newfoundland, and was given the name Wanda. That same day, Wanda peaked with winds of 60 mph (97 km/h) and a minimum pressure of 983 mbar (29.0 inHg). By 12:00 UTC on November 1, the system transitioned into a tropical storm. After meandering well west of the Azores for several days, Wanda turned southward on November 5 due to a narrow, strengthening ridge to the northwest, before accelerating northeastward late on November 6 as it interacted with a mid-level trough over the northern Atlantic. By November 7, Wanda had lost its deep convection and became a post-tropical low at 12:00 UTC about 430 mi (690 km) west-northwest of the westernmost islands of the Azores, several hours before merging with a frontal system.

The precursor to Wanda caused over $200 million in damages across the Northeastern United States, and two storm-related deaths were reported. Strong winds caused more than 600,000 customers to lose electricity in New England. In coastal Massachusetts, which observed hurricane-force wind gusts, numerous trees fell, damaging homes and vehicles and obstructing many roadways. Flash flooding and localized flooding also impacted several states in the region. Abnormally high tides damaged boats, necessitated water rescues, and caused coastal flooding, especially in Massachusetts and New Jersey.

== Storm names ==
The following list of names was used for named storms that formed in the North Atlantic in 2021. This was the same list used in the 2015 season, with the exceptions of Elsa and Julian, which replaced Erika and Joaquin, respectively. Both new names were used for the first time this year, along with Rose, Sam, Teresa, Victor, and Wanda.

- Ana
- Bill
- Claudette
- Danny
- Elsa
- Fred
- Grace
- Henri
- Ida
- Julian
- Kate
- Larry
- Mindy
- Nicholas
- Odette
- Peter
- Rose
- Sam
- Teresa
- Victor
- Wanda

=== Retirement ===
On April 27, 2022, during the 44th Session of the RA IV Hurricane Committee, the World Meteorological Organization retired the name Ida from its rotating name lists due to the catastrophic damage it caused, and it will not be used again in the North Atlantic basin. Ida was replaced with Imani, which will first appear on the 2027 season list.

== Season effects ==
This is a table of all of the storms that formed in the 2021 Atlantic hurricane season. It includes their name, duration, peak classification and intensities, areas affected, damage, and death totals. Deaths in parentheses are additional and indirect (an example of an indirect death would be a traffic accident), but were still related to that storm. Damage and deaths include totals while the storm was extratropical, a wave, or a low, and all of the damage figures are in 2021 USD.

Saffir–Simpson scale
TD	TS	C1	C2	C3	C4	C5

2021 North Atlantic tropical cyclone season statistics
Storm name	Dates active	Storm category at peak intensity	Max 1-min wind mph (km/h)	Min. press. (mbar)	Areas affected	Damage (US$)	Deaths	Ref(s).
Ana	May 22–23	Tropical storm	45 (75)	1004	Bermuda	None	None	
Bill	June 14–15	Tropical storm	65 (100)	992	East Coast of the United States, Atlantic Canada	None	None	
Claudette	June 19–22	Tropical storm	45 (75)	1003	Southern Mexico, Southern United States, Atlantic Canada	$375 million	4 (10)	
Danny	June 27–29	Tropical storm	45 (75)	1009	Southeastern United States	$5,000	None	
Elsa	June 30 – July 9	Category 1 hurricane	85 (140)	991	Lesser Antilles, Venezuela, Greater Antilles, South Atlantic United States, Northeastern United States, Atlantic Canada	$1.2 billion	13	
Fred	August 11–17	Tropical storm	65 (100)	991	Lesser Antilles, Greater Antilles, The Bahamas, Southeastern United States, Great Lakes region, Northeastern United States, Atlantic Canada	$1.3 billion	6 (1)	
Grace	August 13–21	Category 3 hurricane	120 (195)	967	Lesser Antilles, Greater Antilles, Yucatán Peninsula, Central Mexico	$513 million	16 (1)	
Henri	August 15–23	Category 1 hurricane	75 (120)	986	Bermuda, Northeastern United States, Eastern Canada	$700 million	2	
Ida	August 26 – September 1	Category 4 hurricane	150 (240)	929	Venezuela, Colombia, Greater Antilles, Southern United States, Northeastern United States, Atlantic Canada	≥ $75.25 billion	60 (52)	
Kate	August 28 – September 1	Tropical storm	45 (75)	1004	None	None	None	
Julian	August 28–30	Tropical storm	60 (95)	993	None	None	None	
Larry	August 31 – September 11	Category 3 hurricane	125 (205)	953	Lesser Antilles, Bermuda, East Coast of the United States, Nova Scotia, Newfoundland, Saint Pierre and Miquelon, Greenland	$61 million	5	
Mindy	September 8–9	Tropical storm	60 (95)	1000	Colombia, Central America, Yucatán Peninsula, Florida, Georgia, South Carolina	$75.169 million	0 (23)	
Nicholas	September 12–15	Category 1 hurricane	75 (120)	988	Mexico, Gulf Coast of the United States	$1.1 billion	2 (2)	
Odette	September 17–18	Tropical storm	45 (75)	1005	East Coast of the United States, Atlantic Canada	None	0 (1)	
Peter	September 19–22	Tropical storm	50 (85)	1005	Hispaniola, Leeward Islands, Puerto Rico	$12,000	None	
Rose	September 19–22	Tropical storm	60 (95)	1004	None	None	None	
Sam	September 22 – October 5	Category 4 hurricane	155 (250)	927	West Africa, Leeward Islands, Puerto Rico, Bermuda, Iceland	Minimal	None	
Teresa	September 24–25	Subtropical storm	45 (75)	1008	Bermuda	None	None	
Victor	September 29 – October 4	Tropical storm	65 (100)	997	None	None	None	
Wanda	October 30 – November 7	Tropical storm	60 (95)	983	East Coast of the United States, Atlantic Canada	>$200 million	0 (2)	
Season aggregates
21 systems	May 22 – November 7		155 (230)	927		>$80.78 billion	106 (92)	

== See also ==
- Weather of 2021
- Tropical cyclones in 2021
- 2021 Pacific hurricane season
- 2021 Pacific typhoon season
- 2021 North Indian Ocean cyclone season
- South-West Indian Ocean cyclone seasons: 2020–21, 2021–22
- Australian region cyclone seasons: 2020–21, 2021–22
- South Pacific cyclone seasons: 2020–21, 2021–22
