= Timeline of the 2021 Atlantic hurricane season =

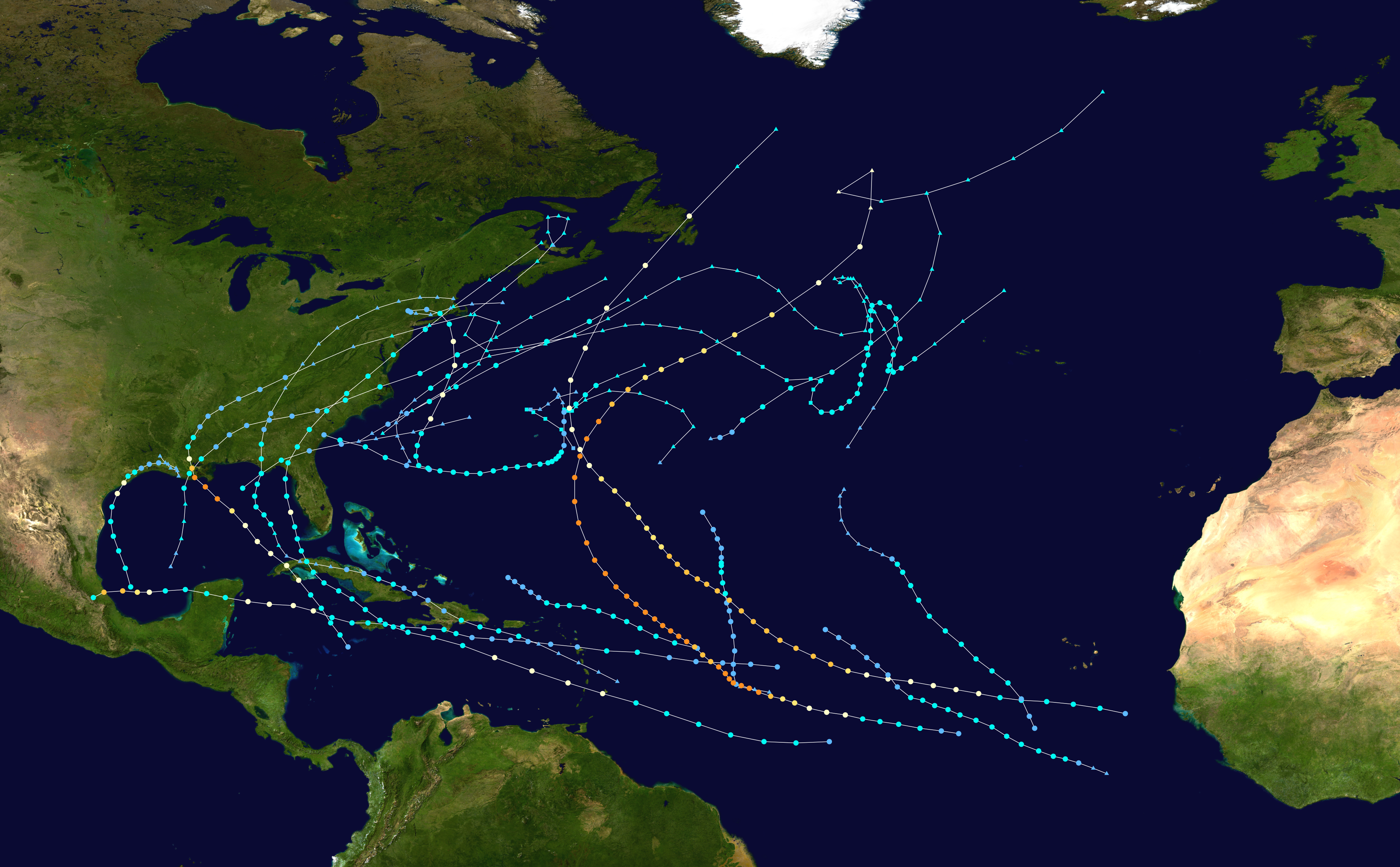
- Season summary map

Season boundaries
- First system formed: May 22, 2021
- Last system dissipated: November 7, 2021

Strongest system
- Name: Sam
- Maximum winds: 155 mph (250 km/h) (1-minute sustained)
- Lowest pressure: 927 mbar (hPa; 27.37 inHg)

Longest lasting system
- Name: Sam
- Duration: 12.5 days
Storm articles
- Tropical Storm Claudette (2021)
- Tropical Storm Danny (2021)
- Hurricane Elsa
- Tropical Storm Fred (2021)
- Hurricane Grace
- Hurricane Henri
- Hurricane Ida
- Hurricane Larry
- Tropical Storm Mindy
- Hurricane Nicholas
- Hurricane Sam

The 2021 Atlantic hurricane season was the third most active Atlantic hurricane season on record with 21 named storms, and the sixth consecutive year in which there was above-average tropical cyclone activity (Note: An average Atlantic hurricane season, as defined by the National Oceanic and Atmospheric Administration, has 12 tropical storms, six hurricanes and two major hurricanes.) The season officially began on June 1, 2021, and ended on November 30, 2021. These dates, adopted by convention, historically describe the period in each year when most Northern Atlantic tropical cyclones form. However, tropical cyclone formation is possible at any time of the year, as was the case this season, when Tropical Storm Ana formed on May 22. The season's final system, Tropical Storm Wanda, dissipated on November 7.

Of the season's 21 named storms, seven became hurricanes, and four further intensified into major hurricanes. (Note: Hurricanes reaching Category 3 (111 miles per hour (179 km/h)) and higher on the 5-level Saffir–Simpson wind speed scale are considered major hurricanes.) The season's most devastating storm was Hurricane Ida. It made landfall in Louisiana with maximum sustained winds of 150 mph (240 km/h), destroying coastal communities in its path.

This timeline documents tropical cyclone formations, strengthening, weakening, landfalls, extratropical transitions, and dissipations during the season. It includes information that was not released throughout the season, meaning that data from post-storm reviews by the National Hurricane Center, such as a storm that was not initially warned upon, has been included.

The time stamp for each event is first stated using Coordinated Universal Time (UTC), the 24-hour clock where 00:00 = midnight UTC. The NHC uses both UTC and the time zone where the center of the tropical cyclone is currently located. The time zones utilized (east to west) are: Greenwich, Cape Verde, Atlantic, Eastern, and Central. In this timeline, the respective area time is included in parentheses. Additionally, figures for maximum sustained winds and position estimates are rounded to the nearest 5 units (miles, or kilometers), following National Hurricane Center practice. Direct wind observations are rounded to the nearest whole number. Atmospheric pressures are listed to the nearest millibar and nearest hundredth of an inch of mercury.

== Timeline ==
=== May ===
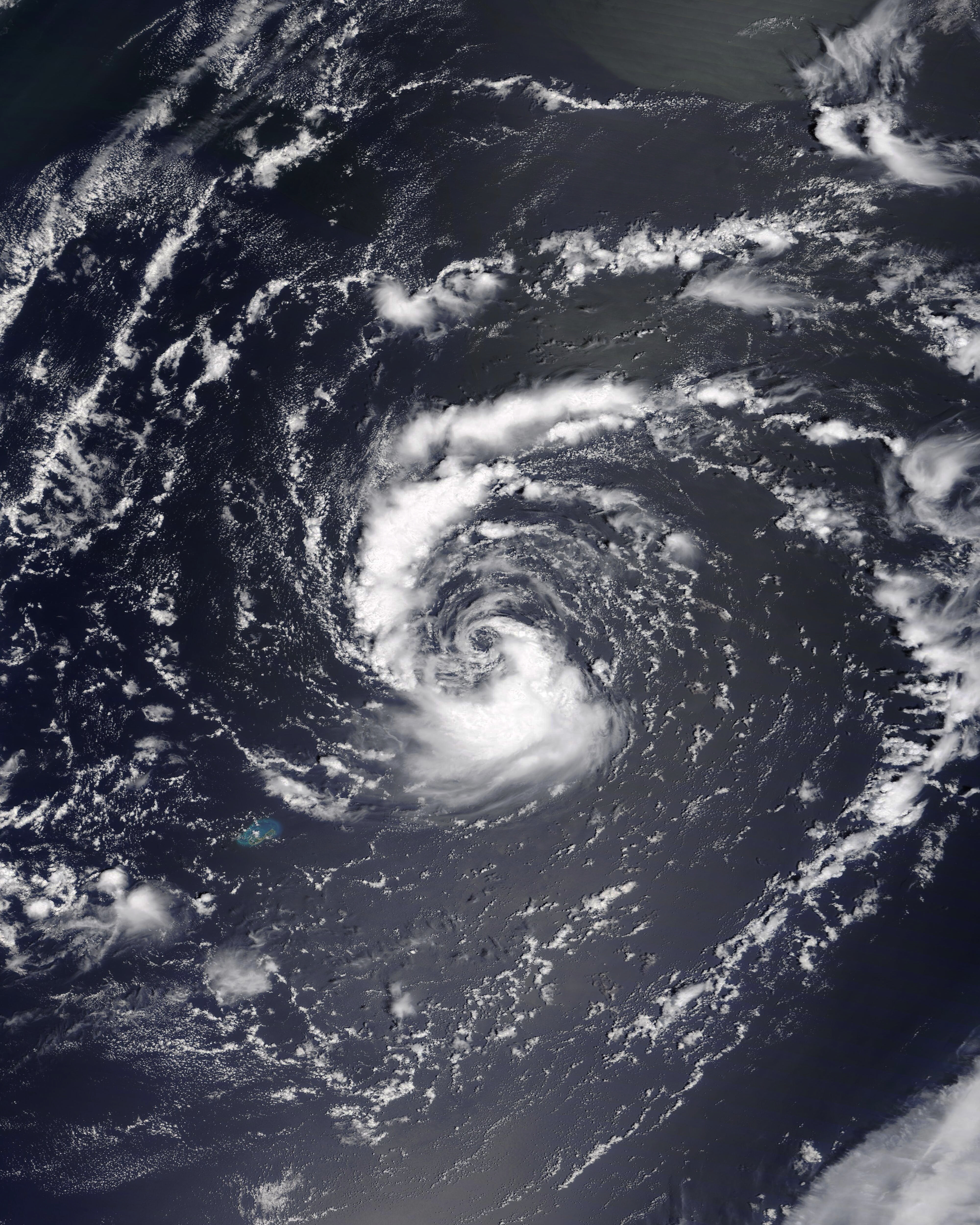
Subtropical Storm Ana northeast of Bermuda on May 22

May 22

- 06:00 UTC (2:00 a.m. AST) at 34.2°N 62.1°W – Subtropical Storm Ana forms from an extratropical cyclone about 200 mi (325 km) northeast of Bermuda.

May 23

- 00:00 UTC (8:00 p.m. AST, May 23) at 34.7°N 61.8°W – Subtropical Storm Ana transitions to a tropical storm about 235 mi (280 km) northeast of Bermuda.
- 06:00 UTC (2:00 a.m. AST) at 35.4°N 61.1°W – Tropical Storm Ana reaches peak intensity with winds of 45 mph (75 km/h) and a minimum central pressure of 1004 mbar (29.65 inHg), about 295 mi (470 km) northeast of Bermuda.
- 18:00 UTC (2:00 p.m. AST) at 36.8°N 58.7°W – Tropical Storm Ana transitions to a post-tropical cyclone about 455 mi (730 km) northeast of Bermuda, and subsequently opens up into a trough.

=== June ===
June 1

- The 2021 Atlantic hurricane season officially begins.

June 14

- 06:00 UTC (2:00 a.m. EDT) at 33.2°N 75.9°W – Tropical Depression Two forms from a stationary front about 125 mi (205 km) east-southeast of Cape Fear, North Carolina.
- 18:00 UTC (2:00 p.m. EDT) at 36.7°N 69.8°W – Tropical Depression Two strengthens into Tropical Storm Bill about 155 mi (250 km) east of Cape Hatteras, North Carolina.

June 15

- 12:00 UTC (8:00 a.m. AST) at 39.4°N 64.0°W – Tropical Storm Bill reaches its peak intensity with maximum sustained winds of 65 mph (100 km/h) and a minimum central pressure of 992 mbar (29.29 inHg), about 345 mi (555 km) east-southeast of Chatham, Massachusetts.

June 16

- 00:00 UTC (8:00 p.m. AST, June 15) at 42.5°N 57.9°W – Tropical Storm Bill transitions into a post-tropical cyclone about 370 mi (595 km) east-southeast of Halifax, Nova Scotia, and later degenerates into a trough of low pressure.

June 19

- 00:00 UTC (7:00 p.m. CDT, June 18) at 28.4°N 91.2°W – Tropical Storm Claudette forms from an area of low pressure about 90 mi (150 km) south of Morgan City, Louisiana. (Note: Due to the threat the developing system posed to the Gulf Coast of the United States, the National Hurricane Center initiated advisories it, designating it Potential Tropical Cyclone Three at 21:00 UTC (4:00 p.m. CDT) on June 17.)
- 04:30 UTC (11:30 p.m. CDT, June 18) at 29.2°N 91.0°W – Tropical Storm Claudette makes landfall in Terrebonne Parish, Louisiana, about 30 mi (45 km) south-southwest of Houma.
- 06:00 UTC (1:00 a.m. CDT) at 29.5°N 90.8°W – Tropical Storm Claudette reaches its peak intensity with maximum sustained winds of 45 mph (75 km/h) and a minimum central pressure of 1003 mbar (29.62 inHg), about 10 mi (15 km) south-southwest of Houma.
- 18:00 UTC (1:00 p.m. CDT) at 31.5°N 88.8°W – Tropical Storm Claudette weakens into a tropical depression over eastern Alabama, about 175 mi (280 km) northeast of Houma.

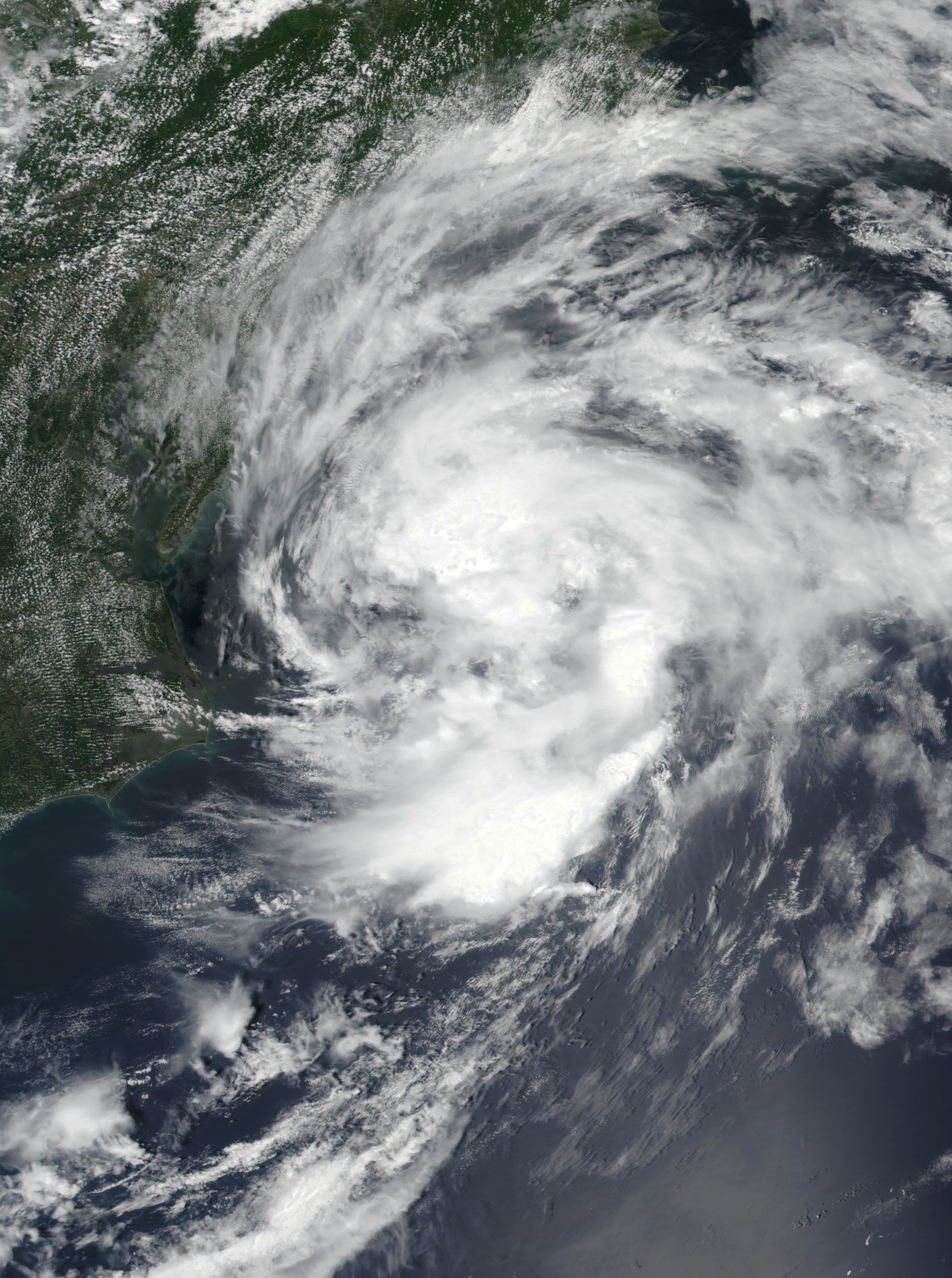
Tropical Storm Claudette off the coast of North Carolina on June 21

June 21

- 06:00 UTC (2:00 a.m. EDT) at 35.0°N 79.1°W – Tropical Depression Claudette re-strengthens into a tropical storm just off the North Carolina coast.

June 22

- 06:00 UTC (2:00 a.m. AST) at 39.7°N 67.8°W – Tropical Storm Claudette transitions to an extratropical low, and subsequently dissipates southeast of the coast of Nova Scotia.

June 27

- 18:00 UTC (2:00 p.m. EDT) at 29.8°N 72.8°W – Tropical Depression Four forms from a non-tropical low about 460 mi (740 km) east-southeast of Charleston, South Carolina.

June 28

- 06:00 UTC (2:00 a.m. EDT) at 30.7°N 76.1°W – Tropical Depression Four strengthens into Tropical Storm Danny about 260 mi (415 km) southeast of Charleston.
- 18:00 UTC (2:00 p.m. EDT) at 32.0°N 79.5°W – Tropical Storm Danny reaches peak intensity with winds of 45 mph (75 km/h) and a minimum central pressure of 1,009 mbar (29.8 inHg), about 50 mi (85 km) south-southeast of Charleston.
- 23:20 UTC (7:20 p.m. EDT) at 32.3°N 80.5°W – Tropical Storm Danny makes landfall on Pritchards Island, north of Hilton Head, South Carolina, with sustained winds of 40 mph (65 km/h).

June 29

- 00:00 UTC (8:00 p.m. EDT, June 28) at 32.4°N 80.7°W – Tropical Storm Danny weakens into a tropical depression inland over eastern South Carolina, and later dissipates over eastern Georgia.

June 30

- 18:00 UTC (2:00 p.m. AST) at 9.4°N 42.8°W – Tropical Depression Five forms from a tropical wave about 1,150 mi (1,850 km) east-southeast of Barbados. (Note: Due to the threat the developing system posed to the countries and territories in the Lesser Antilles, the National Hurricane Center initiated advisories it, designating it Potential Tropical Cyclone Five at 21:00 UTC (5:00 p.m. AST) on June 30.)

=== July ===
July 1

- 00:00 UTC (8:00 p.m. AST, June 30) at 9.3°N 45.3°W – Tropical Depression Five strengthens into Tropical Storm Elsa about 980 mi (1,575 km) east-southeast of Barbados.

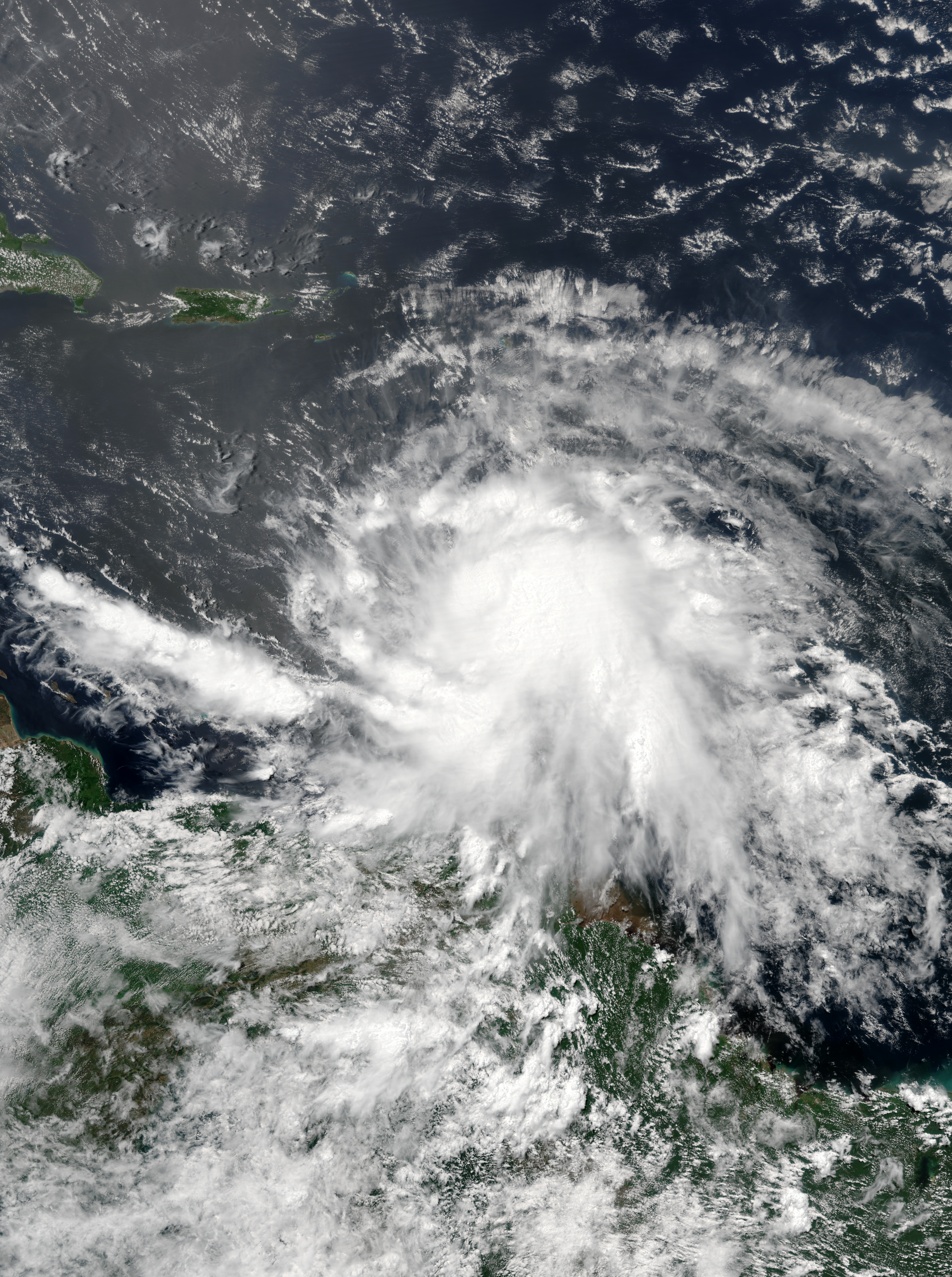
Hurricane Elsa after passing through the Lesser Antilles on July 2

July 2

- 12:00 UTC (8:00 a.m. AST) at 13.0°N 59.8°W – Tropical Storm Elsa strengthens into a Category 1 hurricane about 20 mi (30 km) south of Barbados.
- 18:00 UTC (2:00 p.m. AST) at 13.8°N 62.4°W – Hurricane Elsa reaches peak intensity with winds of 85 mph (140 km/h) and a minimum central pressure of 991 mbar (29.3 inHg), about 95 mi (155 km) west-northwest of Saint Vincent.

July 3

- 12:00 UTC (8:00 a.m. AST) at 16.6°N 70.3°W – Hurricane Elsa weakens into a tropical storm about 115 mi (185 km) south of the southern coast of the Dominican Republic.

July 5

- 18:00 UTC (2:00 p.m. AST) at 22.2°N 81.6°W – Tropical Storm Elsa makes landfall on the south coast of Cuba in Cienaga de Zapata National Park with maximum winds of about 65 mph (100 km/h).

July 7

- 00:00 UTC (8:00 p.m. EDT, July 6) at 26.6°N 83.2°W – Tropical Storm Elsa re-strengthens into a Category 1 hurricane about 50 mi (80 km) west of Englewood, Florida.
- 06:00 UTC (2:00 a.m. EDT) at 27.8°N 83.5°W – Hurricane Elsa weakens again into a tropical storm about 35 mi (55 km) west of St. Petersburg, Florida.
- 14:30 UTC (10:30 a.m. EDT) at 29.8°N 83.5°W – Tropical Storm Elsa makes landfall in Taylor County, Florida with maximum winds of about 65 mph (100 km/h).

July 9

- 15:00 UTC (11:00 a.m. EDT) at 40.9°N 72.3°W – Tropical Storm Elsa makes landfall near East Hampton, New York with maximum winds of about 60 mph (95 km/h).
- 16:30 UTC (12:30 p.m. EDT) at 41.4°N 71.7°W – Tropical Storm Elsa makes landfall near Westerly, Rhode Island with maximum winds of about 60 mph (95 km/h).
- 18:00 UTC (2:00 p.m. EDT) at 42.0°N 71.0°W – Tropical Storm Elsa transitions into an extratropical cyclone over southeastern New England, and later dissipates.

=== August ===
August 11

- 00:00 UTC (8:00 p.m. AST, August 10) at 17.3°N 66.1°W – Tropical Storm Fred forms as the result of interaction between a series of tropical waves about 60 mi (95 km) south-southeast of Ponce, Puerto Rico. (Note: Due to the threat the developing system posed to the countries and territories in the Lesser Antilles, the National Hurricane Center initiated advisories it, designating it Potential Tropical Cyclone Six at 21:00 UTC (5:00 p.m. AST) on August 9.)
- 17:00 UTC (1:00 p.m. AST) at 18.4°N 70.1°W – Tropical Storm Fred makes landfall near San Cristóbal, Dominican Republic, with maximum sustained winds of 45 mph (75 km/h).

August 12

- 00:00 UTC (8:00 p.m. EDT, August 11) at 19.2°N 71.7°W – Tropical Storm Fred weakens to a tropical depression over central Hispaniola, 50 mi (85 km) southeast of Cap-Haïtien, Haiti.

August 13

- 00:00 UTC (8:00 p.m. EDT, August 12) at 21.2°N 75.5°W – Tropical Depression Fred re-strengthens to a tropical storm about 60 mi (95 km) east-northeast of Holguín, Cuba.
- 06:00 UTC (2:00 p.m. AST) at 15.0°N 46.7°W – Tropical Depression Seven forms from a tropical wave about 1,015 mi (1,630 km) east of the Leeward Islands. (Note: Due to the threat the developing system posed to the countries and territories in the Leeward Islands, the National Hurricane Center initiated advisories on it, designating it Potential Tropical Cyclone Seven at 15:00 UTC (11:00 a.m. AST) on August 12.)
- 12:00 UTC (8:00 a.m. EDT) at 22.0°N 77.7°W – Tropical Storm Fred again weakens into a tropical depression as it simultaneously makes landfall on Cayo Romano, on the northern coast of Cuba.

August 14

- 00:00 UTC (8:00 a.m. EDT, August 13) at 22.5°N 80.2°W – Tropical Depression Fred degenerates into an open trough over central Cuba.
- 12:00 UTC (8:00 a.m. AST) at 16.1°N 57.2°W – Tropical Depression Seven strengthens into Tropical Storm Grace about 310 mi (500 km) east-southeast of the Leeward Islands.

August 15

- 00:00 UTC (8:00 p.m. AST, August 14) at 16.5°N 61.7°W – Tropical Storm Grace weakens into a tropical depression about 35 mi (55 km) north of Guadeloupe.
- 12:00 UTC (8:00 a.m. EDT) at 25.7°N 84.7°W – Remnants of Fred re-develop into a tropical storm about 185 mi (295 km) west of Naples, Florida.
- 18:00 UTC (2:00 p.m. AST) at 34.1°N 62.7°W – Tropical Depression Eight forms from a surface low pressure system about 175 mi (280 km) northeast of Bermuda.

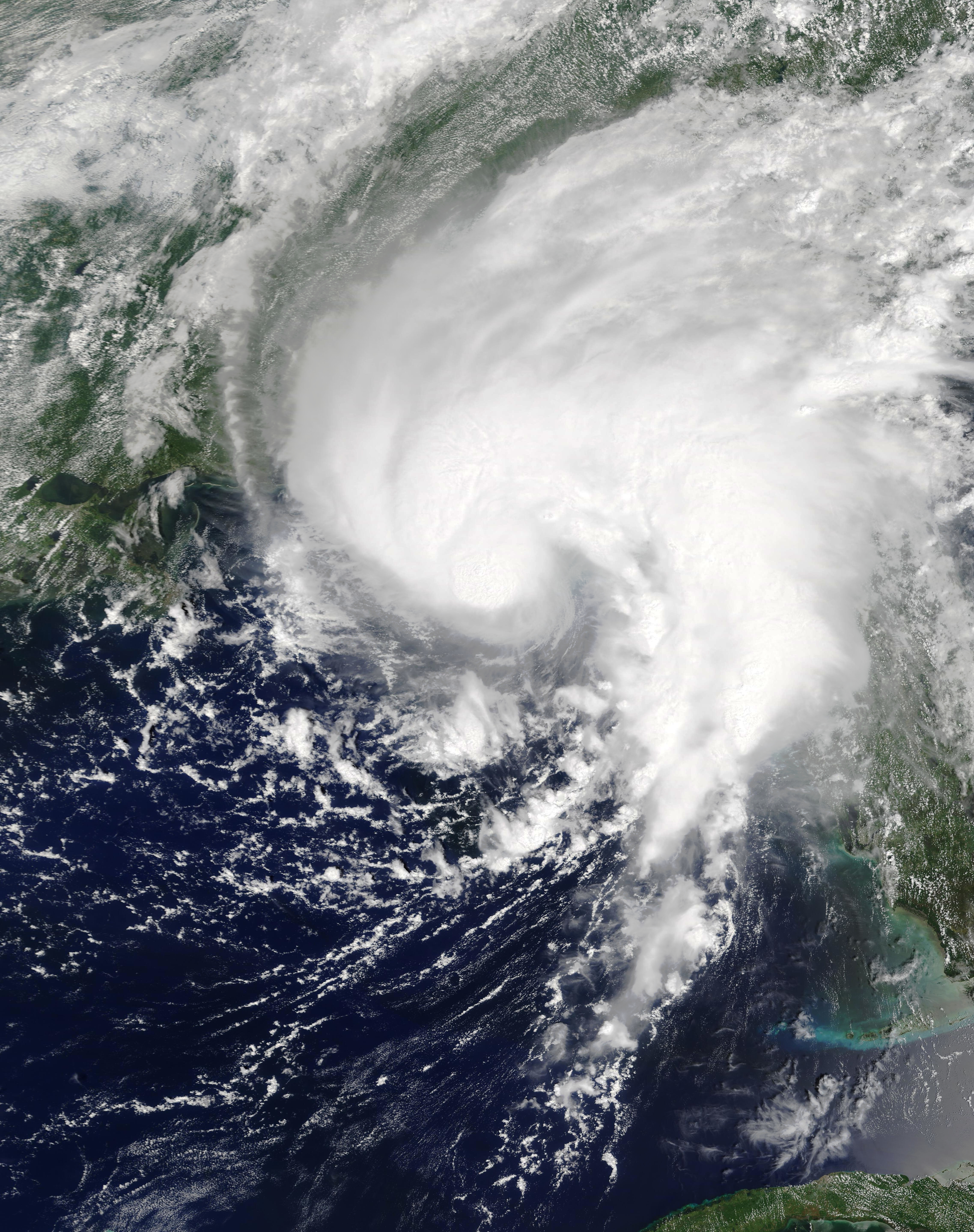
Tropical Storm Fred approaching the Florida Panhandle on August 16

August 16

- 12:00 UTC (8:00 a.m. AST) at 17.5°N 71.4°W – Tropical Depression Grace re-strengthens into a tropical storm about 45 mi (75 km) east of Beata Island, Dominican Republic.
- 16:30 UTC (12:30 p.m. AST) at 17.7°N 71.4°W – Tropical Storm Grace makes landfall just south of Oviedo, Dominican Republic, with sustained winds of 40 mph (65 km/h).
- 18:00 UTC (1:00 p.m. CDT) at 29.5°N 85.4°W – Tropical Storm Fred reaches peak intensity with maximum sustained winds of 65 mph (100 km/h) and a minimum central pressure of 991 mbar (29.26 inHg), about 30 mi (45 km) southwest of Apalachicola, Florida.
- 18:00 UTC (2:00 p.m. AST) at 31.1°N 62.9°W – Tropical Depression Eight strengthens into Tropical Storm Henri 125 mi (205 km) southeast of Bermuda.
- 19:00 UTC (2:00 p.m. CDT) at 29.7°N 85.4°W – Tropical Storm Fred makes landfall at peak intensity on the St. Joseph Peninsula, just northwest of Cape San Blas, in the Florida Panhandle.

August 17

- 12:00 UTC (8:00 a.m. EDT) at 32.8°N 85.2°W – Tropical Storm Fred weakens to a tropical depression over eastern Alabama.
- 14:00 UTC (10:00 a.m. EDT) at 18.2°N 76.6°W – Tropical Storm Grace makes landfall on the northeastern coast of Jamaica near Black Hill, with sustained winds of 60 mph (95 km/h).

August 18

- 00:00 UTC (8:00 p.m. EDT, August 17) at 35.9°N 83.6°W – Tropical Storm Fred becomes a post-tropical low over eastern Tennessee.
- 12:00 UTC (8:00 a.m. EDT) at 19.2°N 81.5°W – Tropical Storm Grace strengthens into a Category 1 hurricane about 15 mi (30 km) west-southwest of Grand Cayman.

August 19

- 00:00 UTC (8:00 p.m. EDT, August 18) at 41.2°N 78.2°W – Post-Tropical Cyclone Fred becomes an extratropical low over central Pennsylvania, and subsequently dissipates.
- 09:45 UTC (4:45 a.m. CDT) at 20.1°N 87.5°W – Hurricane Grace makes landfall about 10 mi (15 km) south of Tulum, Quintana Roo, with sustained winds of 85 mph (140 km/h).
- 12:00 UTC (7:00 a.m. CDT) at 20.2°N 88.1°W – Hurricane Grace weakens into a tropical storm inland over the Yucatán Peninsula.

Satellite loop of Hurricane Grace rapidly intensifying in the Bay of Campeche on August 20

August 20

- 12:00 UTC (7:00 a.m. CDT) at 20.6°N 93.8°W – Tropical Storm Grace re-strengthens into a Category 1 hurricane about 235 mi (380 km) east-southeast of Tuxpan, Veracruz.
- 18:00 UTC (1:00 p.m. CDT) at 20.6°N 94.7°W – Hurricane Grace intensifies to Category 2 strength about 180 mi (285 km) east-southeast of Tuxpan.

August 21

- 00:00 UTC (7:00 p.m. CDT, August 20) at 20.7°N 95.8°W – Hurricane Grace intensifies to Category 3 strength about 105 mi (165 km) east of Tuxpan, and simultaneously reaches peak intensity with winds of 120 mph (195 km/h) and a minimum central pressure of 967 mbar (28.6 inHg).
- 05:30 UTC (12:30 a.m. CDT) at 20.6°N 97.1°W – Hurricane Grace makes landfall near Tecolutla, Veracruz, at peak intensity.
- 12:00 UTC (7:00 a.m. CDT) at 20.2°N 98.0°W – Hurricane Grace weakens to a tropical storm about 70 mi (110 km) southwest of Tuxpan, and the surface circulation later dissipates. (Note: The mid-level remnants of Grace emerged offshore of the Pacific coast of southwestern Mexico, where they contributed to the formation of Tropical Storm Marty on August 23.)
- 12:00 UTC (8:00 a.m. EDT) at 33.6°N 72.7°W – Tropical Storm Henri strengthens into a Category 1 hurricane about 195 mi (315 km) southeast of Cape Hatteras, North Carolina.

August 22

- 06:00 UTC (2:00 a.m. EDT) at 39.4°N 71.0°W – Hurricane Henri reaches peak intensity with maximum sustained winds of 75 mph (120 km/h) and a minimum central pressure of 986 mbar (29.12 inHg), about 130 mi (205 km) south-southeast of Block Island, Rhode Island.
- 12:00 UTC (8:00 a.m. EDT) at 40.7°N 71.3°W – Hurricane Henri weakens into a tropical storm, about 40 mi (60 km) south-southeast of Block Island.
- 15:20 UTC (11:20 a.m. EDT) at 41.2°N 71.6°W – Tropical Storm Henri makes landfall on Block Island with sustained winds of 65 mph (100 km/h).
- 16:15 UTC (12:15 p.m. EDT) at 41.3°N 71.8°W – Tropical Storm Henri makes landfall near Westerly, Rhode Island with sustained winds of 65 mph (100 km/h).

August 23

- 00:00 UTC (8:00 p.m. EDT, August 22) at 41.8°N 73.0°W – Tropical Storm Henri weakens into a tropical depression about 70 mi (115 km) northwest of Westerly.
- 18:00 UTC (2:00 p.m. EDT) at 41.5°N 73.8°W – Tropical Depression Henri degenerates into a remnant low about 105 mi (170 km) northwest of Westerly, and subsequently dissipates.

August 26

- 15:00 UTC (11:00 a.m. EDT) at 16.9°N 79.2°W – Tropical Depression Nine forms from a combination of multiple low-latitude weather systems, starting with a tropical wave, about 175 mi (280 km) southwest of Kingston, Jamaica.
- 18:00 UTC (6:00 p.m. EDT) at 17.4°N 79.5°W – Tropical Depression Nine strengthens into Tropical Storm Ida about 195 mi (315 km) west of Kingston.

August 27

- 18:00 UTC (2:00 p.m. EDT) at 21.5°N 82.6°W – Tropical Storm Ida strengthens into a Category 1 hurricane as it makes landfall on Isla de la Juventud, Cuba.
- 23:25 UTC (7:25 p.m. EDT) at 22.4°N 83.2°W – Hurricane Ida makes landfall near Playa Dayaniguas, in Pinar del Río Province, Cuba, with sustained winds of 80 mph (130 km/h).

August 28

- 06:00 UTC (2:00 a.m. AST) at 13.7°N 49.8°W – Tropical Depression Ten forms from a tropical wave about 805 mi (1,295 km) east of the Leeward Islands.
- 18:00 UTC (2:00 p.m. AST) at 32.2°N 51.0°W – Tropical Depression Eleven forms from a tropical wave about 805 mi (1,295 km) east of Bermuda.

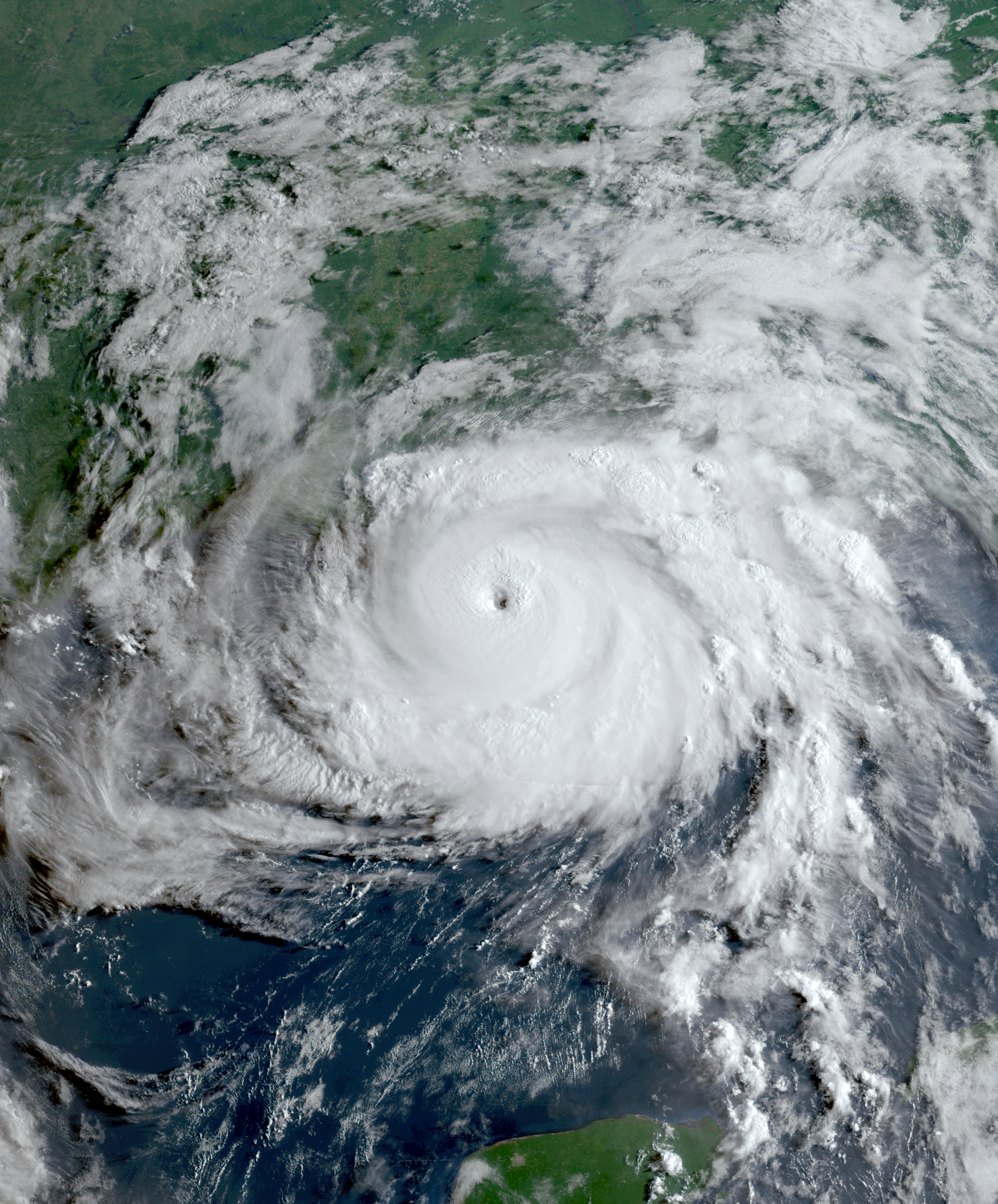
Hurricane Ida approaching Louisiana on August 29

August 29

- 00:00 UTC (7:00 p.m. CDT, August 28) at 26.7°N 87.6°W – Hurricane Ida intensifies to Category 2 strength about 290 mi (465 km) southeast of Houma, Louisiana.
- 06:00 UTC (1:00 a.m. CDT) at 27.6°N 88.7°W – Hurricane Ida intensifies to Category 4 strength about 185 mi (295 km) southeast of Houma.
- 06:00 UTC (2:00 a.m. AST) at 33.5°N 49.3°W – Tropical Depression Eleven strengthens into Tropical Storm Julian about 890 mi (1,435 km) east of Bermuda.
- 12:00 UTC (7:00 a.m. CDT) at 28.5°N 89.6°W – Hurricane Ida reaches peak intensity with maximum sustained winds of 150 mph (240 km/h) and a minimum central pressure of 929 mbar (27.43 inHg), about 50 mi (85 km) southwest of the mouth of the Mississippi River.
- 16:55 UTC (11:55 a.m. CDT) at 29.1°N 90.2°W – Hurricane Ida makes landfall at Port Fourchon, Louisiana, with sustained winds of 150 mph (240 km/h).

August 30

- 00:00 UTC (7:00 p.m. CDT, August 29) at 29.9°N 90.6°W – Hurricane Ida weakens to Category 2 strength inland, about 25 mi (35 km) west-southwest of New Orleans, Louisiana.
- 06:00 UTC (1:00 a.m. CDT) at 30.6°N 90.8°W – Hurricane Ida weakens to Category 1 strength about 20 mi (30 km) south-southwest of Greensburg, Louisiana.
- 06:00 UTC (6:00 a.m. GMT) at 38.9°N 40.0°W – Tropical Storm Julian reaches peak intensity with maximum sustained winds of 60 mph (95 km/h) and a minimum central pressure of 993 mbar (29.3 inHg).
- 06:00 UTC (2:00 a.m. AST) at 20.5°N 50.6°W – Tropical Depression Ten strengthens into Tropical Storm Kate.
- 12:00 UTC (7:00 a.m. CDT) at 31.5°N 90.9°W – Hurricane Ida weakens into a tropical storm about 65 mi (100 km) south-southwest of Jackson, Mississippi.
- 12:00 UTC (12:00 a.m. GMT) at 40.6°N 37.9°W – Tropical Storm Julian completes extratropical transition and merges with a frontal system about 865 mi (1,390 km) east-southeast of Cape Race, Newfoundland.
- 12:00 UTC (8:00 a.m. AST) at 21.3°N 50.8°W – Tropical Storm Kate reaches peak intensity with maximum sustained winds of 45 mph (75 km/h) and a minimum central pressure of 1,004 mbar (29.6 inHg), about 770 mi (1,240 km) east-northeast of the Leeward Islands.

August 31

- 00:00 UTC (7:00 p.m. CDT, August 30) at 33.0°N 90.0°W – Tropical Storm Ida weakens into a tropical depression about 45 mi (75 km) north of Jackson.
- 12:00 UTC (8:00 a.m. AST) at 23.2°N 50.9°W – Tropical Storm Kate weakens into a tropical depression.
- 18:00 UTC (5:00 p.m. CVT) at 11.5°N 20.6°W – Tropical Depression Twelve forms from a tropical wave about 320 mi (520 km) south-southeast of the Cabo Verde Islands.

=== September ===
September 1

- 00:00 UTC (11:00 p.m. CVT, August 31) at 11.9°N 22.5°W – Tropical Depression Twelve strengthens into Tropical Storm Larry about 230 mi (370 km) south-southeast of the Cabo Verde Islands.
- 12:00 UTC (8:00 a.m. EDT) at 37.7°N 81.5°W – Tropical Depression Ida transitions into an extratropical low over southern West Virginia, and subsequently degenerates to a trough.
- 12:00 UTC (8:00 a.m. AST) at 26.6°N 52.3°W – Tropical Depression Kate degenerates into an elongated trough about 960 mi (1,545 km) northeast of the northern Leeward Islands, and subsequently dissipates.

September 2

- 06:00 UTC (2:00 a.m. AST) at 13.0°N 31.6°W – Tropical Storm Larry strengthens into a Category 1 hurricane about 490 mi (785 km) west-southwest of the westernmost Cabo Verde Islands.

September 3

- 18:00 UTC (2:00 p.m. AST) at 14.7°N 41.4°W – Hurricane Larry intensifies to Category 2 strength about 1,215 mi (1,955 km) east of the Leeward Islands.

September 4

- 00:00 UTC (8:00 p.m. AST, September 3) at 16.3°N 44.6°W – Hurricane Larry intensifies to Category 3 strength about 1,130 mi (1,815 km) east of the Leeward Islands.

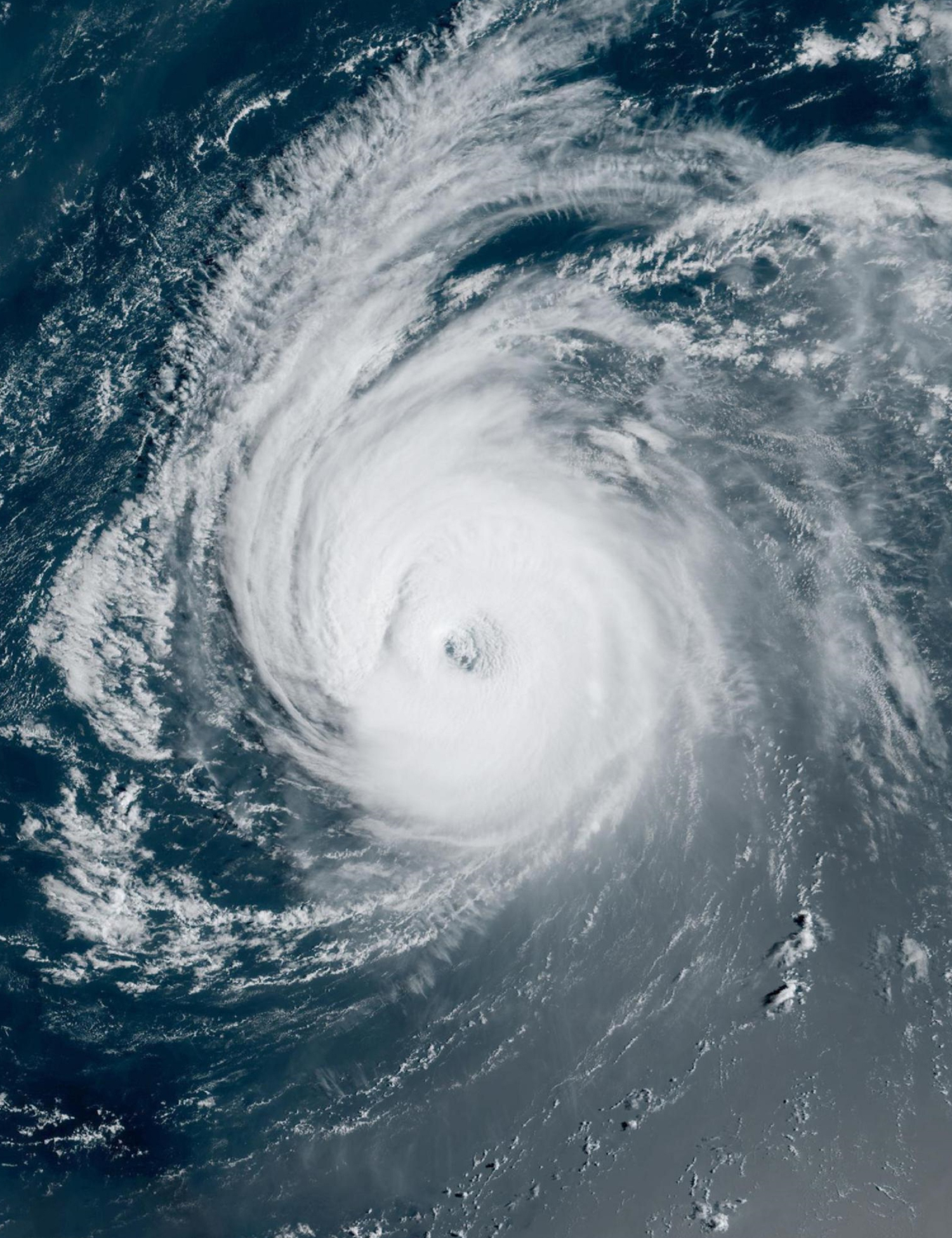
Hurricane Larry in the open Atlantic Ocean on September 5

September 5

- 12:00 UTC (8:00 a.m. AST) at 19.2°N 49.4°W Hurricane Larry reaches peak intensity with winds of 125 mph (205 km/h) and a minimum central pressure of 953 mbar (28.1 inHg), about 835 mi (1,345 km) east of the Leeward Islands.

September 7

- 12:00 UTC (8:00 a.m. AST) at 24.0°N 55.4°W – Hurricane Larry weakens to Category 2 strength about 805 mi (1,295 km) southeast of Bermuda.

September 8

- 18:00 UTC (1:00 p.m. CDT) at 28.4°N 86.8°W – Tropical Storm Mindy forms from a tropical wave about 160 mi (260 km) southwest of Apalachicola, Florida.

September 9

- 01:15 UTC (8:15 p.m. CDT, September 8) at 29.7°N 85.1°W – Tropical Storm Mindy reaches peak intensity with maximum sustained winds of 60 mph (95 km/h) and a minimum central pressure of 1000 mbar (30 inHg), while simultaneously making landfall on St. Vincent Island, Florida, about 10 mi (20 km) west-southwest of Apalachicola.
- 06:00 UTC (2:00 a.m. EDT) at 30.1°N 60.8°W – Hurricane Larry weakens to Category 1 strength about 275 mi (445 km) southeast of Bermuda.
- 12:00 UTC (8:00 a.m. EDT) at 31.2°N 81.8°W – Tropical Storm Mindy weakens into a tropical depression over southeast Georgia.

September 10

- 00:00 UTC (8:00 p.m. EDT, September 9) at 32.1°N 76.8°W – Tropical Depression Mindy transitions into a post-tropical cyclone offshore over Atlantic Ocean, about 175 mi (280 km) southeast of Wilmington, North Carolina, and later dissipates.

September 11

- 03:30 UTC (11:30 p.m. AST, September 10) at 47.3°N 54.6°W – Hurricane Larry makes landfall near Great Bona Cove, along the south shore of Newfoundland's Burin Peninsula, with sustained winds of 80 mph (130 km/h).
- 12:00 UTC (8:00 a.m. AST) at 52.5°N 49.7°W – Hurricane Larry becomes an extratropical cyclone about 370 mi (595 km) north-northeast of St. John's, Newfoundland and Labrador, and is later absorbed by larger extratropical low.

September 12

- 12:00 UTC (7:00 a.m. CDT) at 21.0°N 95.2°W – Tropical Storm Nicholas forms from a tropical wave about 130 mi (215 km) northeast of Veracruz, Veracruz.

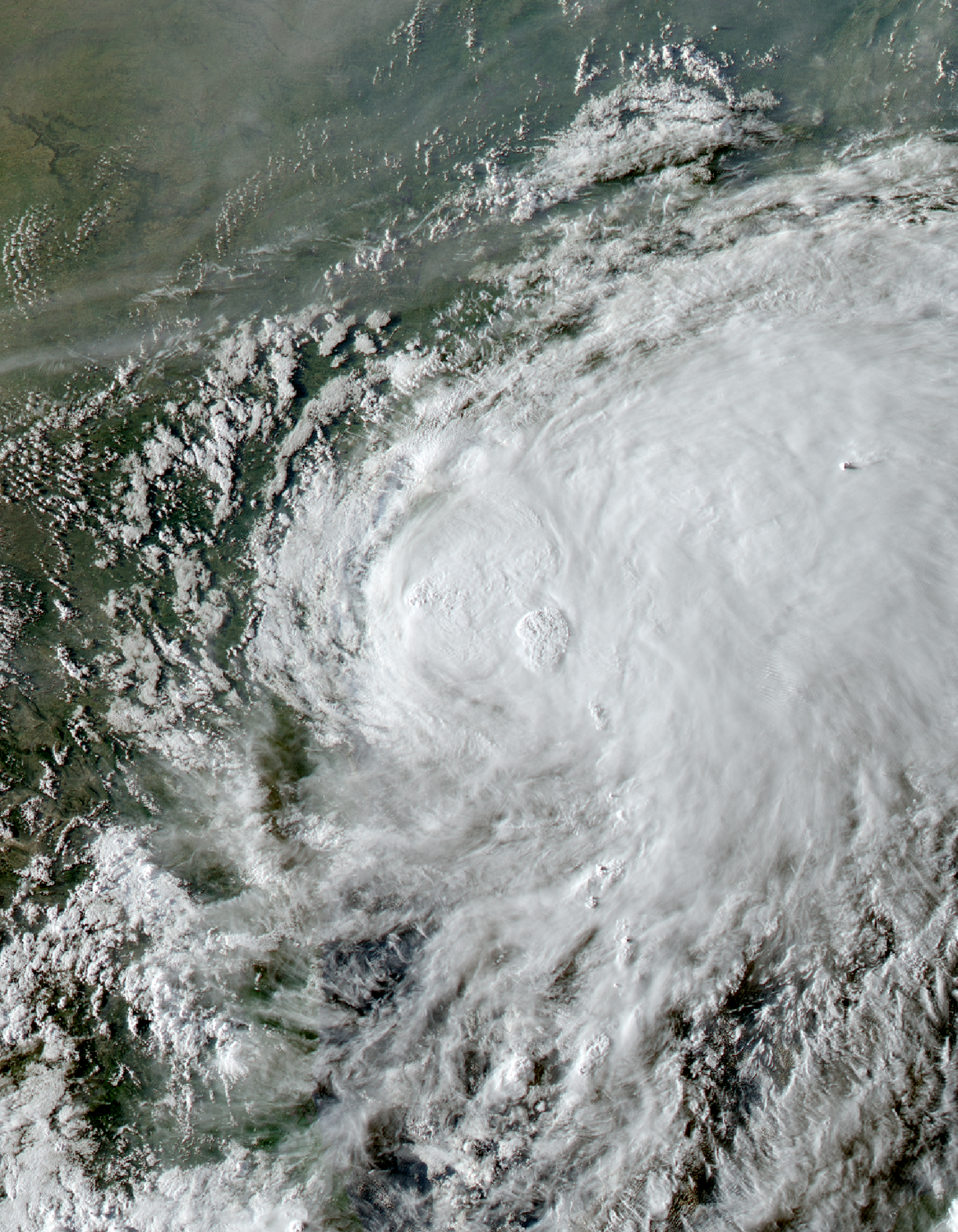
Hurricane Nicholas near the coast of Texas shortly before September 14

September 14

- 00:00 UTC (7:00 p.m. CDT, September 13) at 28.0°N 96.2°W – Tropical Storm Nicholas strengthens into a Category 1 hurricane about 30 mi (45 km) south-southwest of Matagorda, Texas, and simultaneously reaches peak intensity with maximum sustained winds of 65 mph (105 km/h) and a minimum central pressure of 988 mbar (29.2 inHg).
- 05:30 UTC (12:30 a.m. CDT) at 28.7°N 95.7°W – Hurricane Nicholas makes landfall on the eastern portion of the Matagorda Peninsula, less than 10 mi (20 km) west-southwest of Sargent Beach, Texas, with maximum sustained winds of 65 mph (105 km/h).
- 12:00 UTC (7:00 a.m. CDT) at 29.3°N 95.4°W – Hurricane Nicholas weakens into a tropical storm about 30 mi (45 km) south-southwest of Houston, Texas.

September 15

- 00:00 UTC (7:00 p.m. CDT, September 14) at 29.9°N 94.4°W – Tropical Storm Nicholas weakens into a tropical depression about 25 mi (35 km) west of Port Arthur, Texas.
- 18:00 UTC (1:00 p.m. CDT) at 30.2°N 92.4°W – Tropical Depression Nicholas degenerates into a remnant low about 25 mi (35 km) west of Lafayette, Louisiana, and subsequently dissipates.

September 17

- 18:00 UTC (2:00 p.m. EDT) at 35.9°N 72.7°W – Tropical Storm Odette forms from a surface trough associated with a mid- to upper-level low about 175 mi (280 km) east of the North Carolina–Virginia border.

September 18

- 06:00 UTC (2:00 a.m. AST) at 37.6°N 70.1°W – Tropical Storm Odette reaches peak intensity with maximum winds of 45 mph (75 km/h) and a minimum central pressure of 1,005 mbar (29.68 inHg).
- 12:00 UTC (8:00 a.m. AST) at 38.3°N 68.3°W – Tropical Storm Odette transitions into an extratropical cyclone about 290 mi (465 km) east-southeast of Atlantic City, New Jersey, and subsequently opens up into a trough. (Note: The National Hurricane Center monitored Odette's remnants for possible tropical transition from September 19 to September 24. Though the cyclone did lose its frontal features, it never produced a sufficient amount of deep convection to be considered a tropical or subtropical cyclone again.)

Infrared satellite loop of Tropical Storm Peter developing east of the Leeward Islands on September 19

September 19

- 00:00 UTC (8:00 p.m. AST, September 18) at 16.4°N 52.7°W – Tropical Depression Sixteen forms about from a tropical wave about 605 mi (970 km) east of the northern Leeward Islands.
- 00:00 UTC (11:00 p.m. CVT, September 18) at 10.4°N 27.4°W – Tropical Depression Seventeen forms from a tropical wave about 375 mi (600 km) south-southwest of the southernmost Cabo Verde Islands.
- 06:00 UTC (2:00 a.m. AST) at 16.8°N 54.4°W – Tropical Depression Sixteen strengthens into Tropical Storm Peter about 490 mi (785 km) east of the Leeward Islands.
- 18:00 UTC (2:00 p.m. AST) at 17.9°N 57.0°W – Tropical Storm Peter attains its peak intensity with maximum sustained winds of 50 mph (85 km/h) and a minimum central pressure of 1,005 mbar (29.68 inHg), about 320 mi (520 km) east of the northern Leeward Islands.
- 18:00 UTC (5:00 p.m. CVT) at 13.8°N 29.4°W – Tropical Depression Seventeen strengthens into Tropical Storm Rose about 345 mi (555 km) west of the southernmost Cabo Verde Islands.

September 21

- 00:00 UTC (8:00 p.m. AST, September 20) at 18.8°N 35.3°W – Tropical Storm Rose attains its peak intensity with maximum sustained winds of 60 mph (95 km/h) and a minimum central pressure of 1,004 mbar (29.65 inHg), about 680 mi (1,095 km) west-northwest of the Cabo Verde Islands.
- 18:00 UTC (2:00 p.m. AST) at 20.2°N 64.6°W – Tropical Storm Peter weakens to a tropical depression, about 130 mi (215 km) north of Saint Thomas, United States Virgin Islands, and later degenerates into a surface trough. (Note: The National Hurricane Center began monitoring Peter's remnants for possible regeneration on September 25. Although a well-defined surface low formed on September 28, the system never had the organized deep convection characteristics of a tropical cyclone.)

September 22

- 06:00 UTC (2:00 a.m. AST) at 23.1°N 38.1°W – Tropical Storm Rose weakens into a tropical depression 940 mi (1,510 km) west-northwest of the Cabo Verde Islands.
- 12:00 UTC (8:00 a.m. AST) at 23.4°N 38.8°W – Tropical Depression Rose degenerates into a remnant low about 980 mi (1,575 km) west-northwest of the Cabo Verde Islands, and subsequently opens up into a trough of low pressure.
- 18:00 UTC (2:00 p.m. AST) at 10.0°N 33.1°W – Tropical Depression Eighteen forms from a tropical wave about 660 mi (1,065 km) west-southwest of the southernmost Cabo Verde Islands.

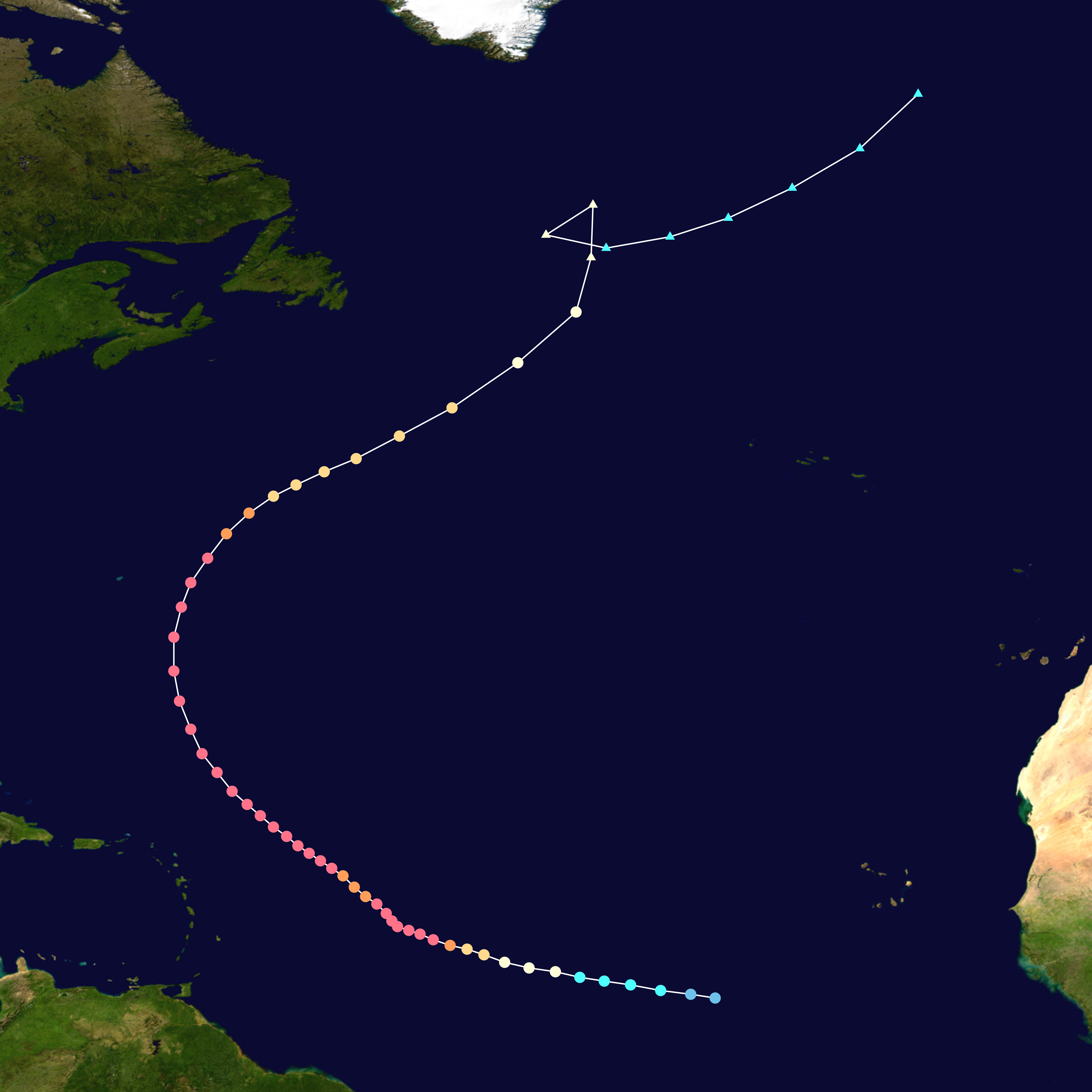
Map plotting the track and the intensity of Hurricane Sam

September 23

- 06:00 UTC (2:00 a.m. AST) at 10.4°N 36.0°W – Tropical Depression Eighteen strengthens into Tropical Storm Sam.

September 24

- 06:00 UTC (2:00 a.m. AST) at 11.4°N 41.6°W – Tropical Storm Sam strengthens into a Category 1 hurricane about 1,265 mi (2,035 km) east of the Windward Islands.
- 06:00 UTC (2:00 a.m. AST) at 31.4°N 62.0°W – A subtropical depression forms from a non-tropical area of disturbed weather about 175 mi (280 km) east-southeast of Bermuda.
- 12:00 UTC (8:00 a.m. AST) at 32.8°N 62.9°W – The subtropical depression strengthens into Subtropical Storm Teresa about 110 mi (175 km) east of Bermuda.
- 18:00 UTC (2:00 p.m. AST) at 33.6°N 64.1°W – Subtropical Storm Teresa reaches its peak intensity with maximum sustained winds of 45 mph (75 km/h) and a minimum central pressure of 1008 mbar (29.77 inHg) about 90 mi (145 km) north of Bermuda.

September 25

- 00:00 UTC (8:00 p.m. AST, September 24) at 12.3°N 45.4°W – Hurricane Sam intensifies to Category 2 strength.
- 12:00 UTC (8:00 a.m. AST) at 12.8°N 47.2°W – Hurricane Sam intensifies to Category 3 strength.
- 12:00 UTC (8:00 a.m. AST) at 34.3°N 65.2°W – Subtropical Storm Teresa weakens into a subtropical depression about 135 mi (220 km) north of Bermuda.
- 18:00 UTC (2:00 p.m. AST) at 13.1°N 48.1°W – Hurricane Sam intensifies to Category 4 strength.
- 18:00 UTC (2:00 p.m. AST) at 34.3°N 64.5°W – Subtropical Depression Teresa degenerates into a remnant low about 135 mi (215 km) north of Bermuda, and subsequently dissipates.

September 26

- 18:00 UTC (2:00 p.m. AST) at 14.1°N 50.3°W – Hurricane Sam reaches its peak intensity with maximum sustained winds of 155 mph (250 km/h) and a minimum central pressure of 927 mbar (27.37 inHg), about 690 mi (1,110 km) east of the Lesser Antilles.

September 27

- 12:00 UTC (8:00 a.m. AST) at 15.4°N 51.7°W – Hurricane Sam weakens to Category 3 strength.

September 28

- 06:00 UTC (2:00 a.m. AST) at 16.9°N 53.5°W – Hurricane Sam re-intensifies to Category 4 strength.

September 29

- 12:00 UTC (11:00 a.m. CVT) at 7.8°N 24.1°W – Tropical Depression Twenty forms from a tropical wave about 535 mi (860 km) south of the Cabo Verde Islands.
- 18:00 UTC (5:00 p.m. CVT) at 8.1°N 25.1°W – Tropical Depression Twenty strengthens into Tropical Storm Victor south of the Cabo Verde Islands.

=== October ===
October 1

- 06:00 UTC (2:00 a.m. AST) at 25.8°N 61.6°W – Hurricane Sam reaches a secondary peak intensity, with winds of 150 mph (240 km/h) and a minimum central pressure of 936 mbar (27.6 inHg) about 490 mi (785 km) south-southeast of Bermuda.
- 12:00 UTC (8:00 a.m. AST) at 11.4°N 33.0°W – Tropical Storm Victor reaches peak intensity with maximum sustained winds of 65 mph (100 km/h) and a minimum central pressure of 997 mbar (29.4 inHg), about 690 mi (1,110 km) west-southwest of the Cabo Verde Islands.

October 2

- 18:00 UTC (2:00 p.m. AST) at 34.7°N 59.1°W – Hurricane Sam weakens to Category 3 strength about 360 mi (585 km) east-northeast of Bermuda.
- 18:00 UTC (2:00 p.m. AST) at 13.5°N 37.7°W – Tropical Storm Victor weakens to a tropical depression about 950 mi (1,530 km) west of the Cabo Verde Islands.

October 3

- 06:00 UTC (2:00 a.m. AST) at 36.7°N 56.6°W – Hurricane Sam weakens to Category 2 strength about 550 mi (890 km) northeast of Bermuda.

October 4

- 12:00 UTC (8:00 a.m. AST) at 17.8°N 43.1°W – Tropical Depression Victor degenerates into a trough more than 1,380 mi (2,220 km) west of the Cabo Verde Islands, and later dissipates.
- 18:00 UTC (6:00 p.m. GMT) at 43.8°N 43.6°W – Hurricane Sam weakens to Category 1 strength about 500 mi (805 km) southeast of Cape Race, Newfoundland.

October 5

- 06:00 UTC (6:00 a.m. GMT) at 49.4°N 39.7°W – Hurricane Sam transitions to a post-tropical cyclone about 650 mi (1,045 km) east of Cape Race, and subsequently merges with another extratropical low.

October 30

- 12:00 UTC (8:00 a.m. AST) at 38.5°N 49.6°W – Subtropical Storm Wanda forms from a nor'easter about 595 mi (955 km) south-southeast of Cape Race, Newfoundland.

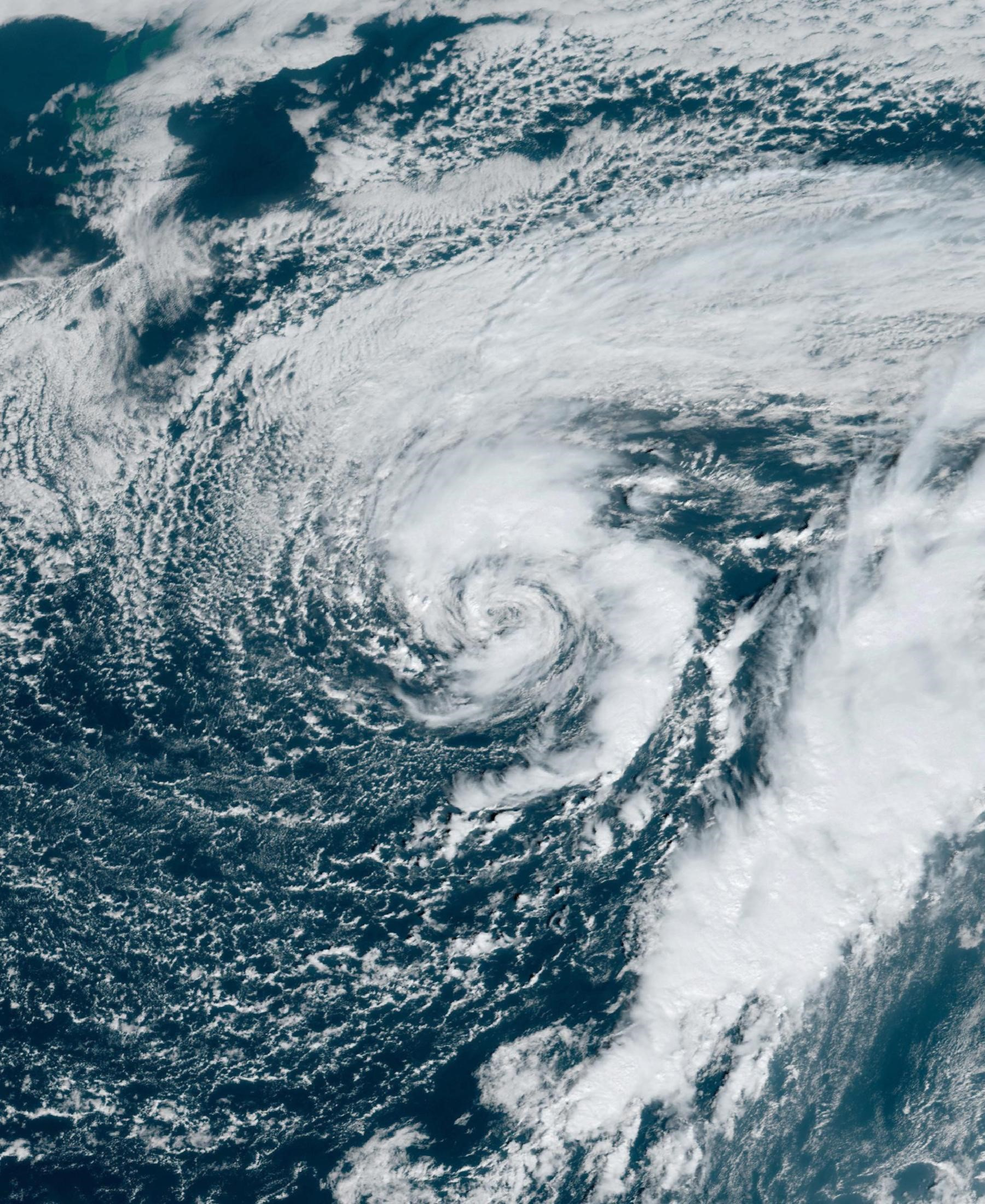
Subtropical Storm Wanda over the Atlantic Ocean on October 31

October 31

- 12:00 UTC (12:00 p.m. GMT) at 36.5°N 43.4°W – Subtropical Storm Wanda attains its peak intensity with maximum sustained winds of 60 mph (95 km/h) and a minimum central pressure of 983 mbar (29.03 inHg), about 905 mi (1,455 km) west of the Azores.

=== November ===
November 1

- 12:00 UTC (12:00 p.m. GMT) at 34.1°N 43.4°W – Subtropical Storm Wanda transitions to a tropical storm about 950 mi (1,530 km) west-southwest of the Azores.

November 7

- 12:00 UTC (12:00 p.m. GMT) at 39.2°N 34.9°W – Tropical Storm Wanda transitions to a post-tropical cyclone about 430 mi (695 km) west-northwest of the Azores, and later dissipates.

November 30

- The 2021 Atlantic hurricane season officially ends.

== See also ==
- Lists of Atlantic hurricanes
- Timeline of the 2021 Pacific hurricane season
