= Tropical Storm Danny (2021) =

Atlantic tropical storm

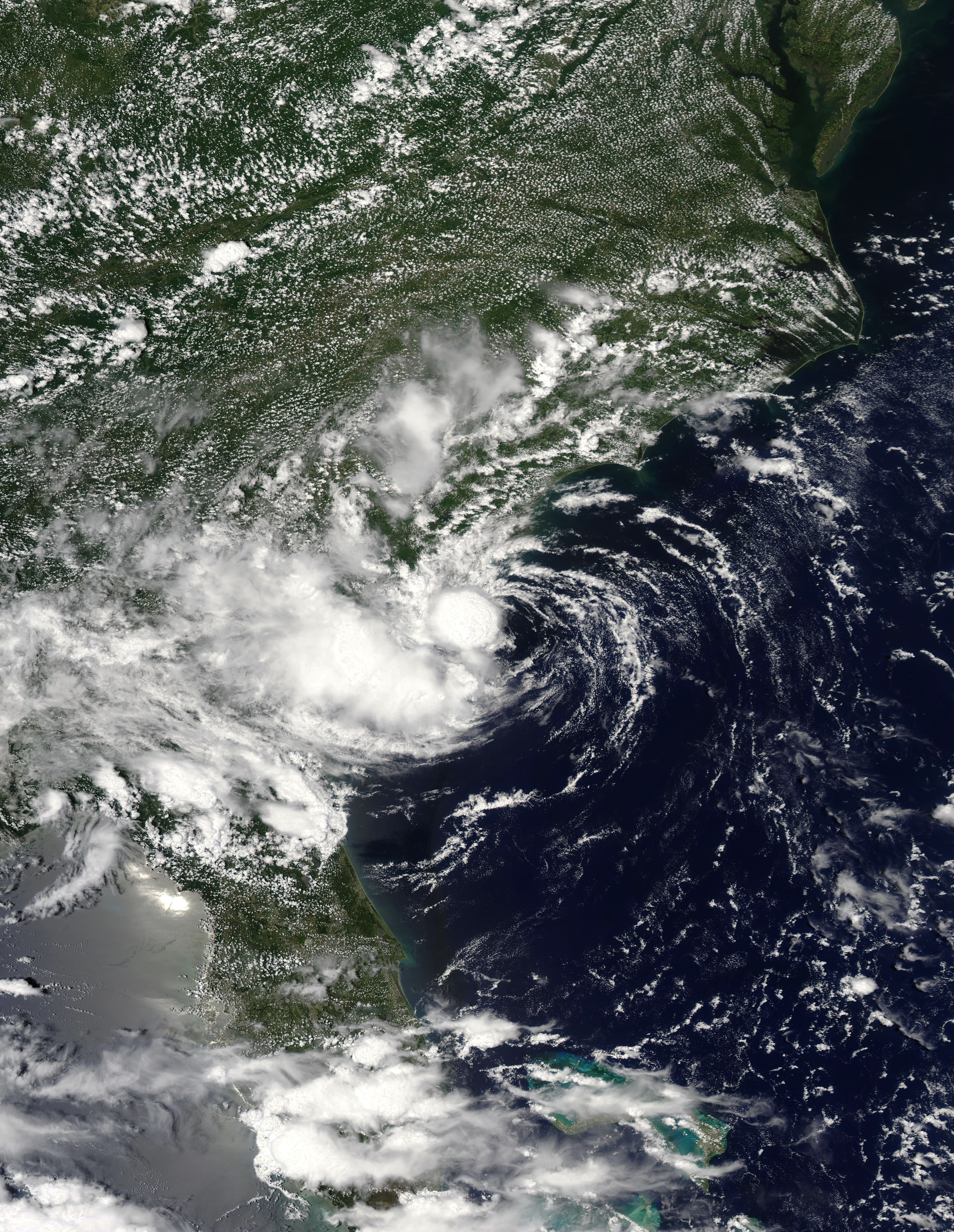
- Tropical Storm Danny at peak intensity on June 28

Meteorological history
- Formed: June 27, 2021
- Dissipated: June 29, 2021

Tropical storm
- 1-minute sustained (SSHWS/NWS)
- Highest winds: 45 mph (75 km/h)
- Lowest pressure: 1009 mbar (hPa); 29.80 inHg

Overall effects
- Fatalities: None
- Damage: $5,000 (2021 USD)
- Areas affected: Southeastern United States (mainly South Carolina and Georgia)
- IBTrACS
- Part of the 2021 Atlantic hurricane season

Tropical Storm Danny was a weak and short-lived tropical cyclone that caused minor damage to the U.S. states of South Carolina and Georgia. The fourth named storm of the 2021 Atlantic hurricane season, the system formed from an area of low-pressure that developed from an upper-level trough over the central Atlantic Ocean on June 22. Moving west-northwestward, the disturbance gradually developed as convection, or showers and thunderstorms, increased over it. Although it was moving over the warm Gulf Stream, the organization of the disturbance was hindered by strong upper-level wind shear. By 18:00 UTC of June 27, as satellite images showed a well-defined center and thunderstorms, the system was upgraded to a tropical depression by the National Hurricane Center (NHC). At 06:00 UTC on the next day, the system further strengthened into Tropical Storm Danny east-southeast of Charleston, South Carolina. Danny continued its track towards South Carolina while slowly strengthening, subsequently reaching its peak intensity at that day of 45 mph (72 km/h) and a minimum central pressure of 1,009 mbar (29.8 inHg) at 18:00 UTC. Danny then made landfall in Pritchards Island, north of Hilton Head, in a slightly weakened state at 23:20 UTC on the same day, with winds of 40 mph (64 km/h) and indicating that Danny weakened prior to moving inland. The system then quickly weakened to a tropical depression over east-central Georgia, before dissipating shortly afterward.

Danny was one of three systems to make landfall on the U.S. state of South Carolina in the month of June, the others being Hurricane One in 1867 and Tropical Depression One in 1979. Heavy rainfall was recorded in some portions of Georgia and South Carolina, causing minor flooding. In addition to flooding, impacts were also limited to some fallen trees and lightning strikes. Ten rescues were required on two different beaches on North Carolina due to rip currents. No deaths were reported due to Danny, and the damage from it in the Southeastern United States totaled $5,000 (2021 USD).

== Meteorological history ==
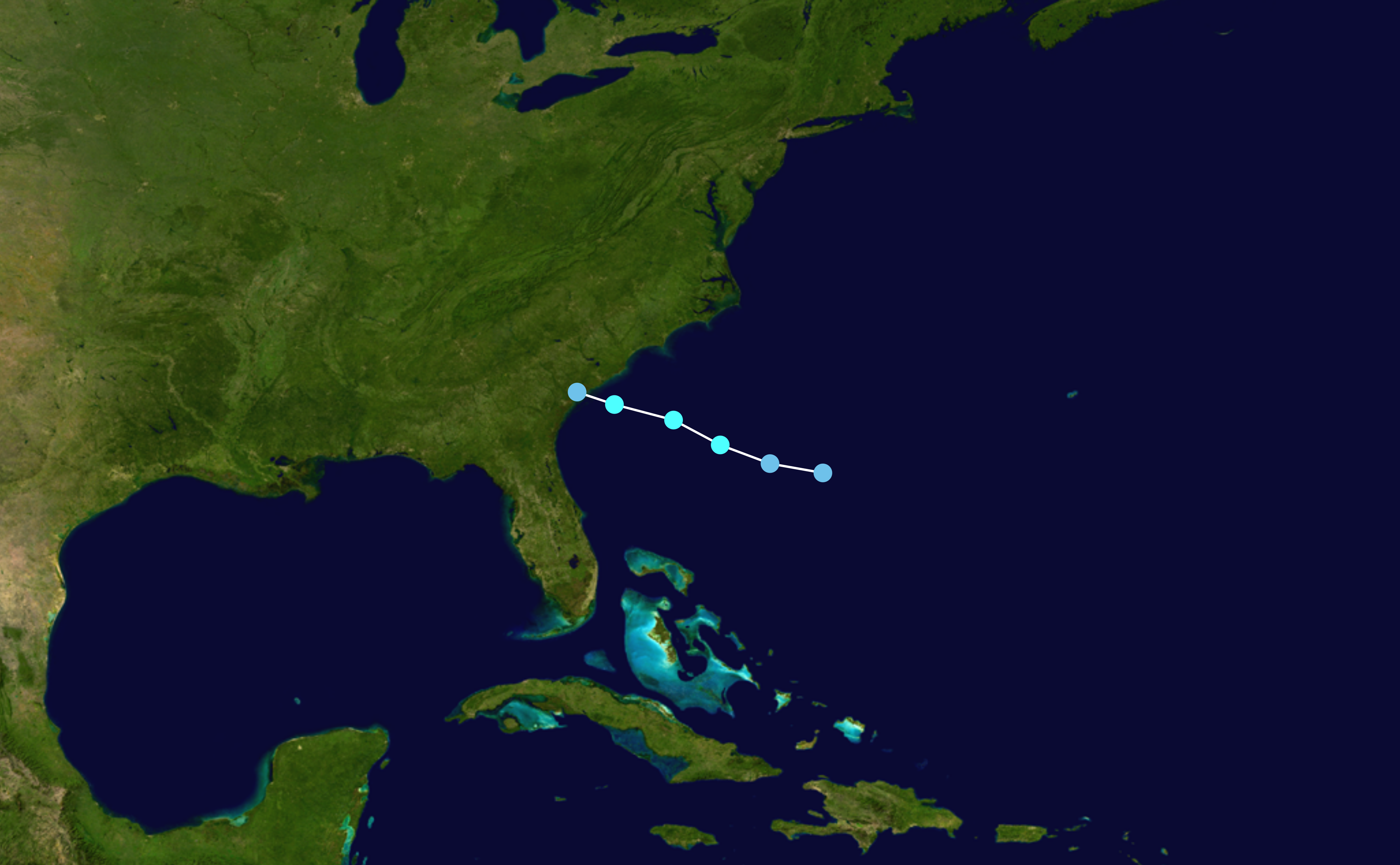
Map plotting the storm's track and intensity, according to the Saffir–Simpson scale Map key Saffir–Simpson scale Tropical depression (≤38 mph, ≤62 km/h) Tropical storm (39–73 mph, 63–118 km/h) Category 1 (74–95 mph, 119–153 km/h) Category 2 (96–110 mph, 154–177 km/h) Category 3 (111–129 mph, 178–208 km/h) Category 4 (130–156 mph, 209–251 km/h) Category 5 (≥157 mph, ≥252 km/h) Unknown Storm type Tropical cyclone Subtropical cyclone Extratropical cyclone, remnant low, tropical disturbance, or monsoon depression

On June 22, an upper-level trough separated from the jet stream and evolved into an upper-level low-pressure system. Two days later, the low-pressure area turned westward under the influence of a strong ridge to its north. Disorganized convection, or showers and thunderstorms, increased as the system moved over warmer waters. Near this time, a surface trough in relation to the upper-level low became better defined. Over the next few days, the trough moved west-northwestward, and on June 26, the National Hurricane Center (NHC) began to monitor the disturbance for development as it passed several hundred miles south of Bermuda. On June 27, ship observations, buoy, and satellite imagery revealed that a small area of low pressure had developed about 500 miles (800 km) east-southeast of the Georgia-South Carolina border. Surface pressure decreased, and over the next 12 hours, the system continued to organize. At 18:00 UTC on June 27, the disturbance consolidated into a tropical depression, but operationally, the NHC did not upgrade the system to a tropical depression until 15:00 UTC on June 28, while it was located offshore South Carolina. A short time after formation, convection over the system decreased, and low-level circulation center (LLCC) became partially exposed. Convection remained displaced to the northwest of the center due to strong upper-level wind shear. Nevertheless, an advanced scatterometer pass discovered peak winds of 40 mph (64 km/h) – tropical storm-force – early on June 28. The NHC estimated that the depression strengthened into a tropical storm at 06:00 UTC that day, receiving the name Danny.

On the morning of June 28, the cloud structure of the cyclone continued to consolidate, sporting deep convection with cloud top temperatures of −76 °F (−60 °C) on its western periphery. Later, in the afternoon, a mass of deep convection quickly expanded over Danny's center. A U.S. Air Force Hurricane Hunter reconnaissance aircraft found gale-force surface winds of 45 mph (72 km/h), and NEXRAD radar in Charleston also found data supporting this value. Thus, it is estimated that Danny reached its peak intensity with maximum sustained winds of 45 mph (70 km/h) and a minimum barometric pressure of 1009 mb (29.80 inHg) at 18:00 UTC on July 28. Steadily maintaining its motion, Danny made landfall on Pritchards Island, South Carolina, north of Hilton Head Island, as a minimal tropical storm at 23:20 UTC, with winds of 40 mph (65 km/h). This indicated that the storm weakened slightly before moving inland. While moving ashore, a weather station at Folly Beach recorded a wind gust of 41 mph (66 kph) as Danny moved inland. Upon entering the east-central portion of Georgia, the system weakened to a tropical depression as evidenced by Doppler weather radar velocity data and surface observations. The weakening tropical cyclone dissipated by 06:00 UTC on July 29.

== Preparations and impact ==
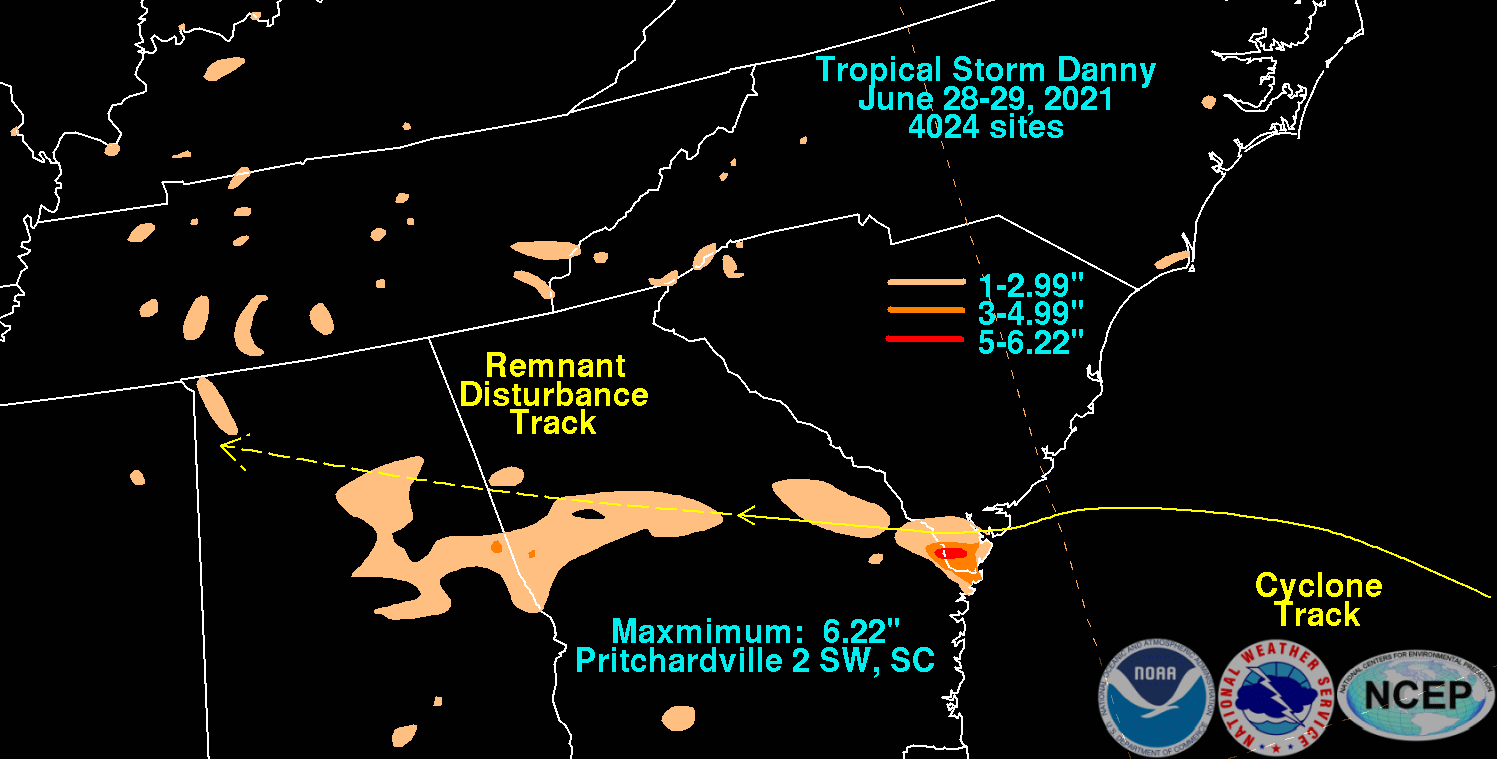
Map of rainfall accumulations from Tropical Storm Danny across the United States

Danny's tropical cyclogenesis was poorly forecast due to the disorganized nature of the precursor disturbance and low model confidence. This resulted in tropical cyclone watches and warnings occurring only 12 hours before landfall. A Tropical Storm Warning was issued from Edisto Beach to Santee River in South Carolina at 15:00 UTC on June 28. The warnings in the state from Danny were canceled at 03:00 UTC on June 29 as the system weakened to a tropical depression, inland Georgia. The Storm Prediction Center, in anticipation of Danny, also published a marginal risk of severe weather on the state on June 29, along with a 2 percent tornado risk. As the system moved inland, Lake Wind Advisories were also issued on portions of the South Carolina Midlands on the same day. Despite Danny being predicted not to bring any major impacts to the Southeastern United States, portions of Georgia, South Carolina, and northern Alabama were expected to see increased rainfall from the system, causing the potential of flash flooding. Double red flags were placed on Myrtle Beach, South Carolina to warn people that swimming in the area was prohibited, along with a high risk of rip currents from Sumter to Charleston beaches. This, however, did not stop people from going to beaches.

Danny was one of three systems to make landfall in South Carolina in the month of June, the others being an unnamed Category 1 hurricane in 1867 and an unnamed tropical depression in 1979. Palmetto Electric and Dominion Energy both reported over 1,251 power outages in total in Beaufort County, South Carolina. Lightning strikes were also observed in the state, along with minor flooding and heavy rainfall. A tree was downed in SC 170 and downed trees also occurred in Savannah, Georgia. Minor flooding was reported in portions of Jasper and Horry Counties in South Carolina as well as Chatham County, Georgia. Purrysburg, South Carolina received the highest rainfall total from Danny, accumulating to 5.21 inches (132 mm). Severe storms from Danny pushed as far west as West Tennessee. Ten rescues were required on Carolina Beach and Wrightsville Beach in North Carolina due to rip currents on June 28.

== See also ==
- Weather of 2021
- Timeline of the 2021 Atlantic hurricane season
- Tropical cyclones in 2021
- Other storms with the same name
- Tropical Storm Bertha (2020) – also formed unexpectedly offshore the Southeastern United States and followed a similar track.
