= Hurricane Beryl =

Category 5 Atlantic hurricane in 2024

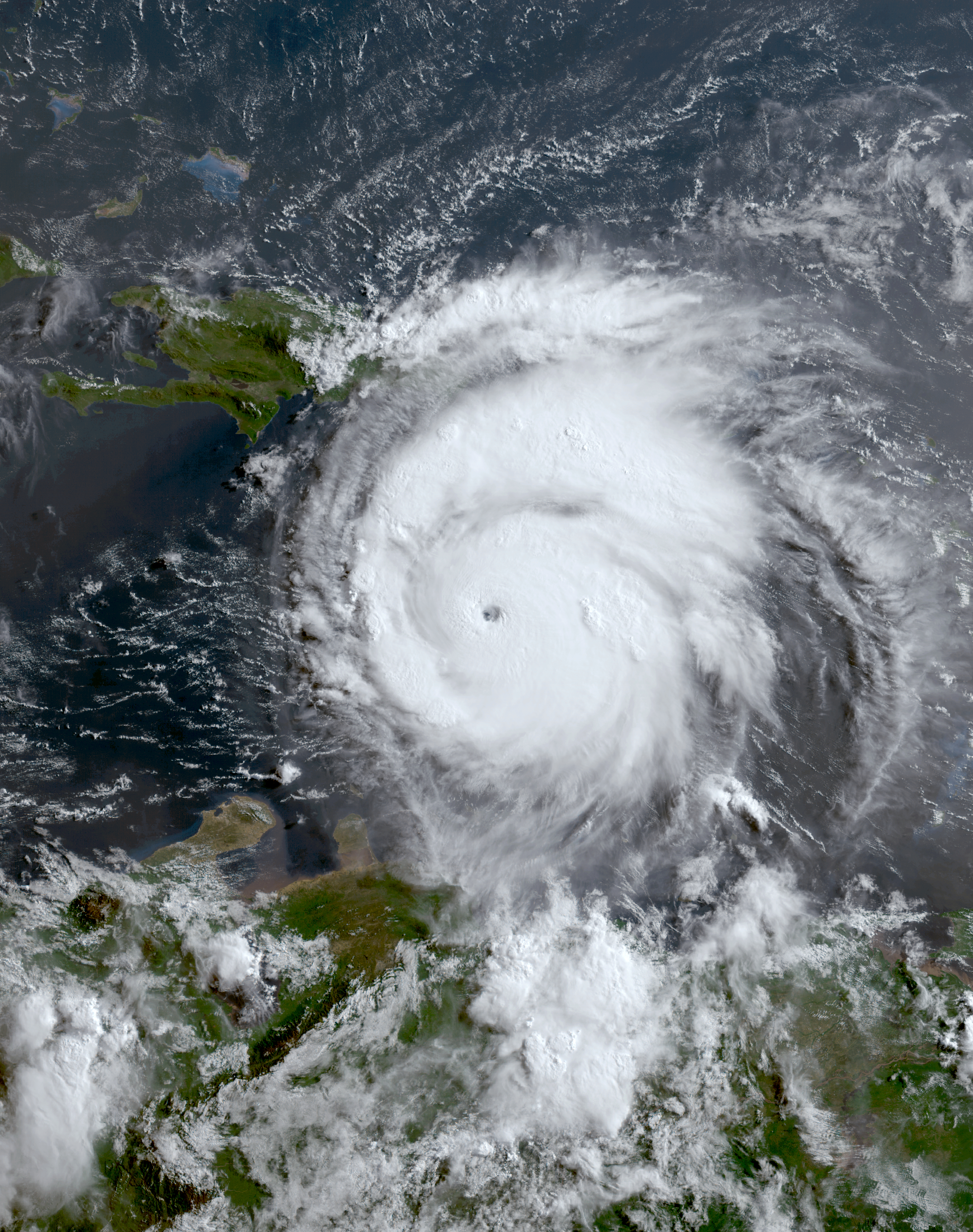
- Hurricane Beryl over the eastern Caribbean Sea near peak intensity on July 2

Meteorological history
- Formed: June 28, 2024
- Extratropical: July 9, 2024
- Dissipated: July 11, 2024

Category 5 major hurricane
- 1-minute sustained (SSHWS/NWS)
- Highest winds: 165 mph (270 km/h)
- Lowest pressure: 932 mbar (hPa); 27.52 inHg

Overall effects
- Fatalities: 73 total
- Missing: 5
- Damage: >$9.05 billion (2024 USD)
- Areas affected: Barbados; Windward Islands; Venezuela; Colombia; Hispaniola; Jamaica; Cayman Islands; Yucatán Peninsula; Belize; Midwestern United States; Atlantic Canada
- IBTrACS
- Part of the 2024 Atlantic hurricane season
- Effects: Tornado outbreak; Other wikis: Commons: Beryl images

Hurricane Beryl (/ˈbɛrɪl/, BEHR-ril) was an extremely rare and destructive tropical cyclone that impacted parts of the Caribbean, the Yucatán Peninsula, and the Gulf Coast of the United States in late June and early July 2024. The second named storm, first hurricane, first major hurricane, and first Category 5 hurricane on the Saffir–Simpson scale of the extremely active 2024 Atlantic hurricane season, the system broke many meteorological records, primarily for formation and intensity. Beryl was one of only two Atlantic hurricanes to reach Category 5 hurricane status in July, along with Emily in 2005. Beryl was both the earliest-forming Category 4 and Category 5 hurricane on record in the Atlantic Ocean, and the strongest hurricane to develop within the Main Development Region of the Atlantic before the month of July.

Beryl developed from a tropical wave that left the coast of Africa on June 25. After forming on June 28 in the Main Development Region, it began rapidly intensifying as it moved west through the central tropical Atlantic. On July 1, Beryl made landfall on the island of Carriacou, Grenada, as a Category 4 hurricane, causing significant damage. The hurricane intensified further as it entered the Caribbean Sea, peaking as a Category 5 hurricane early the next morning with maximum sustained winds of 165 mph (270 km/h) and a minimum central pressure of 932 mbar (27.52 inHg). Over the next few days, Beryl slowly weakened due to wind shear as it passed south of Jamaica and then the Cayman Islands. It briefly re-intensified into a Category 3 hurricane before weakening again as it made landfall in Tulum, Quintana Roo, as a high-end Category 1 hurricane on July 5. After weakening into a tropical storm over the Yucatán Peninsula, the system moved into the Gulf of Mexico, where it gradually reorganized into a Category 1 hurricane on July 8, just before making its final landfall near Matagorda, Texas. Beryl slowly weakened over land as it accelerated to the northeast, eventually becoming post-tropical over the state of Arkansas on July 9 and dissipating over Ontario on July 11.

Damage and casualties from the hurricane were widespread. Beryl caused catastrophic impacts on Grenada's northern islands of Carriacou and Petite Martinique, damaging or destroying 99% of buildings on the former and 70% on the latter. Several of Saint Vincent and the Grenadines' southern islands, such as Canouan, Mayreau, and Union Island, had 80%-90% of dwellings damaged to some degree. On Barbados, Beryl damaged more than 200 boats and about 40 homes. In the Venezuelan state of Sucre, the Manzanares River overflowed, flooding more than 6,000 homes. Landslides and rough seas destroyed some structures in the Dominican Republic, while the hurricane damaged crops, dwellings, and infrastructure on Jamaica. The Yucatán Peninsula of Mexico also sustained damage from the hurricane, although it was generally limited to downed trees and power lines and damaged roofs; there was also widespread flooding. In the United States, the state of Texas experienced severe flooding and wind damage, while about 2.7 million people lost electricity. Additionally, the hurricane and its remnants produced a prolific tornado outbreak, with 68 tornadoes confirmed in the United States and 2 in Ontario. Overall, Beryl caused 73 deaths, including 48 in the United States, 8 in Saint Vincent and the Grenadines, 6 each in Grenada and Venezuela, 4 in Jamaica, and 1 in Canada. Additionally, Beryl inflicted at least $9.05 billion in damage, with $7.2 billion in the United States, $995 million in Jamaica, $231 million in Saint Vincent and the Grenadines, $218 million in Grenada, $96.5 million in Barbados, $90 million in Mexico, $2.1 million in the Cayman Islands, and $2 million in Saint Lucia. Due to extensive damage and casualties, the World Meteorological Organization retired the name Beryl after the season, and was replaced by Brianna starting from the 2030 season.

== Meteorological history ==
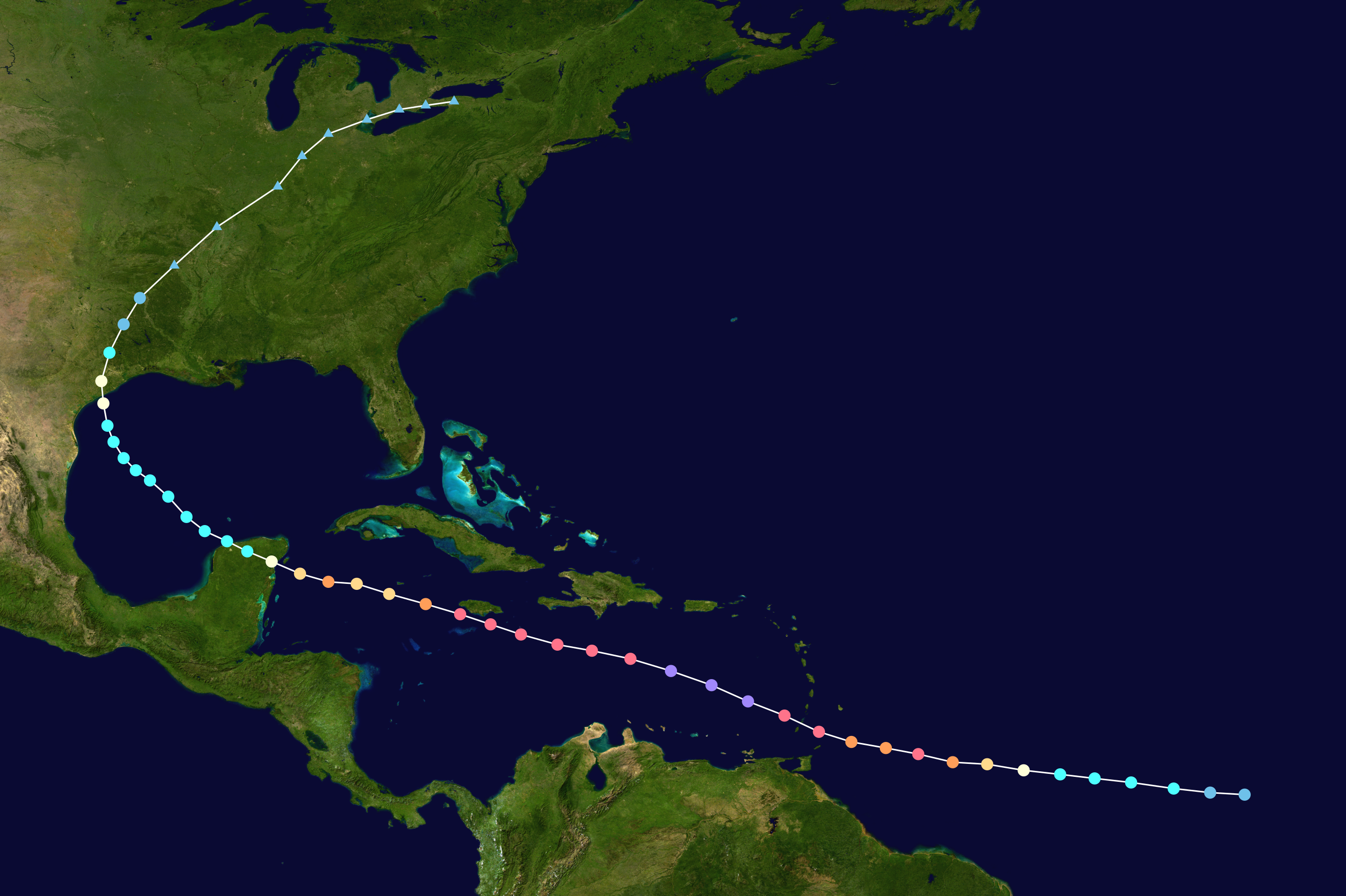
Map plotting the storm's track and intensity, according to the Saffir–Simpson scale Map key Saffir–Simpson scale Tropical depression (≤38 mph, ≤62 km/h) Tropical storm (39–73 mph, 63–118 km/h) Category 1 (74–95 mph, 119–153 km/h) Category 2 (96–110 mph, 154–177 km/h) Category 3 (111–129 mph, 178–208 km/h) Category 4 (130–156 mph, 209–251 km/h) Category 5 (≥157 mph, ≥252 km/h) Unknown Storm type Tropical cyclone Subtropical cyclone Extratropical cyclone, remnant low, tropical disturbance, or monsoon depression

A tropical wave emerged off the coast of West Africa on June 23, producing disorganized showers south of Cabo Verde. By the evening of June 27, the satellite presentation of the disturbance was beginning to show some organization, with curved bands developing around a broad circulation. Environmental conditions at the time were described as being "unusually conducive" for tropical cyclogenesis across the central and western tropical Atlantic for late June, with near record-warm sea surface temperatures (SST) of about 82 °F (28 °C), light wind shear of 6–12 mph (9–19 km/h), plus high mid-level relative humidity of around 70%. The disturbance developed further over the next day, with persistent thunderstorm activity occurring. The tropical wave developed into a tropical depression at 12:00 UTC on June 28 about 1,380 mi (2,220 km) east of Barbados. The depression strengthened into Tropical Storm Beryl by 00:00 UTC on June 29, with thunderstorms organizing into a central dense overcast, with a symmetric cloud pattern surrounded by rainbands.

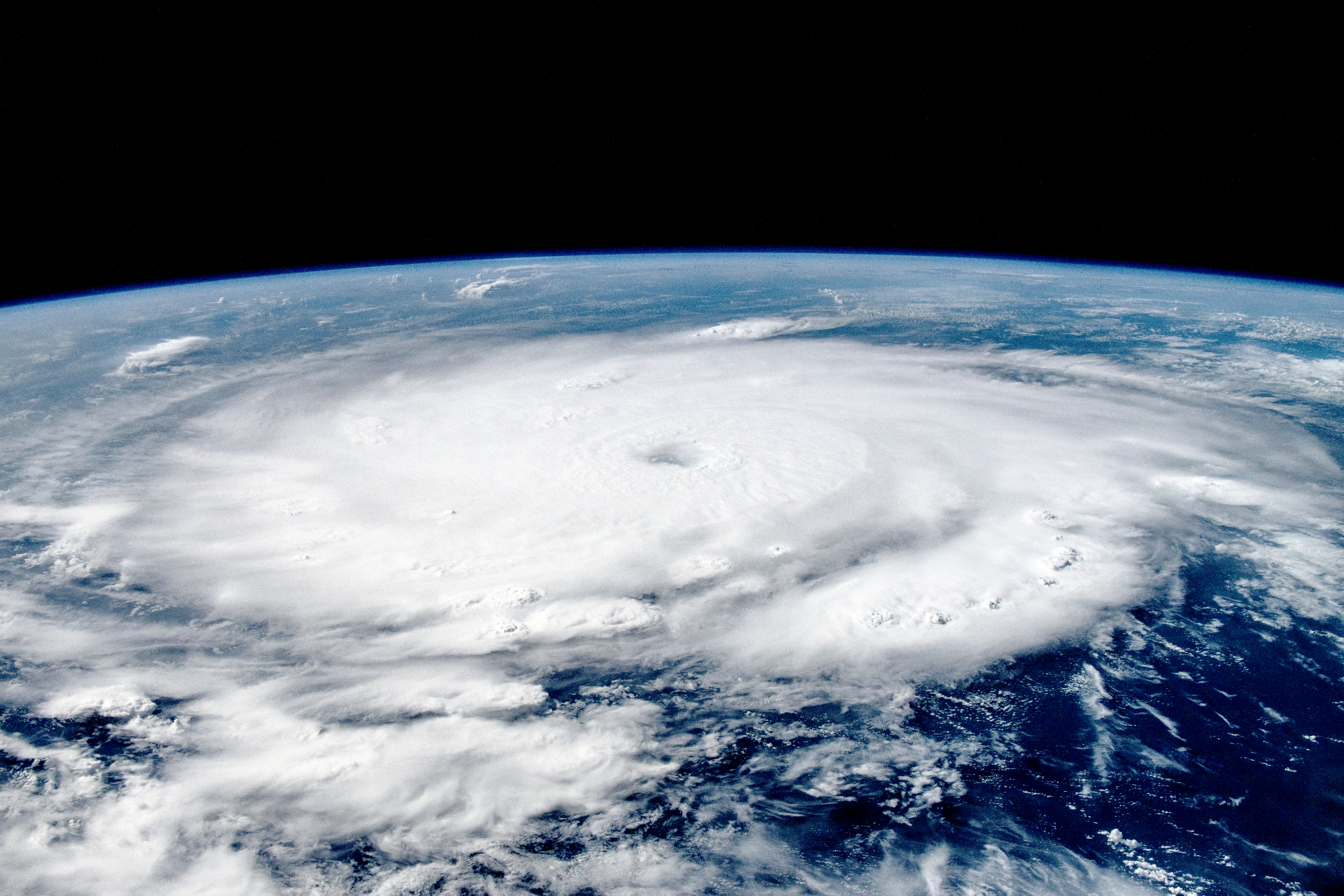
View of Hurricane Beryl from the International Space Station on July 1

Continuing its rapid intensification, Beryl became a hurricane on June 29 as the inner core of the thunderstorms developed into an eye. Beryl intensified into a Category 3 major hurricane around 12:00 UTC on June 30 and a Category 4 hurricane six hours later. An eyewall replacement cycle then weakened Beryl to a Category 3 hurricane early on July 1, but it regained Category 4 strength six hours later once the cycle was completed. At 15:10 UTC the same day, Beryl made landfall in Carriacou, Grenada, with winds of 140 mph (220 km/h). After entering the Caribbean, Hurricane Hunters found that Beryl further intensified into a Category 5 hurricane early on July 2 and soon peaked with winds of 165 mph (270 km/h) a minimum pressure of 932 mbar (27.5 inHg), recorded by a dropsonde about 510 mi (820 km) east-southeast of Beata Island.

Increasing wind shear led Beryl to begin weakening later on July 2 as it passed well south of Hispaniola, falling to Category 4 intensity. Beryl passed 15–25 mi (30–35 km) south of southern Jamaica late on July 3 and early on July 4. Around 12:00 UTC on the latter date, the cyclone weakened to a Category 2 hurricane southeast of the Cayman Islands. Beryl briefly regained major hurricane status early on July 5 but quickly weakened back. At 11:00 UTC, the storm struck Mexico near Tulum, Quintana Roo, as a Category 1 hurricane with winds of 90 mph (150 km/h). Beryl fell to tropical storm status before reaching the Gulf of Mexico later on July 5. That night and into the next day, in addition to a broader inner core, Beryl was beset by an infusion of dry air and by moderate wind shear which kept the storm from strengthening appreciably. Even so, by the afternoon of July 6, its convective structure had improved and become more persistent. Beryl turned to the north-northwest on July 7, and slowed to 10 mph (17 km/h). Early on July 8, Hurricane Hunters showed Beryl became a Category 1 hurricane before striking near Matagorda, Texas, at 08:40 UTC with winds of 90 mph (150 km/h). While crossing Greater Houston, Beryl weakened to a tropical storm at 18:00 UTC and turned northeastward. Around 00:00 UTC on July 9, the cyclone weakened to a tropical depression, about 12 hours before becoming extratropical over Arkansas. The extratropical remnants crossed the Midwestern United States and southern Ontario before being absorbed near Buffalo, New York by a frontal system on July 11.

=== Records ===
Beryl is the easternmost hurricane to form in the tropical Atlantic in June – 41.9°W, beating the mark set by the 1933 Trinidad hurricane – 58.9°W. Additionally, on June 30, it became the earliest Category 4 hurricane on record in the basin, surpassing the previous record set on July 8, 2005, by Hurricane Dennis, and the strongest June hurricane as measured by wind speed, surpassing Hurricane Audrey of 1957. It later became the earliest Category 5 hurricane on record, surpassing the record set on July 16, 2005, by Hurricane Emily, as well as becoming the strongest July hurricane on record by wind speed, and the highest accumulated cyclone energy-generating storm before August. (Note: A storm's ACE index represents the sum of the squares of the maximum 1-minute sustained wind speed (knots) for that named storm measured every six hours while it is at least tropical storm intensity (≤33 kn (38 mph; 61 km/h)), divided by 10,000.)

Beryl was the strongest cyclone to hit Grenada or its dependencies. Beryl also became the first tropical system on record to undergo rapid intensification in the Main Development Region of the Atlantic during the month of June. Furthermore, it intensified from tropical storm to Category 5 hurricane in only 42 hours. Only seven other Atlantic storms are known to have achieved this rate of intensification, with Beryl the only one to do so earlier than August. According to an analysis by ClimaMeter, a project of the Climate and Environment Sciences Laboratory, Beryl's extreme winds and heavy precipitation were strengthened by climate change. Natural climate variability, notably the Pacific decadal oscillation and the Atlantic multidecadal oscillation, likely played a role as well.

== Preparations ==
=== Lesser Antilles ===
Barbados, Grenada, Saint Vincent and the Grenadines, and Saint Lucia were put under a hurricane warning on June 29. Tobago was also put under a hurricane warning on June 30, as was Martinique, along with a vigilance orange. Trinidad was also put under a tropical storm warning, and Dominica placed under a tropical storm watch. Caribbean Airlines postponed several flights between Barbados, Grenada, Saint Vincent and the Grenadines, and Trinidad and Tobago on June 30. Virgin Atlantic and British Airways also canceled flights in the region as the storm approached.

A state of emergency was declared for Tobago. Ferry schedules were modified on June 30 in Trinidad and Tobago. All ferries to Tobago for July 1 were canceled. Schools across the nation were closed for July 1. As of that morning, the 14 shelters across Tobago sheltered 142 people. Around 160 yachts moved into the nation's waters seeking shelter.

All businesses on Barbados were ordered to be closed by the evening of July 1, and all waterlines were shut down. The India national cricket team was unable to return home from Barbados after winning the 2024 ICC Men's T20 World Cup; scores of fans were also stranded on the island. As Beryl passed nearby, more than 400 people were staying in hurricane shelters across Barbados.

A curfew was instated in Grenada on June 30, and a week-long state of emergency was declared by Governor-General Cécile La Grenade. A Caribbean Community meeting in Grenada, scheduled to run from July 3 to July 5, was canceled. On June 29, Prime Minister Philip J. Pierre of Saint Lucia ordered a national shutdown there. A curfew was also imposed in Saint Vincent and the Grenadines, and the government shut down. In Saint Vincent and the Grenadines, 1,752 people sought refuge from Beryl in shelters, as did over 1,600 people in Grenada.

=== Greater Antilles ===
The Caribbean coast of the Dominican Republic and Haiti were put under a tropical storm warning on July 2. The advisory was raised on July 3 to a hurricane watch for southwestern Haiti, and an orange alert was put into effect. Additionally, a national cloud cover warning was activated for the Dominican Republic. At least 89 people were in shelters in the southwest of the country.

Jamaica's Disaster Risk Coordination Committee convened on July 1 to prepare for the hurricane. The island was placed under a hurricane warning on July 2. Additionally, a state of emergency was imposed as the island was declared a disaster zone as the hurricane approached. Also, a nationwide evacuation order was issued for residents of communities prone to flooding and landslides. Norman Manley International Airport and Sangster International Airport were closed on July 3. A nationwide curfew was implemented by the government on July 3. Over 1,000 people across the nation were in shelters. The Miss Universe Jamaica Grand Coronation, which was scheduled for July 6, was postponed.

The Cayman Islands was put under a hurricane warning on July 2. Owen Roberts International Airport and Charles Kirkconnell International Airport were closed the following day. Just under 4,000 persons were evacuated off of the Cayman Islands; several hundred people were evacuated into government Shelters. Cayman Islands Regiment and Cayman Islands Coast Guard fully deployed for humanitarian aid and disaster relief operations.

Norwegian, Carnival, and Disney cruise lines all altered their planned itineraries to avoid the hurricane. Additionally, the various air carriers, including: Cayman Airways, American Airlines, Southwest, Delta, United, Air Canada, adjusted their flight schedules in the region on account of the storm.

=== Mexico and Belize ===
On July 1, Quintana Roo was placed on a blue alert in preparation for Beryl. Officials upgraded the alert to red three days later. On July 2, the Yucatán state government activated 2,000 shelters. In Quintana Roo, the Mexican Defense Ministry opened 120 shelters; schools throughout the state were closed, as were public beaches. Upward of 25,600 federal troops and national electricity company workers were mobilized throughout the region. Officials prepared 9,000 U.S. gal (34,000 L) of potable water for distribution. They also moved sea turtle eggs off beaches around Cancún in an attempt to protect them from storm surge. About 2,200 people were staying in shelters as the system moved through. The eastern coast of the Yucatán Peninsula was placed under a set of advisories on July 3: a hurricane warning for the coast of the Yucatán Peninsula from Puerto Costa Maya, Quintana Roo, to Cancún; a tropical storm warning south of Puerto Costa Maya to Chetumal, and north of Cancún to Cabo Catoche; and a tropical storm watch west of Cabo Catoche to Campeche, Campeche. More than 300 flights into Cancún International Airport and Tulum International Airport were canceled as Beryl moved in, and Tulum Airport suspended all operations from the afternoon of July 4 through midday July 7. Tren Maya halted operations until July 6. As Beryl moved across the western Gulf of Mexico, a hurricane watch was issued on July 5 for coastal Tamaulipas, from Barra El Mezquital to the mouth of the Rio Grande.

On July 3, a Tropical Storm Watch was issued for the Caribbean coast of Belize, extending from Belize City to Corozal, including the islands of Ambergris Caye and Caye Caulker. Residents in the northern part of Belize were advised to prepare for flooding. The watch was upgraded to a warning on July 4.

=== United States ===
Houston NEXRAD showing Beryl making landfall near Matagorda, Texas on July 8

In Texas, 121 of the state's counties were placed under a severe weather disaster declaration as Beryl approached. The NHC issued hurricane warnings from Baffin Bay to Port Bolivar, including Greater Houston, as well as tropical storm warnings extending southward to the Mexico border and northeastward to Sabine Pass. A storm surge warning was also put into effect from Padre Island to San Luis Pass, including Corpus Christi Bay and Matagorda Bay. Authorities in several coastal counties issued voluntary evacuation orders for residents in low lying and unprotected areas. A mandatory evacuation order was issued in Refugio County by County Judge Jhiela Poynter who said that she "didn't want to take any chances" following the effects of Hurricane Harvey on the county in 2017. On July 4, Shell and Chevron began moving non-essential employees from oil platforms located off the Texas coast, and preparing them to weather the storm. On July 7, FEMA pre-positioned personnel, commodities, and supplies on the ground in Texas to support state-led hurricane response efforts for 67 counties. On July 10, nineteen shelters housing 641 occupants were set up by FEMA, while about twenty cooling centers were established to mitigate heat-related symptoms. 160 boil water notices were issued for twelve counties. The Alabama-Coushatta Tribe of Texas located in Polk County declared a state of emergency. All flights into and out from Houston's William P. Hobby Airport and George Bush Intercontinental Airport on July 6 were either delayed or canceled as Beryl approached. Train service across southeastern Texas were canceled, including parts of Amtrak's Sunset Limited and Texas Eagle, as well as Union Pacific, BNSF Railway and Canadian Pacific Kansas City.

A Rice University Kinder Institute for Urban Research survey found that two-thirds of Texan residents felt prepared, but six-tenths felt that their governmental bodies were unprepared. The most common personal preparations were charging portable batteries and filling a car's gas tank or battery.

== Impact ==
Impact by country / territory
Country/territory	Deaths	Damage (USD)	Ref
Barbados	0	$96.5 million	
Cayman Islands	0	$2.1 million	
Canada	1	Unknown	
Dominican Republic	0	Unknown	
Grenada	6	$218 million	
Haiti	0	Minimal	
Jamaica	4	$995 million	
Martinique	0	Unknown	
Mexico	0	$90 million	
Saint Lucia	0	$2 million	
Saint Vincent and the Grenadines	8	$231 million	
Trinidad and Tobago	0	Unknown	
United States	48 (Note: 44 deaths in Texas, 2 in Louisiana, and 2 in Vermont)	$7.2 billion	
Venezuela	6	Unknown	
Total	73	$9.05 billion	

=== Lesser Antilles ===
Beryl moved through the Lesser Antilles as a powerful Category 4 hurricane, battering structures, uprooting trees, and causing near-total power and communication outages across much of the island chain.

==== Saint Vincent and the Grenadines ====
In Saint Vincent and the Grenadines, eight fatalities have been confirmed. At least three of the dead were killed by flying debris, one man was crushed when part of his home collapsed, and another man bled out after being cut on the hand, and another person died from a collapsing structure. Two persons died to unknown causes. Also, the MV Guidance II, a 150 ft-long (46 m) ferry with five crew members on board, has been missing from near Canouan Harbor since July 1, when Beryl passed through. The nation suffered $231 million dollars in damage, which was 22% of the GDP. The greatest damage was sustained on the islands of Canouan, Mayreau, and Union, where over 90% of homes were damaged or destroyed. 6,000 houses were damaged or destroyed. Half of the population of Union Island was displaced to Saint Vincent. Across the Southern Grenadines, $187 million in damage was suffered, over 80% of the national total. Also, the Palm Island Resort, on nearby Palm Island suffered extensive damage. Bequia and Petit Saint Vincent had considerable damage as well.

==== Grenada ====
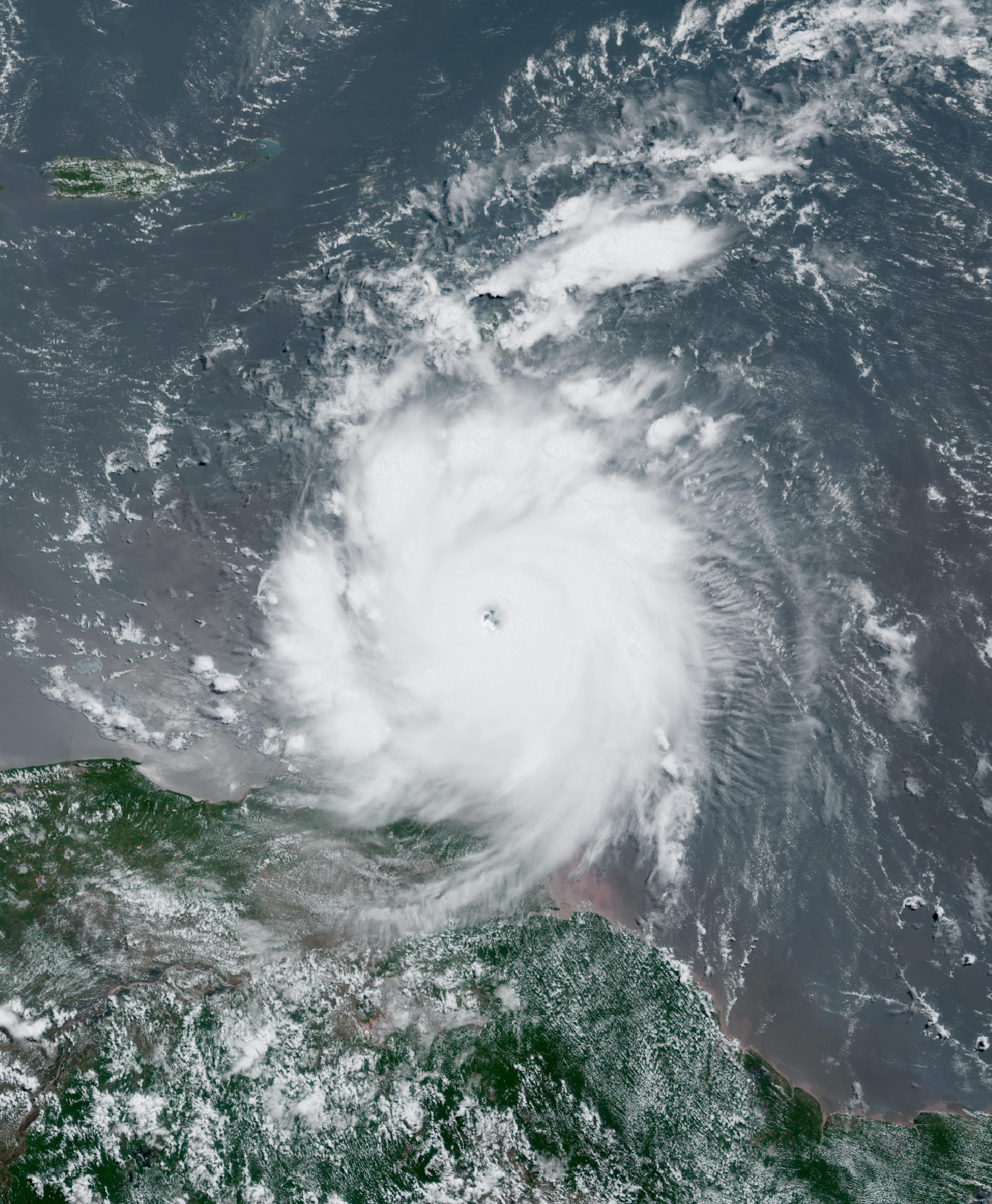
Beryl over the Grenadines as a powerful Category 4 hurricane

In Grenada, the island of Carriacou was stripped of all vegetation and its marinas were significantly damaged. There, and on neighboring Petite Martinique, Beryl inflicted significant damage to houses and buildings, and severely disrupted the electrical grid. On the island of Grenada, about 95% of residents lost power, and telecommunications stopped working. Additionally, household water storage tanks and cisterns across the islands were either destroyed or compromised by the hurricane; the public water infrastructure also suffered significant damage. There were six fatalities altogether, among them: one person died in St. George's when a tree fell upon their house, while two persons were killed on Carriacou.

Total damage in the country reached $218 million.

==== Other islands ====
Businesses, homes and roads in Barbados were flooded as Beryl passed nearby; other damage included roofs, trees, and electrical posts. The most significant impacts occurred along the coast, which was pummeled severely by storm surge. Approximately 90% of the nation's fishing fleet was damaged or destroyed. The recovery of the fishing industry was led by Chief Fisheries Officer Shelly-Ann Cox. The Bridgetown Cruise Terminal also suffered damage. The cost of the damage caused by Beryl was estimated at B$193 million (US$96.5 million).

In Trinidad and Tobago, power outages occurred across Tobago, and water service was disrupted. On Trinidad, power outages occurred mainly on the northern and eastern parts of the island. Flooding also occurred on the northern half of Trinidad.

In Martinique, Électricité de France stated that 10,000 customers lost power. Heavy flooding was reported in downtown Fort-de-France.

In Saint Lucia, trees and powerlines were downed. Many homes made of weaker materials were damaged and multiple cows were killed. The initial assessment of infrastructure and agriculture damage in Saint Lucia is $2 million.

=== Colombia and Venezuela ===
Beryl's outer bands unleashed strong winds and torrential rains upon northeastern Venezuela, disrupting both air and maritime services. In the state of Sucre, six people were killed, while more than 6,000 houses were damaged. The city of Cumanacoa was flooded by rain dropped by Beryl, which caused the area's Manzanares River to overflow. Hundreds of families fled their homes on account of the flooding and landslides. Several officials, including Vice President Delcy Rodríguez, were injured by a falling tree during a tour of the damage in Cumanacoa.

While Beryl stayed well north of Colombia, there was one person reported missing due to high surf caused by the hurricane.

=== Greater Antilles ===
Beryl produced gusty winds and rough surf in the Dominican Republic. The hurricane displaced 89 people and cut service to 57 aqueducts. Large waves scattered debris on a section of the Las Américas Highway in Santo Domingo. Storm surge flooding was reported in the neighborhood of Ciudad Nueva, detouring traffic. Four dwellings were destroyed by storm surge in La Ciénaga, Barahona, where an additional three houses were damaged. A landslide destroyed a home in La Zurza. Multiple beachfront shops in Boca Chica were damaged by rough waves. The hurricane caused minimal damage in neighboring Haiti. Roads and agricultural lands along the southern coast were flooded. Fishing boats and other properties were also impacted.

Beryl brushed the southern coast of Jamaica on July 3, with strong winds and rain, causing significant damage to homes, crops and infrastructure. Four people were killed on the island. One woman died when she was struck by a falling tree, another man was killed when he was swept away by floodwaters, and a second man died a day after Beryl passed the island when a wall collapsed on him. Also, the body of an elderly woman was recovered from a pond on July 6. The Jamaican Public Service Company stated that over 400,000 people were without power. The storm’s center passed about 45 mi (72 km) from Kingston, where peak sustained winds of 48 mph (77 km/h) were recorded, with gusts up to 81 mph (130 km/h); rainfall of 10.60 in (269 mm) was recorded on the northeast side the city. A small portion of roof over a passenger boarding pier was damaged at the Norman Manley International Airport in Kingston. In Westmoreland, about 80 houses were destroyed. 13,500 houses were damaged by Beryl. Agricultural damages were estimated at $15.9 million. Total damage on the island reached J$32 billion (US$204 million).

Flash floods and mudslides were reported across the Cayman Islands as Beryl passed. The center of the storm passed just 40 mi (64 km) south of Grand Cayman Island. Nearly 6,000 on the island were affected by power outages. Peak sustained winds were measured at 44 mph (71 km/h) at Owen Roberts International Airport, with gusts up to 54 mph (87 km/h).

=== Mexico ===
Beryl brought heavy rains and high winds to Cancún and the Riviera Maya resort district along the Caribbean coast of Quintana Roo, resulting in downed trees and power lines, and damage to many roofs; there was also widespread flooding. Many areas lost electricity, including Tulum, Cozumel, and Islas Mujeres municipalities. Tourist infrastructure was without major damage. Beryl's high winds also resulted in fallen trees and power outages in Campeche, including Hopelchén Municipality.

Karen Clark & Company placed storm damage losses in Mexico at $90 million.

=== United States ===
The National Oceanic and Atmospheric Administration (NOAA) estimated the total cost in the United States to be $7.2 billion. Wind damage nationwide ranged from $2.5 billion to $3.5 billion, based on an estimate by CoreLogic. A prolific tornado outbreak spawned by Hurricane Beryl happened in eastern Texas, western Louisiana, and Arkansas on July 8. Overall, 113 tornado warnings were issued by the National Weather Service on July 8, the most for a single day in July, surpassing the 67 issued on July 6, 2005, which were related to Hurricane Cindy. The outbreak continued into July 9 with more tornadoes being confirmed, before impacting the interior Northeastern United States and Ontario on July 10. In all, 71 tornadoes were confirmed.

President Joe Biden approved a federal disaster declaration on July 2, for parts of Texas hit by the storm. Louisiana Governor Jeff Landry declared a state of emergency in areas there impacted.

Due to the impact of the storm in Texas, Amtrak canceled the July 10 runs of the Sunset Limited in its entirety in both directions and had the train run only from San Antonio, Texas, to Los Angeles, California, and vice versa until the July 17 westbound run.

==== Texas ====
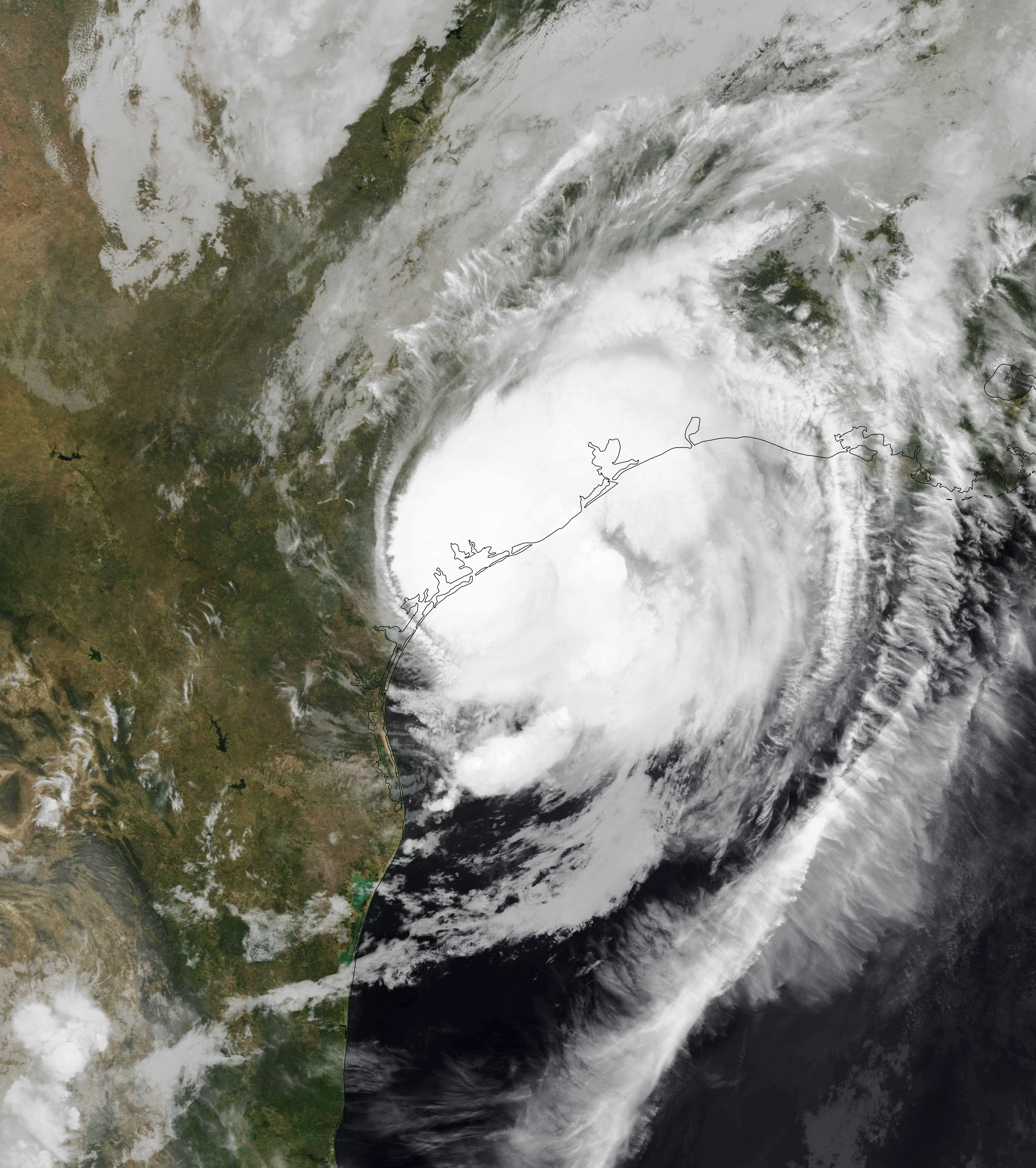
Beryl making landfall on July 8, 2024

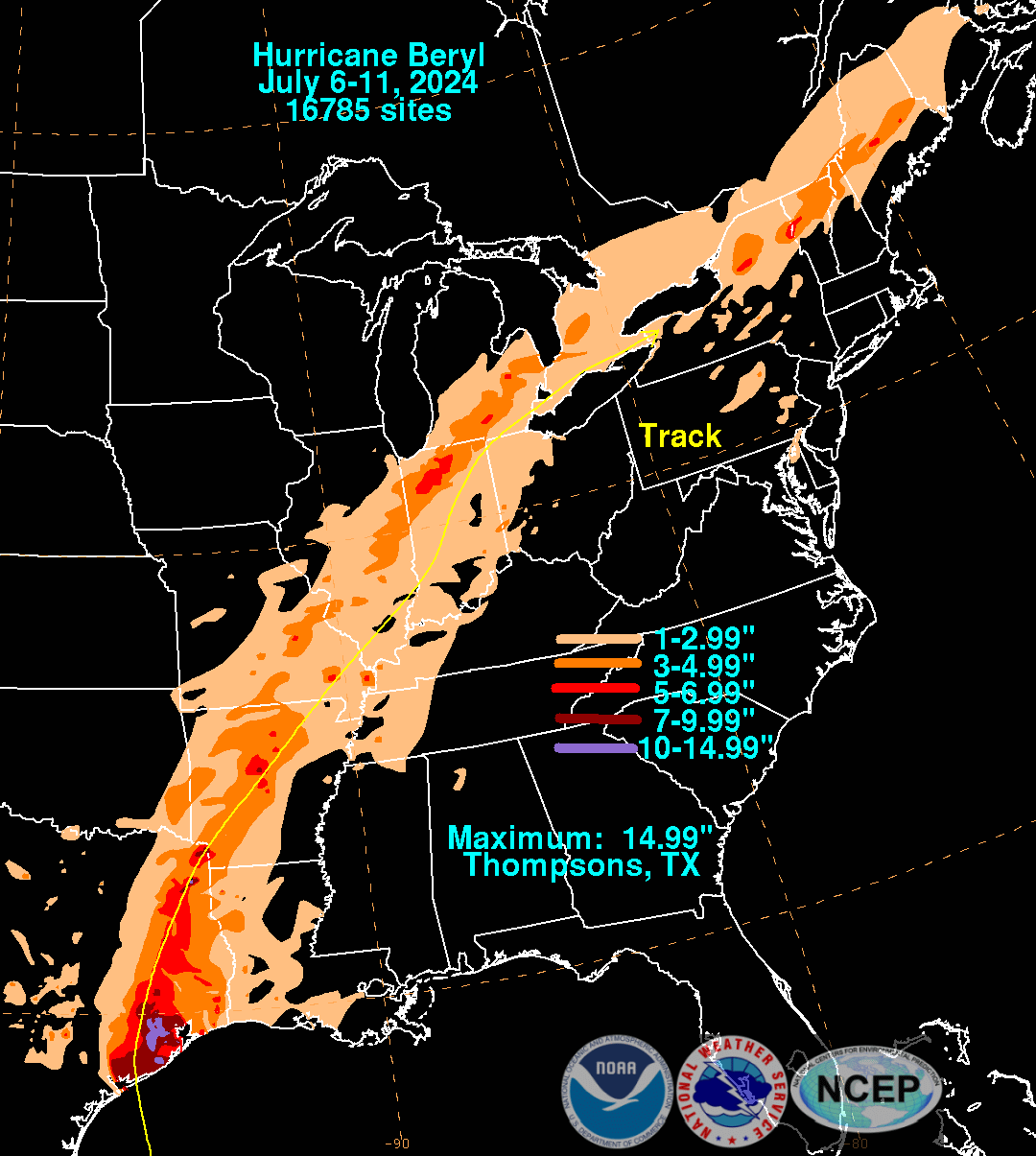
Rainfall map of Beryl in the US and Canada.

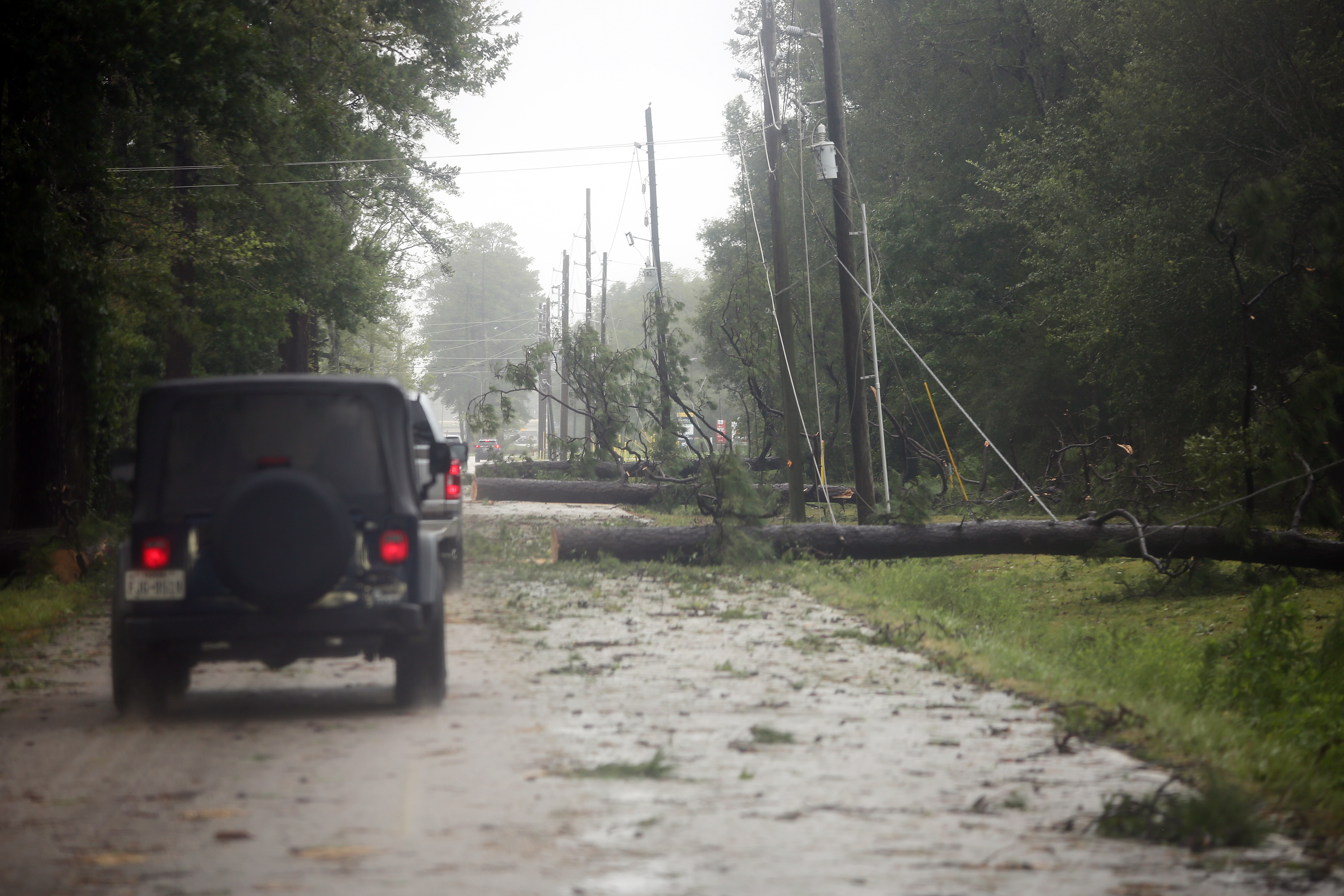
Downed trees and power lines in the New Caney area

Hurricane Beryl made landfall near Matagorda, Texas on July 8, 2024, causing 44 deaths due to strong winds and heavy rainfall knocking over trees and causing drownings. Hurricane Beryl was also significant for causing over 2.7 million households and businesses near the Gulf Coast, primarily in the Houston metropolitan area, to suffer from prolonged power outages during high temperatures and high humidity. The post-storm power outages played a contributing factor in at least ten deaths related to excess heat or nonfunctional medical equipment, bringing significant criticism towards the Houston-based utility company, CenterPoint Energy. The east side of the eyewall impacted Brazoria County. It produced wind gusts over 60–70 mph (97–113 km/h) with a peak gust of 97 mph (156 km/h) in Brazoria. Storm surge was 5–7 ft (1.5–2.1 m). Over 8 in (200 mm) of rain fell in and around Houston. Rainfall peaked in the Greater Houston at 14.99 in (381 mm) in Thompsons. Rainfall of 16.88 in (429 mm) was measured at a point 2.7 miles NNE of Hilshire Village, while parts of the Greater Houston area received 13.55 in (344 mm) of rain.

Storm surge at Surfside Beach reached between 3–7 feet (0.91–2.13 m), with several 18-wheeler trucks reported being flipped over in Freeport due to recorded wind gusts reaching up to 94 miles per hour. Several streets in Rosenberg were reported to be flooded, with great amounts of debris scattered. The greater Houston area received 10 inches of rain. A National Ocean Service station in Galveston Bay recorded sustained winds of 73 mph (117 km/h) with wind gusts of up to 82 mph (131 km/h), and with a peak gust of 97 mph (156 km/h) in Brazoria. A USGS river level gauge at Galveston Railroad Bridge recorded a 3.6 feet increase above its highest diurnal tidal level. Strong winds tore windows and window frames out of the walls of a hotel in Galveston.

There were 16 confirmed tornadoes in the state; another tornado tracked out of Louisiana and into Texas. An EF1 tornado caused considerable damage southwest of Jamaica Beach, while an EF2 tornado caused major damage on the west side of Jasper, injuring one person. A high-end EF1 tornado also moved through the town of Timpson, causing roads to become unpassable with one person being trapped. Two EF0 tornadoes and 11 other EF1 tornadoes were also confirmed in the state; the tornado that tracked into Texas out of Louisiana was rated EF1 as well and caused an injury near Bethany.

Significant impacts from Beryl took place in Surfside Beach, where siding was completely ripped off from the second story of a house. Multiple A frame homes along the beach were mostly destroyed as a result of Beryl's winds. Numerous other structures suffered extensive damage within the town. In Lake Jackson, Beryl's winds peeled back roofs, knocked down chimneys, and destroyed exterior brick facades.

Federal Emergency Management Agency (FEMA) provided federal disaster aid for 67 counties. On July 10, nineteen shelters housing 641 occupants were set up by FEMA, while about twenty cooling centers were established to mitigate heat-related symptoms. 160 boil water notices were issued for twelve counties.

Houston's NRG Stadium suffered from roof damage, with strong winds causing a hole to form between a groove in the retractable roof. Severe weather forced George Bush Intercontinental Airport to delay 117 flights and cancel 312 flights, while William P. Hobby Airport delayed 56 flights and canceled eight. At least one break room and one elevator were damaged during the storm at George Bush Intercontinental Airport.

Due to the impact of the storm in Texas, Amtrak canceled the July 10 runs of the Sunset Limited in its entirety in both directions and had the train run only from San Antonio, Texas, to Los Angeles, California, and vice versa until the July 17 westbound run.

On July 9 the Federal Emergency Management Agency (FEMA) declared Texas a disaster area.

===== Casualties =====
USCG Air Station Corpus Christi conducts an overflight along the Texas coast to assess the damage from Beryl

11 direct deaths were reported in Texas. 34 indirect deaths were reported. 14 of them were due to heat-induced hyperthermia caused by widespread electrical outages. One death was due to a fall in a home after an electrical outage, and one was due to an electrical outage causing a breathing machine to fail. Six deaths were related to post-storm tree-trimming or clearing, while two others were due to carbon monoxide poisoning. A 53-year-old man was killed in Humble after an oak tree fell into the house with the man and his family inside, crushing the man underneath structural debris. The other occupants of the house were unharmed. A 74-year-old woman was also killed when a tree fell into her room in the Ponderosa Forest neighborhood north of Houston. A woman in her mid-50s was killed when lightning ignited her house in southeast Houston. A Houston Police Department civilian employee was killed after his car was submerged on Houston Avenue near I-45. Two people drowned in Fort Bend County, and a man was killed by a tree falling on his tractor in New Caney. One person was killed in a marine boating incident.

At least 22 people were killed in the Houston area from damages caused by Hurricane Beryl. Of these, three people were killed after being struck by falling trees and two people drowned from flood waters. One person killed by a falling tree was a 53-year-old man struck while sheltering in his home in Humble in Harris County, while 73-year-old Maria Laredo was struck and killed in her home at nearby northern Harris County. Another man was killed by a falling tree while using a tractor to remove debris off the road in New Caney. One person was killed in Southeast Houston by a fire possibly caused by a lightning strike during the storm. An elderly woman in Fort Bend County became disoriented after walking out into the storm, causing her to fall into a pool and drown. Houston Police Department Information Security Officer Russell Richardson drowned at the Houston Avenue underpass after being trapped and submerged by flood waters in his vehicle while driving to work. A 77-year-old man drowned after trying to drive over a curb on a bridge over White Oak Bayou to avoid flood waters, whose current pushed the car on its side and submerged it. Three people died in Galveston County, two from carbon monoxide poisoning while operating generators. A 71-year-old woman near Crystal Beach in the Bolivar Peninsula succumbed to a lack of oxygen due to power outages causing her oxygen machine's batteries to run out. Two more people died in Harris County due to carbon monoxide poisoning while running generators in their homes.

At least seven deaths in Texas, including six deaths in Harris County, were caused by heat illness due to power outages preventing the use of air conditioning during a severe heat wave that saw temperatures rise to over 100°F for several days following Beryl's initial impact. Three more deaths were caused by complications related to power outages, of which two in Galveston were caused by heat-exacerbated cardiovascular disease.

===== Power outages =====
As Beryl tracked into Texas, Houston was directly impacted by Beryl's eyewall. More than 2.7 million households and businesses lost power as Beryl's eyewall struck Houston, striking down at least ten transmission towers and destroying or knocking over large numbers of power lines in the area. Of those, 2.2 million were customers of Houston-headquartered utility company CenterPoint, making up 80% of electricity utility customers in the Houston region. Power outages persisted for over 1.6 million households and businesses on the evening of July 10, 1.3 million of whom received power from CenterPoint, which provided power to Houston for over 100 years. Only about 200,000 CenterPoint customers had power return after July 9.

CenterPoint’s Outage Tracker was taken offline in May 2024 due to a derecho striking the Houston area, which remained down after Beryl struck and gave customers no gauge on when or where power would return. CenterPoint stated in a July 7 email that it planned to replace its Outage Tracker with “a redesigned cloud-based platform” that could take in more web traffic, while still not giving current and detailed information to customers. This caused many Houston residents to resort to using the Whataburger app's location services to indirectly determine which areas in Houston still did not have power based on if local locations were reported unavailable for service.

The power outages and resulting lack of air conditioning significantly exacerbated the effects of hot temperatures and high humidity creating triple digit heat indexes across the greater Houston. The National Weather Service instituted a heat advisory across southeastern Texas on July 9, warned Texans that heat indexes could reach 106 °F (41 °C) posed a significant health risk. Ford Motor reported a 1,300% increase in F-150 mobile generator use in the Houston area.

The combined power outages and excessive heat caused "countless" families to have their food spoil in powerless fridges which in addition to several stores suffering from power outages caused a significant food shortage, requiring food banks to distribute food across multiple underserved regions. Many residents waited in long lines at gas stations for generator fuel, while more long lines sprouted up at facilities with air conditioning. 29% of Greater Houston cell sites were down on July 9, with just under 20% down on July 10.

A house burned down shortly after its household reported a downed power line, with messages stating that utility company did not respond and that the fire company stated they were unable to help. Catholic workers in the Galveston-Houston Archdiocese were unable to provide aid following the storm due to power outages impacting their technical and staffing programs, while Knights of Columbus reported communication and internet difficulties.

===== Healthcare =====
Multiple hospitals had to limit power usage to essential equipment, with several hospitals overcrowding with patients. Multiple senior nursing homes were unable to receive power for oxygen machines, including Ella Springs senior living facility despite being listed as a "critical load customer" with 85 residents. Animal rescue operations also ran out of power, jeopardizing the health of many rescue dogs. Hospitals received dozens of patients suffering from heat-related symptoms, and were required to discharge those patients whose homes were lacking power or air conditioning to a large sports complex with working air conditioning instead.

At least six deaths in Harris County were directly traced to heat illnesses caused by a prolonged heat wave significantly exacerbated by the lack of power in the region.

===== Economic damages =====
Power outages hindered operations and transport at liquefied natural gas company Freeport LNG. Several ports and refineries were damaged by the storm, requiring operation and transit restrictions at Port Freeport. Eight public vessel terminals were temporarily shut down at the Port of Houston. The Port of Galveston recorded minor damage and power outages in several areas of the port and in the city of Galveston, causing a temporary halt in operations.

Estimates made by The Perryman Group made preliminary estimates of ~USD$1.5 billion losses in damages caused by the storm itself, and estimated long-term economic losses of "$4.6 billion in total expenditures, $2.0 billion in gross product, and $1.3 billion in earnings".

==== Louisiana ====
Radar loop of multiple tornadoes forming over Louisiana as Hurricane Beryl moved inland on July 8

Storm surge peaked at 3.2 ft (0.98 m) at Freshwater Lock. Sustained winds of 44 mph (70 km/h) was reported in Cameron. In Cameron Parish, portions of LA 27 and LA 82 alongside some roads in Lake Charles saw debris and heavy rainfall due to Beryl. Minor flooding was reported in New Orleans. As the storm traveled inland, it brought severe weather to the northwestern side of the state, with several tornado warnings and power outages; There were 27 confirmed tornadoes in the state, including multiple large and long-tracked tornadoes. Six EF2 tornadoes were also confirmed, with one of them striking Pleasant Hill before causing additional damage north of the town. Unrelated to the tornado to the east of the town, a natural gas leak occurred on LA 174. Another EF2 tornado that injured a person west of Union Springs. Another large, low-end EF2 tornado tracked over 50 mi (80 km) passing through Barksdale Air Force Base, and killing a woman and injuring her two children east of Benton when it knocked a tree down onto her mobile home. Three EFU tornadoes, three EF0 tornadoes, and 15 other EF1 tornadoes were also confirmed in the state, including the aforementioned EF1 tornado that caused an injury and crossed the state line into Texas and two other EF1 tornadoes that crossed into Arkansas. Over 20,000 SWEPCO customers lost power in Northwestern Louisiana.

==== Mississippi Valley ====
Arkansas was battered by rain as Beryl moved through as a tropical depression. The highest rainfall total in the state was 8 in (200 mm) in Ico in Grant County. Areas in the Little Rock metropolitan area in Pulaski County received over 2 in (51 mm) of rain with the peak total being 7.31 in (186 mm) in the Ferndale area. Although it had weakened, wind gusts up to tropical storm force were recorded in the state. The peak recorded gust was 47 mph (76 km/h) in Doddridge. In Philadelphia, trees were uprooted with some snapped. In Camden, power lines and power poles were blown down. Many tornado warnings were issued in the state as well; six EF1 tornadoes and two EF0 tornadoes were confirmed; two other EF1 tornadoes tracked out of Louisiana and into Arkansas. Almost 14,000 Arkansans were without power. An EF1 tornado was also confirmed in Mississippi.

A flood watch was in effect in Missouri for the Mississippi and Missouri Rivers, and other parts of the state, including near the Lake of the Ozarks. The baseball game between St. Louis Cardinals and the Kansas City Royals was rescheduled due to rainfall from Beryl. St. Louis saw flooding and heavy rainfall.

==== Ohio Valley ====
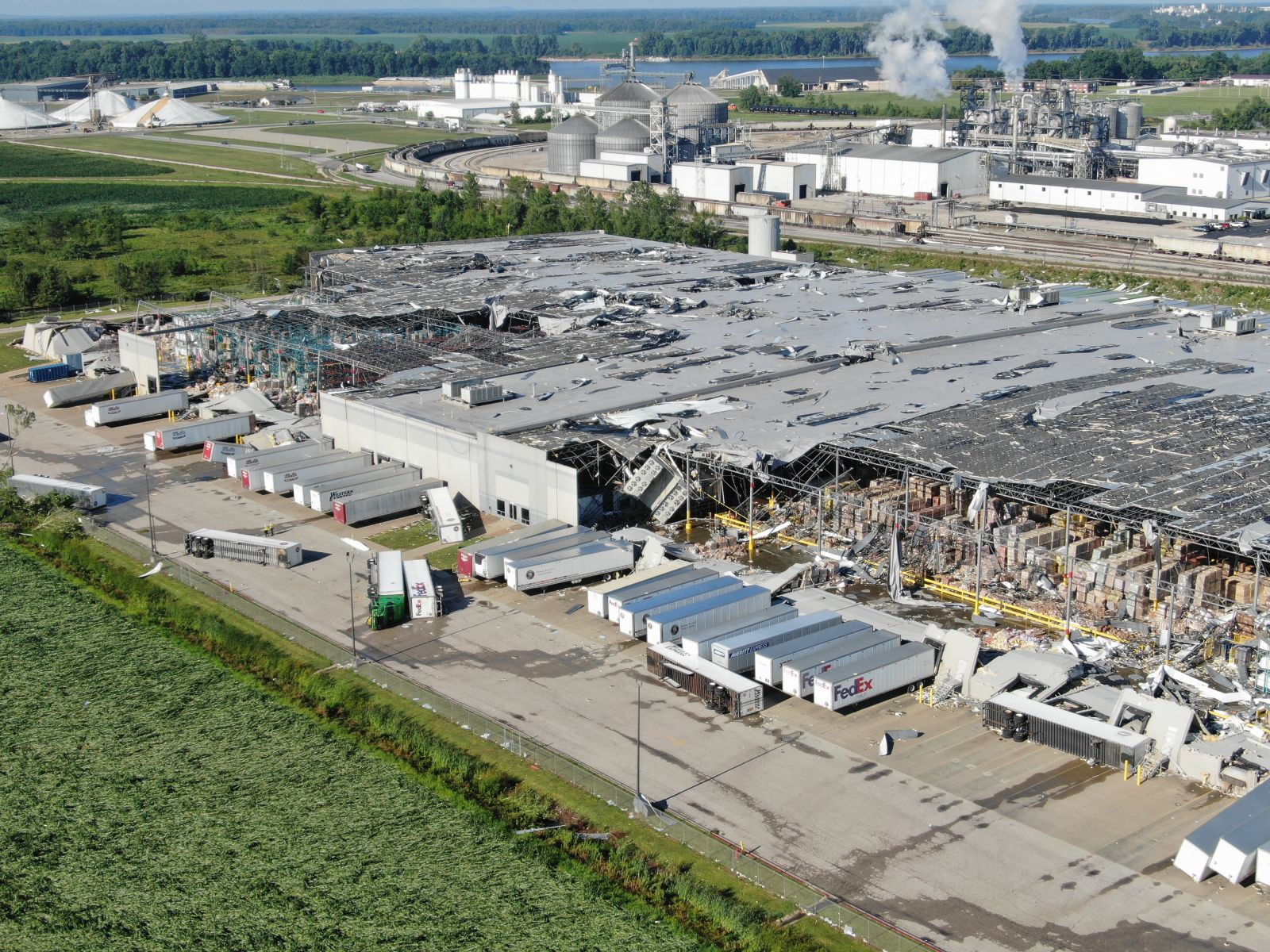
Damage to a Kenco facility in Mount Vernon, Indiana, caused by EF3 tornado spawned by the remnants of Beryl

Northern Indiana received over 4 in (100 mm) of rain from Beryl. On July 9, the remnants of Hurricane Beryl spawned a long-tracked supercell that produced six tornadoes in western Kentucky and southwestern Indiana. The first two tornadoes touched down in Kentucky, both of which caused EF1 damage. After crossing the Ohio River in Indiana the storm spawned a low-end EF3 tornado that heavily damaged an industrial area and derailed a train on the east side of Mount Vernon, Indiana. This tornado tracked north almost 35 mi (56 km) through Posey County into Gibson County, where it lifted near Johnson, Indiana. The storm later produced two EF1 tornadoes and an EF2 tornado as well. Separate storms also produced an EFU tornado near Burns City, produced EF0 tornadoes near Dubre, Kentucky, and Shoals, Indiana, and an EF1 tornado near Snake Run. Several tornado watches were issued in addition to flood warnings, watches, and advisories due to heavy rainfall across the Ohio Valley. In Illinois, gusts of up to 40 mph (64 km/h) were felt in the central region of the state. The highest gusts of 45 mph (72 km/h) were felt at the Coles County Memorial Airport. The NWS issued widespread flood watches and warnings. Many fields, especially in the southern portion of the state, were inundated with floods. About 2–4 in (51–102 mm) of rain fell in the state.

==== Great Lakes ====
As the storm's remnants moved over the Lower Peninsula of Michigan late that day and into the next day, 34 counties were put under a flood watch and eight under a flood advisory. Heavy rainfall in Southwest and Central Michigan resulted in localized flash flooding, power outages, and minor storm damage. Beryl's rainfall in Michigan peaked at 6.74 in (171 mm) at a station near Burton, which became the state's wettest tropical cyclone on record since 1900.

FEMA declared New York a disaster area. In Western New York, 25,000 customers lost power; seven tornadoes were also confirmed in the state, including a low-end EF2 tornado that destroyed multiple farm buildings near Eden. Three of the other tornadoes were rated EF1, two were rated EF0, and one was rated EFU. Lowville, New York, recorded 6.02 in (153 mm) of rain, which broke the record for a single day rainfall total.

==== New England ====
FEMA declared New Hampshire and Vermont a disaster area. Vermont was hit with severe flooding due to Beryl's remnants, wiping away bridges and severely damaging homes. Over 100 people in the state required rescuing due to the storm. Montpelier was the hardest hit area, with over 6 inches (150 mm) of rain. A man in his UTV was swept off the road and killed in the town of Peacham. Another man died in Lyndonville, while attempting to drive through flood waters. In Plainfield, an apartment building was completely wiped away by floodwaters, and a car was swept away into the water.

Towns in northern New Hampshire were severely damaged, while roads were damaged and some bridges. Due to the flooding, around 20 people were left stranded at a Walmart in Littleton and required rescuing. Monroe, Dalton, and Littleton were among the damaged towns.

=== Canada ===
The remnants of Beryl brought torrential rainfall to southern Ontario on July 10, and into the next morning, causing localized flooding. It also put an end to a persistent heat wave, ending a heat warning for the Greater Toronto Area. Additionally, two weak EF0 tornadoes occurred in the London, Ontario, area; damage from tornadoes was limited to crops and trees.

In southwest Quebec, up to 3.9 in (100 mm) of rain was reported in parts of Montreal on July 10. Several highways, including the Decarie Expressway, were temporarily shut down that afternoon as a result of the deluge, which also flooded local streets and basements. Further, over 9,000 Hydro-Québec customers in the Montréal and Montérégie regions were without power.

Beryl's remnant moisture pushed through Nova Scotia on July 11, causing some localized flash flooding and washed out roads. In the Annapolis Valley, over 3.9 in (100 mm) of rain fell within a few hours. Four counties in western Nova Scotia were put under a flash flood alert late that day. In Wolfville, a youth was swept into a ditch and drowned.

== Aftermath ==
After the hurricane passed the Caribbean, the United Nations authorized $4 million in aid, Grenada and Saint Vincent and the Grenadines getting $1.5 million and Jamaica receiving $2.5 million. The Government of Canada announced it would provide $1.2 million in humanitarian assistance. The United States Agency for International Development announced $4.5 million in humanitarian aid for countries affected by Beryl, including $2.5 million for Jamaica. The European Union authorized $450,000 in humanitarian aid for countries in the Lesser Antilles. The World Food Programme mobilized 5,000 food kits for affected countries in the Caribbean, and provided $219 million to 11,500 persons in Jamaica. The United Nations Children’s Fund (UNICEF) provided $42.75 million in support for 7,000 households in Jamaica. Persons with severely damaged households were granted $150,000, while those with minor damage were awarded $50,000. Residents whose houses were destroyed were granted $200,000.

The Royal Navy sent a warship with supplies to the Cayman Islands.

Leaders from Antigua and Barbuda, Saint Vincent and the Grenadines, and Grenada signed a letter requesting for debt cancellation and a program to be formed to increase funding after natural disasters. Saint Vincent struggled hosting people from its outer islands that evacuated due to Beryl.

In Barbados, fiberglass fabricator Fiberpol and the Rotary Clubs of Barbados donated a combined $40,000 to help repair the fishing fleet; most of the boats were not insured.

=== Texas ===
In the wake of Beryl, more than 200 restaurants in the Houston area sued CenterPoint Energy, amounting to over $100 million, they alleged that CenterPoint's "gross failure in communication and management" caused them to lose customers due to the power being out. On July 22, several Houston beauty, health, and medical sued CenterPoint Energy for "gross negligence", seeking $100 million.

==== Aftermath ====
CenterPoint regulatory policy vice president Brad Tutunjian defended the gradual pace of CenterPoint's revival of the power grid by stating that restoring power for over one million customers was "a monumental number". He stated that the biggest difficulty was restoring power to lines and towers destroyed or damaged by fallen trees or branches. When press reporters questioned why CenterPoint wasn't more vigilant about trimming branches or putting more power lines underground, Tutunjian stated the company put many power lines underground over decades. He denied suggestions to employ third-party workers to stay in the storm in order to get power running quicker as unsafe. CenterPoint reported that most of its 12,000 recovery workers brought in to respond Hurricane Beryl were mobilized to near the Texas-Mexico border along the Gulf Coast based on earlier hurricane track predictions. CenterPoint claimed that its electricity system mostly operated "as intended" during Hurricane Beryl, with mostly electricity poles and wires being taken down instead of transmission towers or substations.

Texas Governor Greg Abbott decried the frequency of power grid failures in Texas due to severe weather while on an "economic development" trip in Asia, and stated that he would employ the Texas Public Utility Commission to research and investigate the reason for the power grid failures in addition to utility companies' preparations and responses to Beryl. Acting Governor Dan Patrick called the power outages the longest that Houston ever faced while stating that CenterPoint was responsible for its power grid failures, saying that the company "will have to answer for themselves" on if they were prepared or not. He also accused U.S. President Joe Biden of not reaching out quick enough following the disaster, of cutting down his aid request for 121 counties to 67, and of retracting Emergency Disaster Declaration funds after granting them by mistake, which Patrick claimed was responsible for recovery delays. He further claimed that Biden and the federal government were either incompetent or deliberately lying and "weaponing" the federal emergency response to make it appear as he and Greg Abbott were not doing their jobs well. The Harris County Republican Party disparaged CenterPoint for being "underprepared" despite being Harris County's primary electricity provider.

Biden gave condolences to Houston Mayor John Whitmire to people who lost their lives in the storm, and stated that FEMA and the US Coast Guard were ready to be mobilized to wherever they were needed.

Former engineer and senior advisor to Consolidated Edison Wei Du stated that a Category 1 hurricane causing over one million power outages indicated a significant need for "resiliency hardening investments". Carnegie Mellon University Institute for Energy Innovation leader Costa Samaras emphasized the risk to vulnerable people caused by power outages, requiring power grids to be able to withstand multiple concurrent climate-amplified severe weather events in order to protect lives. Sierra Club director Dave Cortez called Houston's power grid "20th century infrastructure in a 21st century climate crisis".

==== Recovery ====
By the end of August 2024, the city of Houston had established regimented debris removal and infrastructure assessments in order to continuously rebuild the city after Hurricane Beryl. This was done through a series of mediated cleanup passes, implemented to aid the community and provide needed relief. According to the Houston Solid Waste Management Department, more than 1.7 million cubic yards of debris were collected during the first cleanup phase. This number would later grow to over 4.7 million yards, eventually removed after multiple passes.

Earlier that month, the city council of Houston Texas, approved a $314 million recovery plan with the fund necessary for debris removal, public safety, emergency power, and housing repairs. Funding was supported in part by the US Department of Housing and Urban Development which included $100 million for residential repairs. The State of Texas also contributed $50 million in emergency funds for cleanup in counties impacted by Beryl.

As of October 2025, recovery continues. A survey by Rice University found that one in eight residents still reported ongoing disruption from Beryl. Around 40% of those living within Greater Houston reported a desire to leave due to 2024 weather disasters. Efforts continue to strengthen infrastructure resilience in the wake of Beryl’s destruction.

== Retirement ==
Due to the widespread destruction and fatalities it caused, the World Meteorological Organization retired the name Beryl in April 2025 and it will not be used again in the North Atlantic basin. It was replaced with Brianna, which will first appear on the 2030 season list.

== See also ==
- Weather of 2024
- Tropical cyclones in 2024
- List of Category 5 Atlantic hurricanes
- List of Texas hurricanes (1980–present)
