= Hurricane Nicholas =

Category 1 Atlantic hurricane in 2021

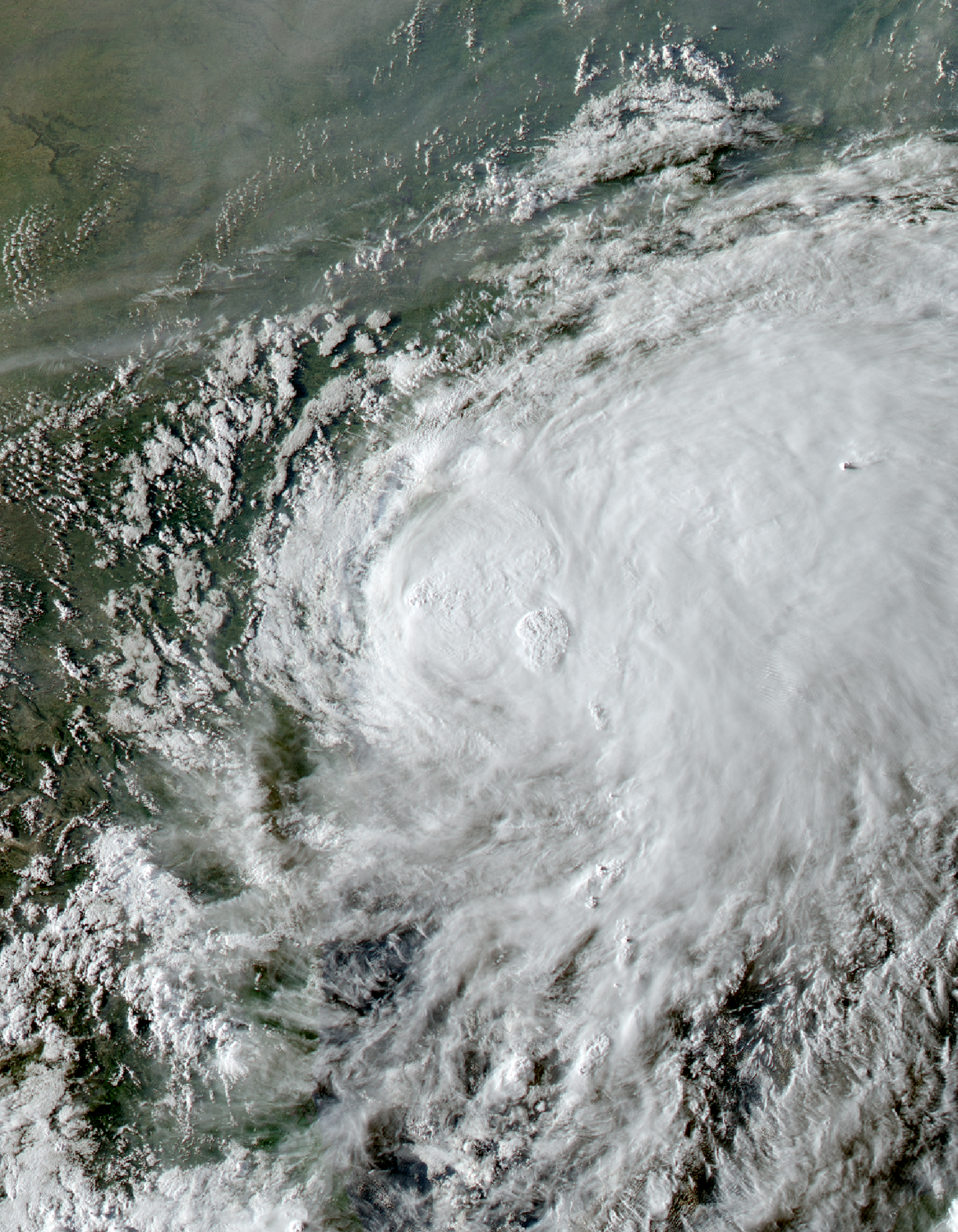
- Hurricane Nicholas at peak intensity approaching Texas shortly before September 14

Meteorological history
- Formed: September 12, 2021
- Post-tropical: September 15, 2021
- Dissipated: September 20, 2021

Category 1 hurricane
- 1-minute sustained (SSHWS/NWS)
- Highest winds: 75 mph (120 km/h)
- Lowest pressure: 988 mbar (hPa); 29.18 inHg

Overall effects
- Fatalities: 2 direct, 2 indirect
- Damage: $1.1 billion (2021 USD)
- Areas affected: Yucatán Peninsula, Tamaulipas, Gulf Coast of the United States
- IBTrACS
- Part of the 2021 Atlantic hurricane season

Hurricane Nicholas was a slow-moving and erratic tropical cyclone that made landfall in the U.S. state of Texas in mid-September 2021. The fourteenth named storm and sixth hurricane of the 2021 Atlantic hurricane season, Nicholas originated from a tropical wave that emerged off the west coast of Africa on August 28. The system developed into a tropical storm on September 12, with the National Hurricane Center (NHC) naming the cyclone Nicholas. Nicholas gradually intensified initially, due to adverse effects of strong wind shear. However, late on September 13, Nicholas began intensifying at a faster rate, and at 03:00 UTC on September 14, Nicholas intensified into a Category 1 hurricane, with maximum sustained winds of 75 mph (121 km/h) and a minimum central pressure of 988 mbar (29.2 inHg). At 5:30 UTC on the same day, Nicholas made landfall in Texas at peak intensity. Afterward, the system gradually weakened, weakening into a tropical storm several hours later, and weakening further into a tropical depression on the next day. The system proceeded to drift slowly over Louisiana. On September 15, Nicholas degenerated into a remnant low, before being absorbed into another extratropical system on September 20.

The storm brought heavy rainfall and storm surge to parts of Texas and Louisiana. Some of the affected areas were still recovering from the effects of Hurricane Ida, which impacted the Gulf Coast of the United States a few weeks prior. Hurricane Nicholas caused four deaths and $1.1 billion in damage.

== Meteorological history ==
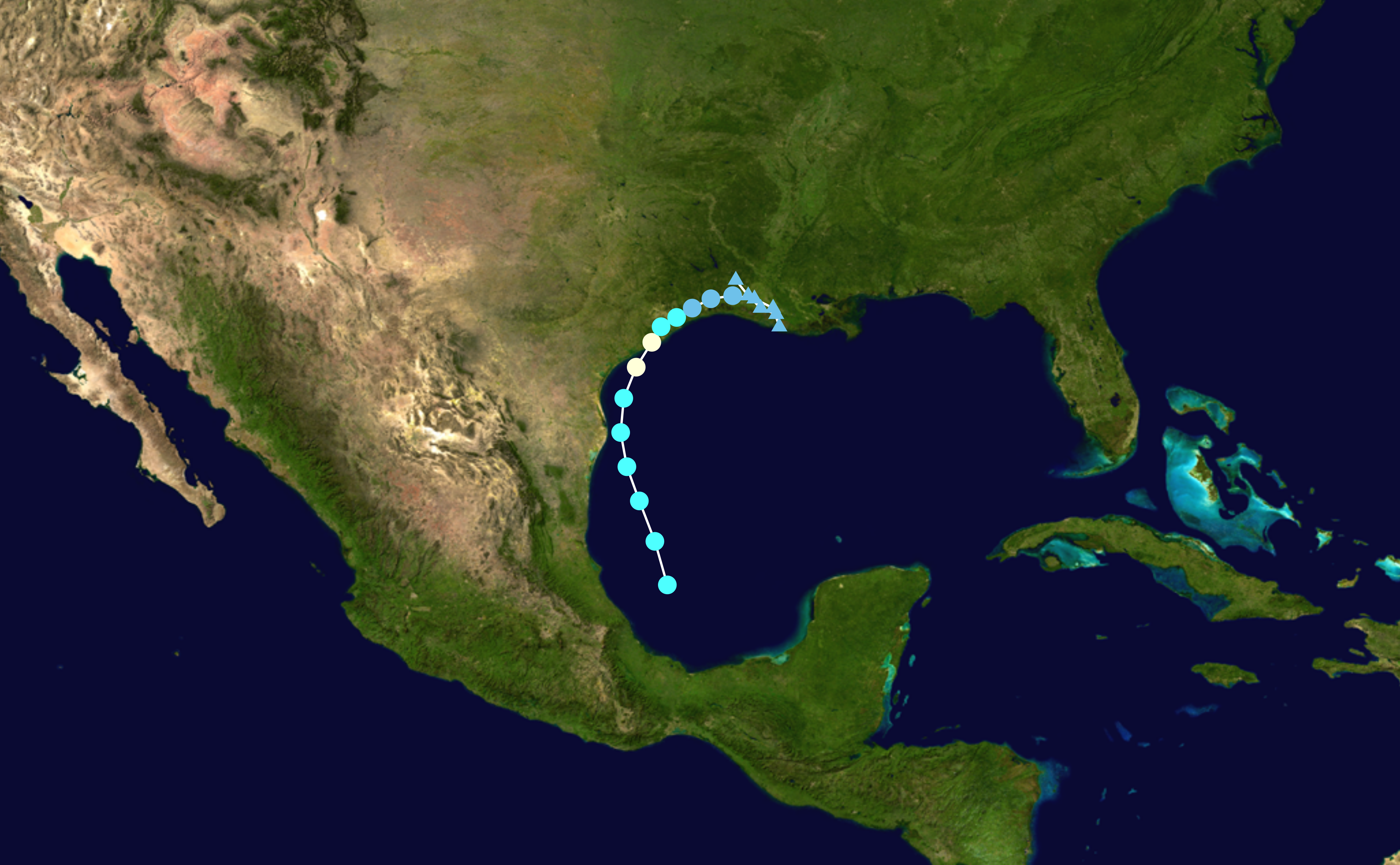
Map plotting the storm's track and intensity, according to the Saffir–Simpson scale Map key Saffir–Simpson scale Tropical depression (≤38 mph, ≤62 km/h) Tropical storm (39–73 mph, 63–118 km/h) Category 1 (74–95 mph, 119–153 km/h) Category 2 (96–110 mph, 154–177 km/h) Category 3 (111–129 mph, 178–208 km/h) Category 4 (130–156 mph, 209–251 km/h) Category 5 (≥157 mph, ≥252 km/h) Unknown Storm type Tropical cyclone Subtropical cyclone Extratropical cyclone, remnant low, tropical disturbance, or monsoon depression

On August 28, a tropical wave moved off the west coast of Africa. It moved steadily westward over the next week, producing only disorganized convection before moving into and through the Caribbean Sea. At 06:00 UTC on September 9, the National Hurricane Center (NHC) began to monitor the northern portion the tropical wave over the western Caribbean Sea for potential development as it moved across northern Central America and the Yucatán Peninsula toward the Bay of Campeche. By the next day, the wave began to interact with a surface trough over the southern Gulf of Mexico, producing widespread but disorganized showers and thunderstorms across the region. Showers and thunderstorms associated with this system increased and become better organized on September 12, and its top sustained winds reached 40 mph (65 km/h) (tropical storm-force), as confirmed by an Air Force hurricane-hunter flight that morning. As a result, advisories were initiated at 15:00 UTC on Tropical Storm Nicholas.

The tropical wave that would become Nicholas shortly before forming on September 12.

After forming, the storm was found to be not very organized, as it lacked convective banding features. The center was also not well defined. After satellite imagery from radar and aircraft, it was found that the center had re-formed 150 nautical miles more north than expected and the storm had gained speed. The storm entered the southern part of a large area of deep convection, as signs of an eyewall structure forming were beginning to become prominent. The eyewall structure then dissipated and a new center began forming north-northeast of the previous. The storm then underwent a period of rapid intensification, the fifth hurricane of the season to do so, after intensifying by 35 mph (55 km/h) in a 24-hour period. Consequently, at 03:00 UTC on September 14, the system was upgraded to a Category 1 hurricane. Shortly thereafter, at 05:30 UTC, Nicholas made landfall about 10 mi (16 km) west-southwest of Sargent Beach, Texas, with maximum sustained winds of 75 mph (121 km/h). It then quickly weakened inland to tropical storm strength, as it moved to near Galveston Bay. Nicholas was downgraded to tropical depression status at 00:00 UTC on September 15, as it moved slowly into southern Louisiana, where residents were still recovering in the aftermath of Hurricane Ida. At the time, the system consisted of a large swirl of low- to mid-level clouds and showers, with a few patches of deep convection well removed from the center, according to the NHC. Early the following day, while situated near Marsh Island, along the Louisiana coast, Nicholas became post-tropical. Nicholas's remnant low later moved further inland, stalling over northern Louisiana, before its low-level circulation center became ill-defined on September 18. The storm's remnants persisted for another few days, before they were absorbed into an extratropical storm to the north on September 20. The system's residual tropical moisture lingered over parts of the southeastern U.S. for several days.

== Preparations ==
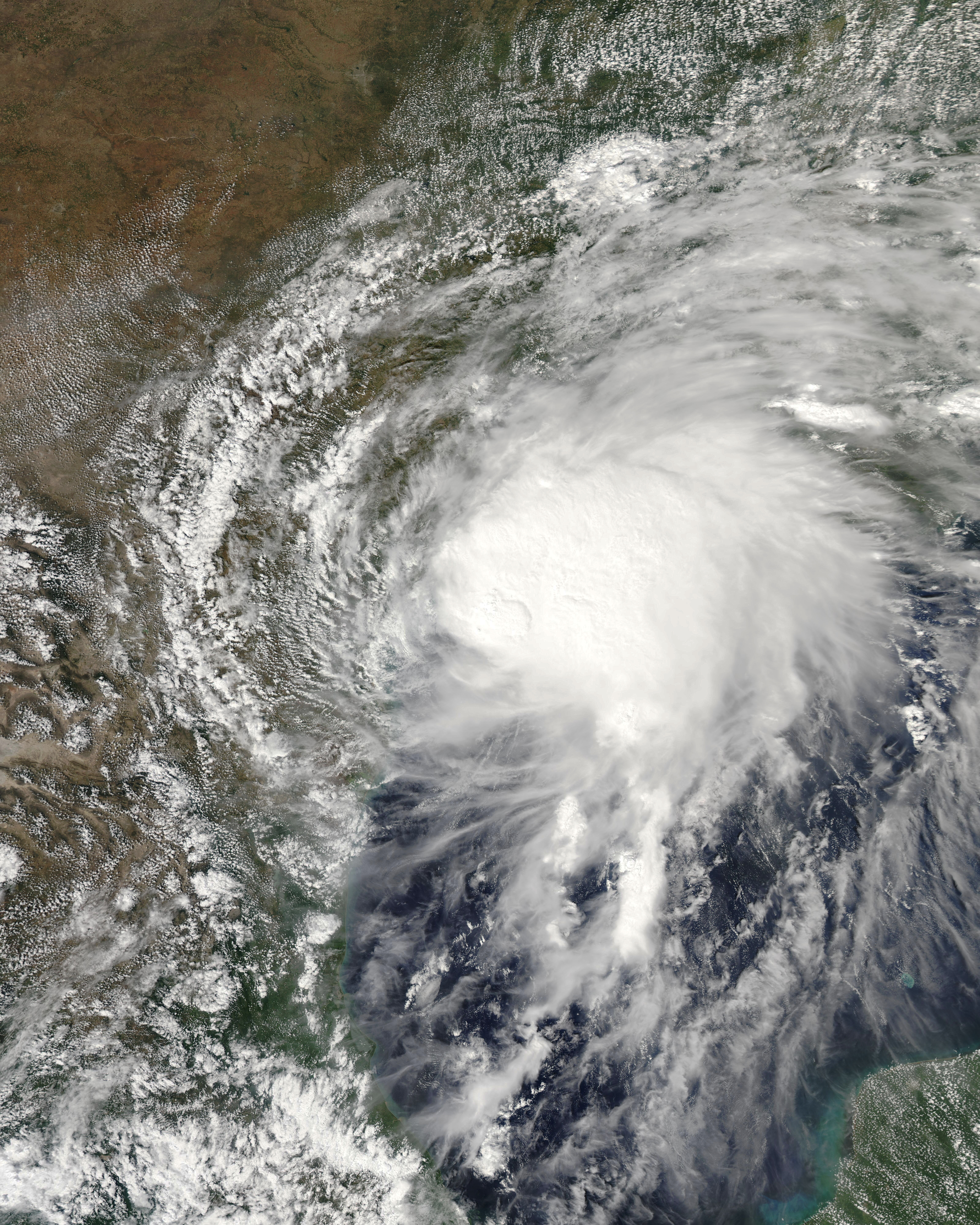
Nicholas nearing the coast of Texas on September 13.

When Tropical Storm Nicholas formed, tropical storm warnings were issued along the coast from Barra El Mezquital and north to Port Aransas, Texas. Additionally, tropical storm watches were called from Port Aransas to High Island, Texas. As Nicholas neared landfall, tropical storm alerts were issued for the entire Texas coast. The first hurricane warning was issued from Port O'Connor to Freeport, Texas at 03:00 UTC, when the storm was upgraded to a Category 1 hurricane. Flood watches were also issued in southern and central Louisiana when Nicholas slowed its forward speed to 5 miles per hour (8.0 km/h). In addition to flood watches, the Weather Prediction Center issued a rare 50 percent high-risk flooding area for southwestern Louisiana.

Rainfall estimate totals were 8 to 16 inches (200 to 410 mm), with some locations potentially receiving 15 inches (380 mm). Coastal Louisiana, which was battered by Hurricane Ida just weeks earlier, was estimated to receive 5 to 10 inches (130 to 250 mm). Lake Houston was lowered by one foot (30 cm). Schools in southern Texas and Louisiana were suspended on September 13. At least 330 flights originating from William P. Hobby Airport and George Bush Intercontinental Airport were cancelled. In Harris County, COVID-19 testing sites were closed. Late on September 13, ferry service between Galveston and the Bolivar Peninsula were suspended. Service resumed the next day.

Governor of Louisiana, John Bel Edwards, declared a state of emergency and noted that areas affected by Hurricane Ida would possibly feel the effects of the tropical storm. Edwards also requested a federal disaster declaration, which was approved by President Joe Biden on September 14. The Governor of Texas, Greg Abbott, issued a disaster declaration for 17 counties in southeastern Texas and ordered the State Operations Center to increase its readiness level. The Louisiana National Guard deployed 80 high water vehicles, 23 boats and 15 aircraft across southern Louisiana. On September 13, before the storm hit, singer-songwriter Harry Styles postponed his performance in Houston. Dozens of barriers were constructed in Houston and readied high-water rescue vehicles. The American Red Cross in the Texas Gulf Coast area prepared as Nicholas moved closer to landfall.

== Impact and aftermath ==
Losses in the United States ranged from $1.1 to $2.2 billion, according to an estimate by Risk Management (RMS). RMS estimated losses to the National Flood Insurance Program to be between $200 million and $500 million. Karen Clark & Co. estimated damage around $950 million.

=== Texas ===
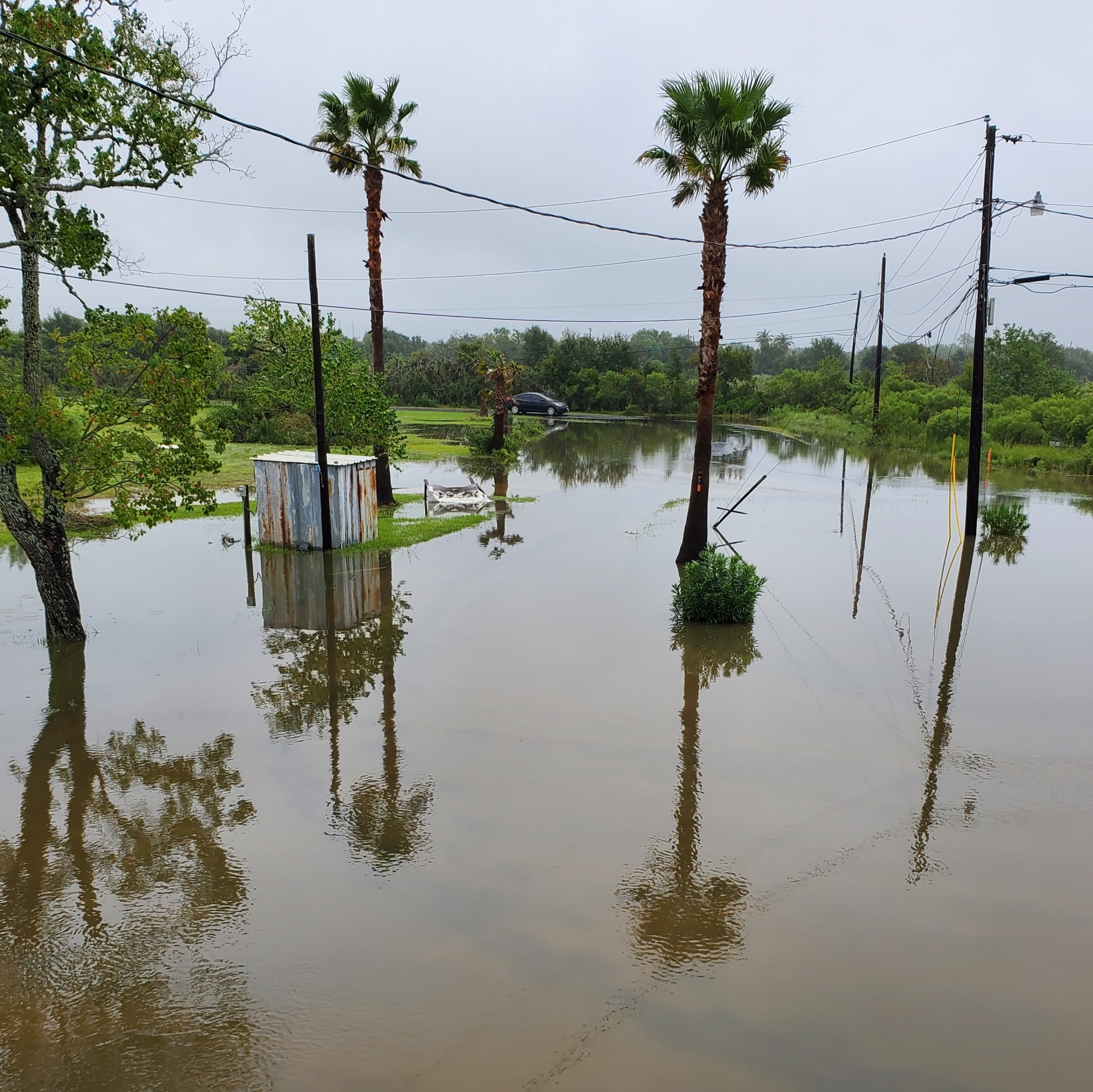
Coastal flooding in from Dickinson Bayou in Texas City, Texas after Nicholas

The storm left at least 503,000 without power in Texas, mostly in the Houston area. An estimated 33 percent of Galveston County residents were without power. Portions of the Strand Historic District in Galveston were left underwater. The Colonial Pipeline shut down two pipelines from Houston to North Carolina due to power outages. This shutdown occurred just two weeks after the same pipelines were shut down due to Hurricane Ida. In Seabrook, officials estimated that 30 homes sustained wind or flood damage. The Pine Gully fishing pier in the Pine Gully Park was destroyed by storm surge. City officials promised to work with the Federal Emergency Management Agency to rebuild the pier.

Deer Park, Texas recorded 9.83 inches (250 mm) of rain, while Beaumont, Texas recorded around 7 inches (180 mm), and Houston saw over 6 inches (150 mm). Storm surge in Port O'Connor was reported to be near 4 feet. A gas station had its roof blown off in Matagorda. Several roadways were closed due to flooding and debris, including a section of I-10 and Texas State Highway 225. Several highways in and near Clear Lake, League City, and Friendswood were inundated, including several lanes of Interstate 45. No injuries or deaths were reported due to the storm in Texas. In Pearland, 21 percent of the city was without power. Flash flood warnings were issued in Pasadena, League City, and Baytown.

=== Louisiana ===
The storm left at least 120,000 without power in Louisiana. Around 87,000 residents were still without power from Hurricane Ida when Nicholas made landfall. In the early morning hours of September 14, heavy rains had reached New Orleans and flood warnings were issued in the New Orleans area.

=== Elsewhere ===
The remnants of Nicholas contributed to two reported direct deaths that occurred in Alabama due to freshwater flooding. One was when a 40-year-old man was swept away in floodwaters in Tuscaloosa, and the other in Hazel Green when a 35-year-old man was pulled into a drainage pipe.

In Florida, two indirect deaths occurred due to rip currents from the storm's remnants in Panama City Beach where two males were swept out to sea. Additionally, a 60-year-old man was hospitalized in critical condition on 17 September as a result of the rip currents.

== See also ==
- Weather of 2021
- Tropical cyclones in 2021
- Other storms of the same name
- List of Texas hurricanes (1980–present)
- List of costliest Atlantic hurricanes
- Timeline of the 2021 Atlantic hurricane season
- List of Category 1 Atlantic hurricanes
