= List of storms named Nicholas =

The name Nicholas has been used for five tropical cyclones worldwide: twice in the Atlantic Ocean and three times in the Australian region.

In the Atlantic:

- Tropical Storm Nicholas (2003) – long-lived and erratic tropical storm
- Hurricane Nicholas (2021) – Category 1 hurricane that made landfall near Sargent, Texas, bringing heavy rainfall and storm surge to parts of the U.S. Gulf Coast

In the Australian region:

- Cyclone Nicholas (1985) – severe tropical cyclone that did not threaten land
- Cyclone Nicholas (1996) – made landfall west of Derby, Australia
- Cyclone Nicholas (2008) – made landfall north of Carnarvon, Australia

== See also ==
- Cyclone Niklas (2015) – a European windstorm with a similar name
