= Breakpoint (meteorology) =

Meteorology location

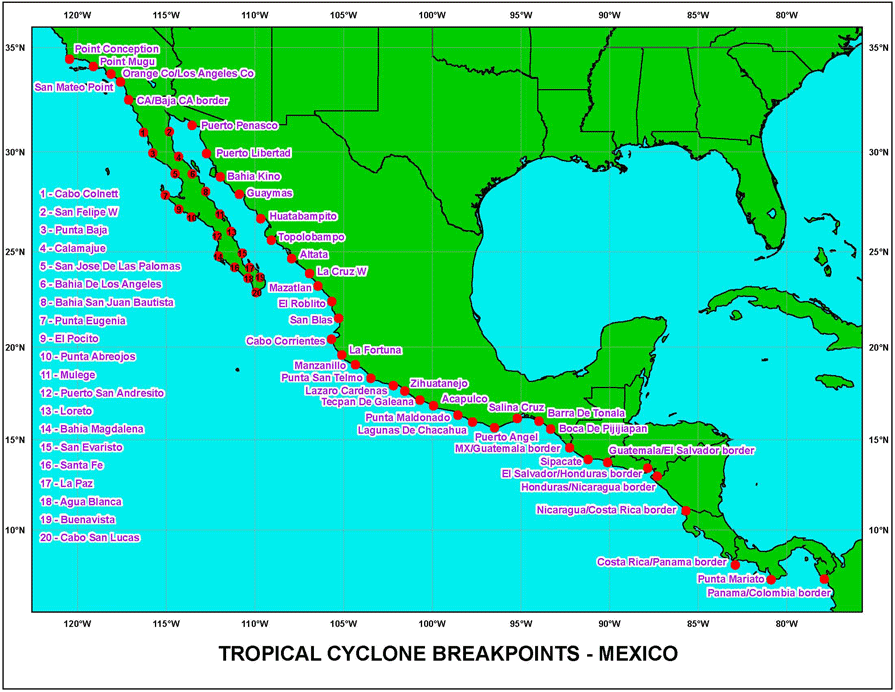
A map showing the NHC's breakpoints in the Eastern Pacific Ocean

A breakpoint is a location referred to by meteorologists when issuing watches, warnings, or advisories, for specific areas. Breakpoints are used when coastal and offshore areas need to be warned of an impending weather event, usually pertaining to a hazard faced because of the water.

Breakpoints are typically defined by the name of a place or town on the coast, by a geographic feature, or by some combination of latitude and longitude. Breakpoints are used by various meteorological organizations worldwide, including the National Hurricane Center (NHC), the Japan Meteorological Agency (JMA), and the National Weather Service (NWS).

== Use of breakpoints ==
Breakpoints, in general, are used to specify the endpoints of a region to be discussed by a meteorologist. While virtually any point can be used for informal discussions, a list of formal breakpoints is generally used for issuing warnings and forecasts for an area.

The National Hurricane Center has a list of both formal and informal breakpoints, which it uses throughout its areas of responsibility in the Eastern Pacific, and in the North Atlantic basins. All of these breakpoints are defined as points on the coastline, and are usually significant towns that are a reasonable distance apart, though the exact distance varies. The NHC's list of breakpoints is adhered to for the issuance of hurricane watches and warnings, for sections of coastline, though the forecasts and the informal discussions are not limited to using breakpoints as points of reference.

The NWS is similar to the NHC in its use of breakpoints, in that the breakpoints are used for the issuance of watches and warnings, though beyond that the NWS is stricter in its use of breakpoints. In general, the breakpoints used by the NWS are a combination of latitude or longitude points (such as 35N), and geographical features (such as Hatteras Canyon). The NWS breakpoints are also significantly fewer and spread out, resulting in a larger distance between the breakpoints. The NWS issues forecasts for the area between each breakpoint, defining each as a forecast zone. In general, the NWS's breakpoints serve almost solely as endpoints to the zones, as watches, warnings, and forecasts are all issued for each zone between consecutive breakpoints.

The use as breakpoints comes into play when consecutive zones are being discussed, in which the breakpoints at the end of the entire region can be used. The JMA is similar to the NWS in forecasts and most warnings are issued by zone, though tropical cyclone warnings are issued differently. Like the NHC, the JMA issues most of its tropical cyclone advisories for a section of coast, usually chosen to coincide with the zone endpoints, creating a system of breakpoints and a warning methodology, similar in appearance to the NHC.

Various other meteorological agencies across the world use breakpoints as well, though to a lesser extent than the three agencies discussed above.
