= Barra El Mezquital =

Coordinates: 24°55′N 97°34′W

Barra El Mezquital, Tamaulipas, Mexico.

Barra El Mezquital is a barrier island on the coast of the Mexican state of Tamaulipas, separating the Laguna Madre from the Gulf of Mexico. It lies approximately 60 kilometres (40 miles) east of San Fernando, Tamaulipas, and 120 km (75 mi) south of Brownsville, Texas, U.S. It is used as a reference point ("breakpoint") in government-issued weather advisories.
