= Ponderosa Forest, Texas =

Coordinates: 30.019°N 95.462°W

Ponderosa Forest is a residential neighborhood in unincorporated northwestern Harris County, Texas, United States. It is located near Farm to Market Road 1960, also referred to as Cypress Creek Parkway.

== History ==
Ponderosa Forest is a master-planned community developed during the late 1960s and 1970s in multiple phases by the Kickerillo Companies in Harris County, Texas, within the northern limits of the City of Houston, Texas. Kickerillo Companies is one of Houston's largest homebuilding and land development companies. Founded by Vincent Kickerillo, Kickerillo Companies has developed over 30 communities in the metropolitan region.

Ponderosa Forest was built as one of the first subdivisions in the vicinity of FM 1960, pre-dating Olde Oaks and Greenwood Forest and sharing common master-planning and architectural characteristics. The neighborhood is bordered by Ella Boulevard to the East, FM 1960 to the South, and Cypress Creek to the North. The subdivision offers direct access to Interstate 45 and is typically described as stable, established, and upscale. Along with other neighborhoods featuring custom built homes in the FM 1960 vicinity, Ponderosa Forest is often referred to as the "River Oaks of North Houston."

== Design ==
Ponderosa Forest is heavily wooded and well maintained. The neighborhood is modeled on the traditional planning patterns of historic River Oaks in central Houston and characterized by its established landscape. Houses are sited on generous lots with mature native pine trees and oaks. During the initial stages of land development, substantial areas of the native woodland forest were reserved. Trees were protected and houses were "carved" into forested lots. Generously scaled houses are sited formally along grid-networked streets with free-standing garages positioned in rear lots. This master-planning feature allows cars to be typically parked beyond the public view corridor, allowing the neighborhood to maintain a manicured appearance. The majority of homes in Ponderosa Forest were custom designed and well appointed with custom interior cabinetry, wainscoting, and woodwork details. Architectural styles reflect predominant suburban vernaculars of the early to mid-1970s including Georgian Colonial, English Tudor, French Colonial, and Contemporary.

== Amenities ==
Ponderosa Forest amenities include a neighborhood park with a playground and direct access to the Cypress Creek natural area and future Cypress Creek Greenway. Through the construction of an extensive trail system and additional parks, the City of Houston is creating connectivity along Cypress and Little Cypress creeks. The future Cypress Creek Greenway will connect a series of parks stretching from Hwy. 290 in the west to Highway 59 in the east. This greenway will create natural buffer zones, contiguous trail connectivity, and a linear wildlife habitat in the immediate vicinity of Ponderosa Forest. Community activities and organizations include a community swim team, a garden club, senior citizens group, civic association, and others. Residents can easily access downtown Houston, The Woodlands, Old Town Spring, and Bush Intercontinental Airport. Shopping and entertainment venues within the immediate vicinity include Willowbrook Mall, Champions Village, The Vintage, Old Town Spring, and The Woodlands Mall.

== Schools ==
Ponderosa Forest is in the Spring Independent School District.

Ponderosa Elementary School

Bammel Middle School

Westfield High School

Beginning in the 2020–2021 school year, students in Ponderosa Forest will attend Wells Middle School and Spring High School, both also in Spring ISD.

== Community representation ==
Ponderosa Forest is a deed-restricted community. Its residents are represented by the Ponderosa Forest Civic Association (PFCA). The PFCA was established at the inception of the neighborhood to advocate for a strong sense of community, encourage civic responsibility, enhance living conditions, and promote the public interest of the Ponderosa Forest subdivision.

== Streets ==
- Anvil
- Ash Meadow
- Beaver Creek
- Big Horn
- Bodart
- Butte Creek
- Canyon Creek
- Castlerock
- Comstock
- Corral
- Elk River
- Ella
- Fall River
- Grand Valley
- Hamlin Valley
- Pine Gap
- Ridge Top
- Roanwood
- Rolling Creek
- Rustic Canyon
- Rustic Pine
- Saddlecreek
- Sandy Cliffs
- Sugar Pine
- Sweet Grass
- Tucumcari
- Wagon Gap
