= Grenadian Americans =

Americans of Grenadian birth or descent

Total population
- 28,488 (Grenadian ancestry, 2010 US census); 31,263 (Grenadian-born, 2013)

Regions with significant populations
- Found in New York City; Boston; Philadelphia; Washington, D.C.; Atlanta; Miami

Languages
- English (American English, Grenadian Creole), Grenadian Creole French

Religion
- Predominantly Roman Catholicism: Protestantism; Anglicanism; Others

Grenadian Americans are Americans whose ancestry came from the Caribbean island of Grenada, or Grenadians who have American citizenship. Since 1984, nearly 850 Grenadians arrive legally in the United States each year, and the number of Grenadian Americans was 25,924 in 2000. They began immigrating to the US primarily from 1950. Between 2007 and 2011, there were approximately 30,320 Grenadian-born residents in the United States.

== History ==
The Grenadian migration to the United States began in the first half of the twentieth century. Grenadians first settled in cities of the northeastern US, primarily in New York and Boston. Between 1900 and 1940 the number of Grenadians who immigrated to the US did not reach a thousand.

Grenadian immigration to the US increased only from the 1950s, after World War II. This increase was due to female migration at the end of the decade. However, few Grenadians were allowed to immigrate to the US legally. Grenadian women often worked as nurses or maids. In the mid-1950s, "when oil refineries were machined" in Grenada and had reduced their operating income, the US allowed a group of oil workers from Grenada to immigrate to this country. These Grenadians managed to immigrate to the US legally by various means. Some had managed to establish relationships with important people from the oil companies, in which they worked, or the naval base of other Caribbean places, particularly in Chaguaramas, Trinidad, and their bosses recommended them to American employers. Others enrolled their children at US schools, and when they got jobs and came into contact with people who "help them with immigration requirements", they asked that their parents obtain a legal status to live in the U.S. Others originally immigrated to England or to the United States Virgin Islands, where they worked in oil refineries, to emigrate from there (most of them crossing Canada), to the United States.

Canada sponsored labor courses to train women in domestic service (which lasted two years) in the Caribbean. After finishing the courses, these women were able to migrate to the United States, although only a few hundred of them did so. They immigrated to places such as Washington, D.C., New York, and Boston. In the 1960s, the US favored the immigration of Caribbean maids to the United States. Hundreds of women from Grenada immigrated to the US to work in domestic service in the Northeast, mainly in New York.

Following the adoption of the Hart-Celler Immigration Reform, 1965, the number of Grenadians who moved to this country increased. This law replaced the mass European immigration to the US by the Caribbean.

Between 1960 and 1980, 10,391 Grenadians immigrated to the US legally.

In the 1970s and 1980s, many Grenadians who moved to the US did that for political reasons. They rejected the change of politicians in Grenada, since the policies exercised by the government of Grenada were being influenced by communism.

Immigration from Grenada to the United States also took place between 2004 and 2005 after Hurricane Ivan and Hurricane Emily Struck Grenada. In September 2009, an American of Grenadian descent, Jumaane Williams, became the first Grenadian-American in New York City's Council.

It is documented that from 1900 to 2019 roughly around 22,000 - 32,000 Grenadians immigrated to the United States of America.

== Demography ==
Since 1984 about 850 Grenadians immigrate legally to the United States annually. At present, the number of Grenadians who can immigrate to the US legally is far fewer than Europeans. However, the number of Grenadians that might come, exceed the allowed number of the same group at the beginning of the century.

Although the majority language is English, many Grenadian Americans also speak their "creole" or "broken Creole, a combination of French, Inglés, and African patois.

Although Grenadian immigrants retain the traditional customs of Grenada, the second generation of Grenadine Americans onwards have adapted to the American culture, mainly to the African American one, since most of them live in African American neighborhoods.

However (and in spite of that) the relations between the Grenadian Americans and their land of origin have been maintained. Even, many Grenadian associations were founded with the purpose of helping Grenada economically.

New York is the main destination of Grenadian immigration in the world.

== Assimilation ==
Most Grenadian Americans descend from Africans imported to Grenada as slaves. The rest of the Grenadians are mulattos (i.e. the result of a mix between whites and blacks), descendants of East Indians (who migrated as cheap labor in the 19th century after slavery was abolished), and whites of European descent. Many Grenadians immigrated to African American neighborhoods.

== Education ==
Education is very important for Grenadian Americans, as it is a way to prosper. Thus, they attend school every day, meeting US law. Most Grenadian Americans are (or were) enrolled in public schools. There are also many adult Grenadians who have decided to study for technical training or finish high school. A growing number of Grenadians attend college in the US. Although many Grenadians come to the US to study and get better employment opportunities in Grenada in the future, they end up settling permanently in the US, and raising a family. Some do return to Grenada to help their compatriots.

== Politics ==
Grenadian Americans still retain strong ties to Grenada, and know much of the politics of their country, which is received by radio, newspapers and television. They also gather information through telephone communication with family and friends who still live there.

Most Grenadian Americans defended the American invasion of Grenada in 1983 because they believed that, in this way, the US could restore democracy in that country.

The Grenadians living in the US tend to help people who still live in their country of origin. On 28 January 1999, a press release was issued by the office of the Prime Minister of Grenada which indicated that just the day before, nearly 300 Americans had met with Grenadian Prime Minister Keith Mitchell in the American city of Boston, to ask how they could participate in the development of Grenada. He explained that they should adopt the educational institutions, supply of equipment and technical development of Grenada to facilitate the work of the Grenadians. Thus, the Grenadian Americans introduced a school in Grenada and "donate equipment and supplies" annually.

== Notable people ==
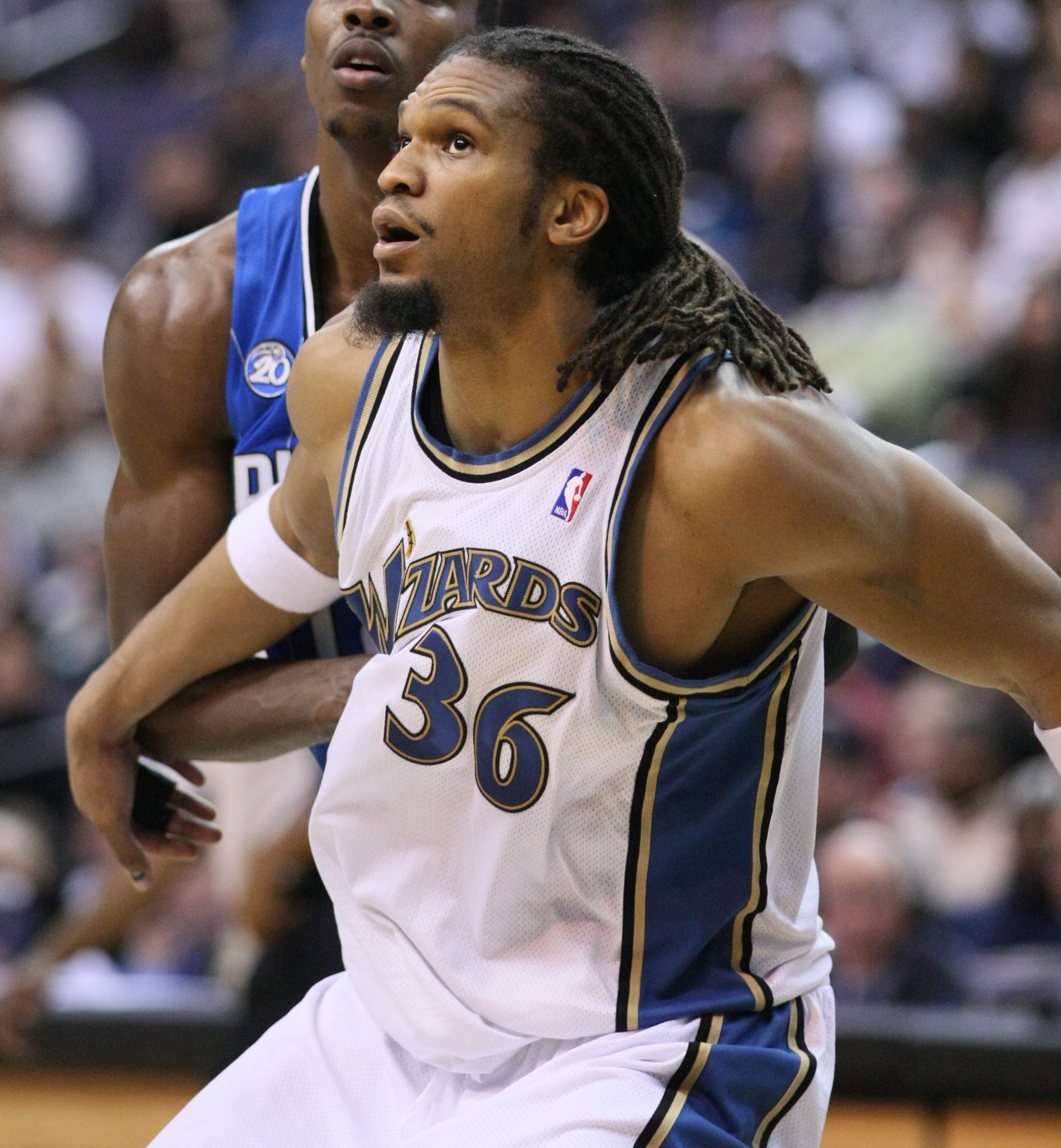
Etan Thomas

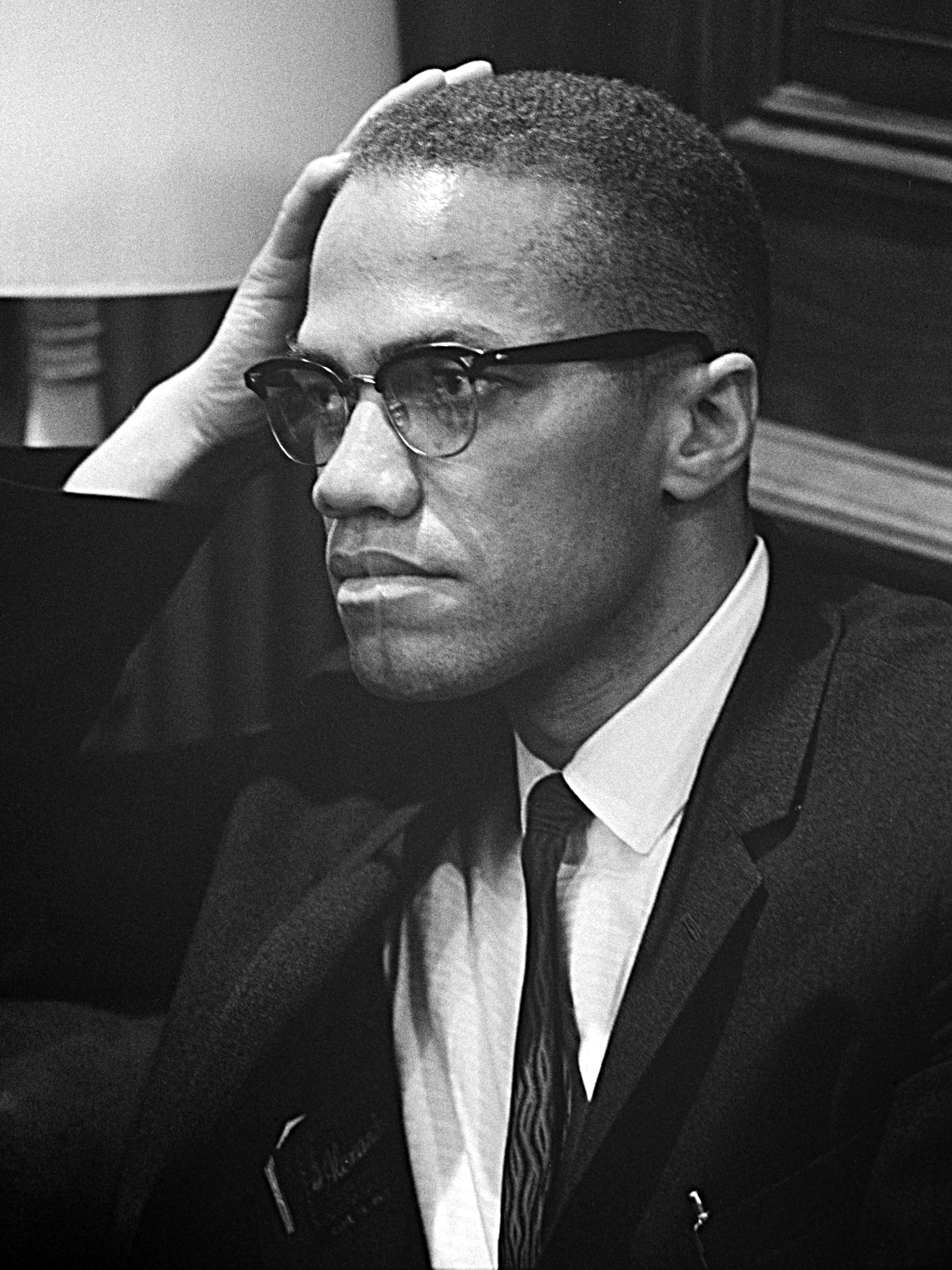
Malcolm X

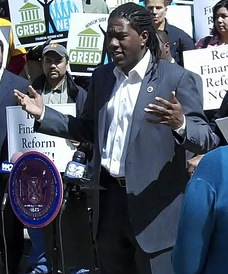
Jumaane Williams

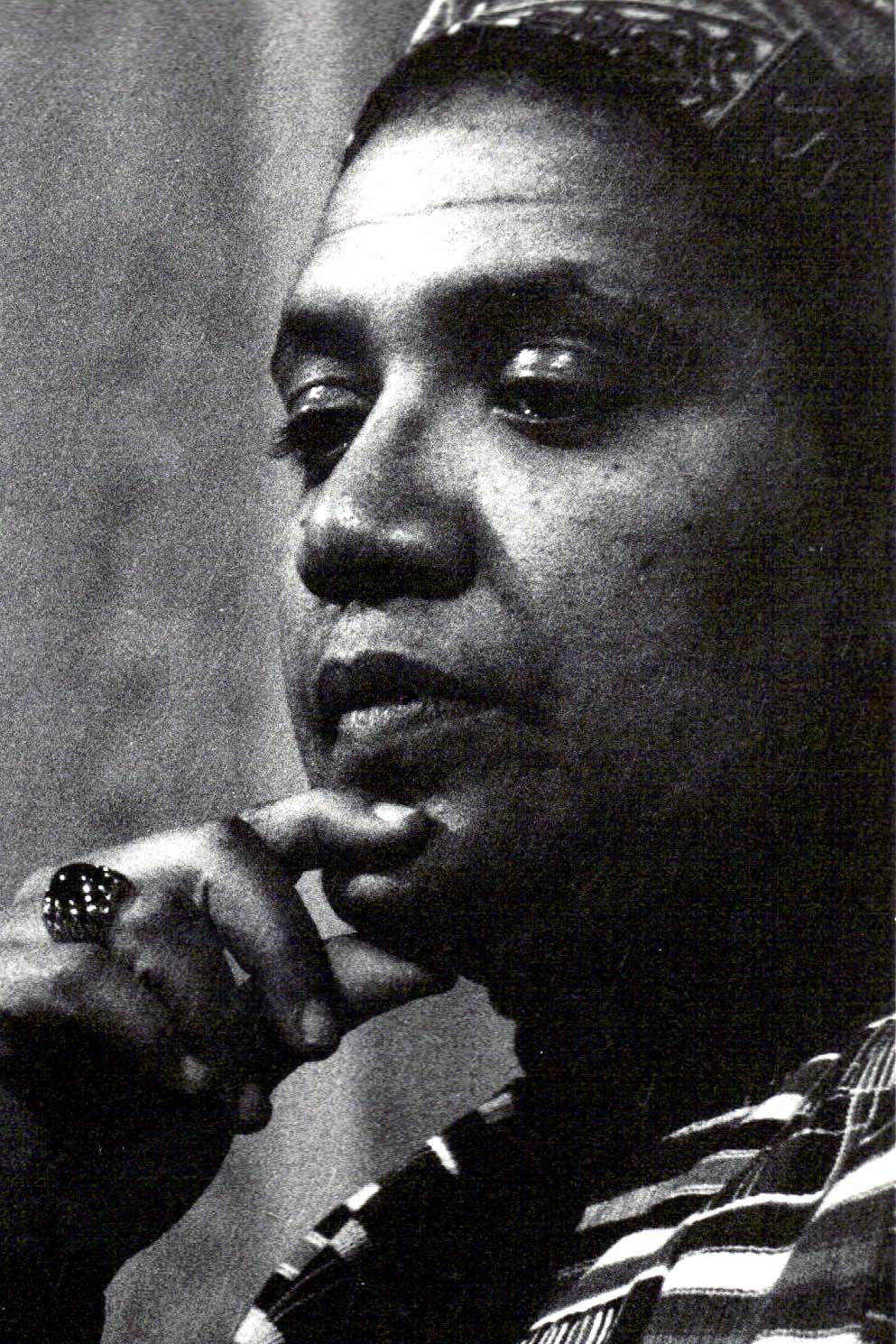
Audre Lorde

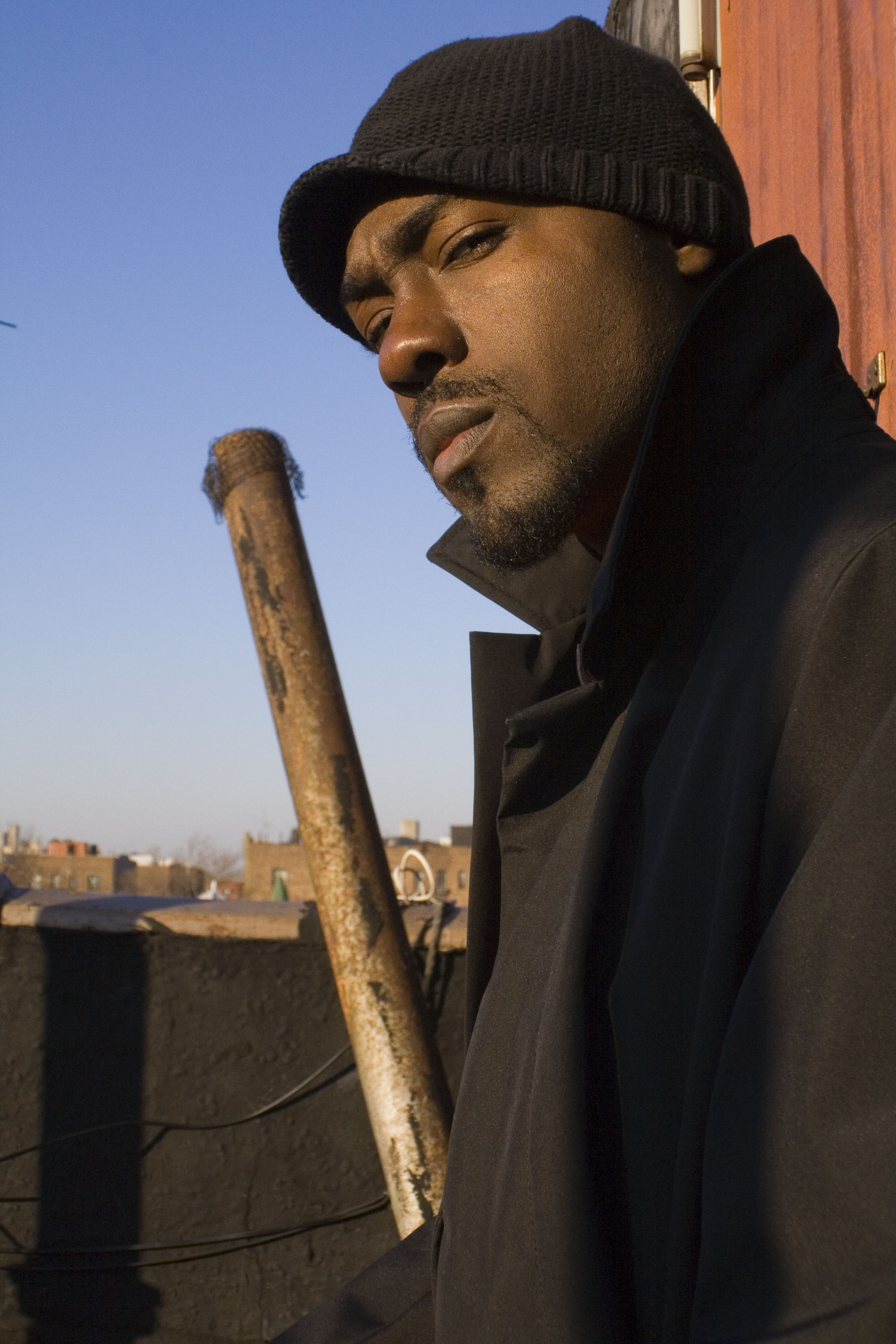
Never Yet Contested

- Tarik Phillip
- Malcolm X
- Louise Little
- Audre Lorde
- Never Yet Contested
- Kirk Knight
- Wyatt Cenac
- Kim Driscoll
- Amanda Seales
- Bern Nadette Stanis
- Etan Thomas
- Jumaane Williams

== See also ==
- Grenada–United States relations
