= Never Yet Contested =

American rapper

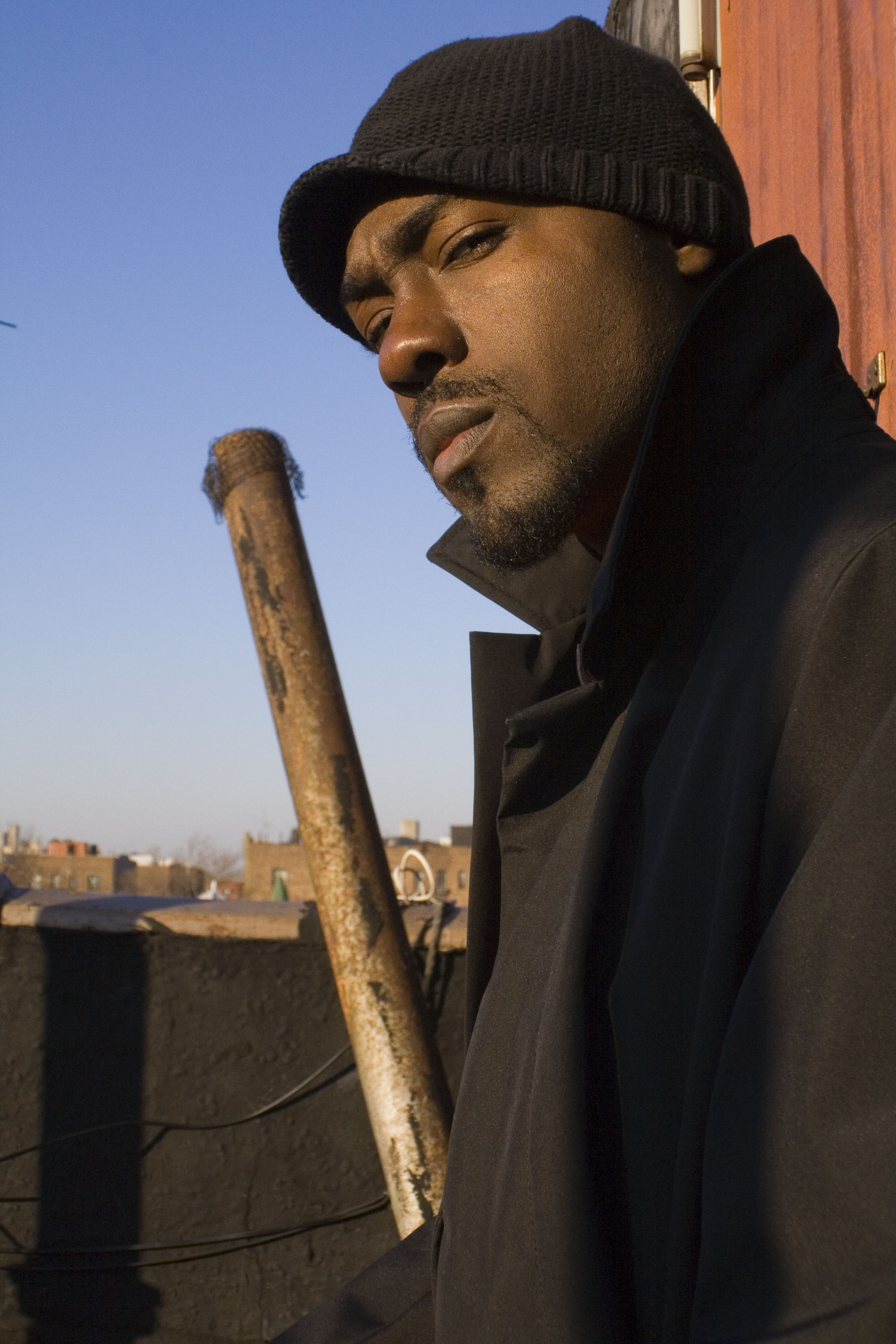
- Never Yet Contested

Background information
- Born: Joshua Solomon Jeremiah Jordan; January 9, 1985 (age 41); New York City
- Origin: New York City
- Genres: Hip hop, alternative rock, jazz, electronic, dance
- Occupations: Rapper-songwriter, record producer
- Instrument: Vocals
- Years active: 2008–present
- Label: Unsigned
- Website: Official website

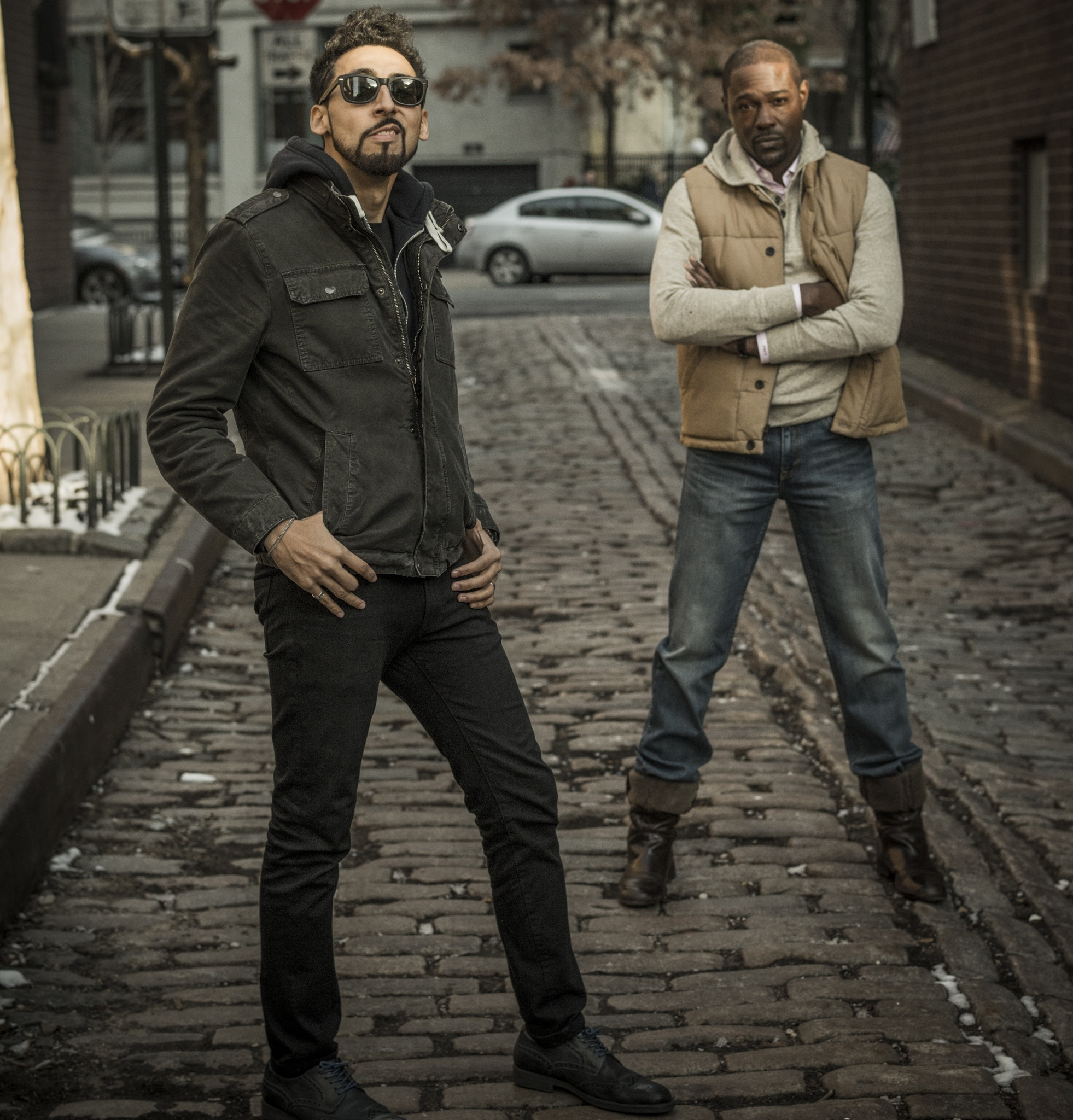
Morsy x Never Yet Contested Formative Feedback Press Shoot - West Village, New York City

Joshua Solomon Jeremiah Jordan (born January 9, 1987), better known by his stage name, Never Yet Contested, is an American rapper, artist, songwriter, and record producer. He was born and raised in Brooklyn, New York.

Never Yet Contested has appeared on tracks with artists including R-Son & Ad Liberal (The Flight Brothers), J. J. Brown (5G Productions) and Louis Logic. He is inspired by Busta Rhymes, Mos Def, Talib Kweli, Common, The Roots, Black Thought, Pharoahe Monch, Rakim, Nas, The Notorious B.I.G., Red Hot Chili Peppers, Coldplay, Snoop Dogg, Dr. Dre, and A Tribe Called Quest.

== Early life ==
Never Yet Contested was born Joshua Solomon Jeremiah Jordan, in New York. He is of Guyanese and Grenadian descent. Never Yet Contested grew up in New York City and attended Brooklyn Technical High School. He received an undergraduate degree from Pennsylvania State University.

== Career ==
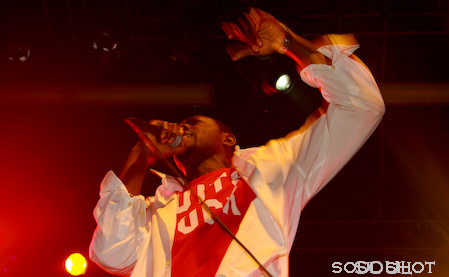
Never Yet Contested at the Nokia Theatre, New York City in 2008

Never Yet Contested's first mixtape was his independently released Showmanship, then in 2008 released the album ...In Retrospect.

Never Yet Contested's video for "I Can’t Take It/True Statement", featuring Baldi and Suburban Graffiti, won the mtvU's "The Freshmen" video contest in April 2009 and received video rotation on MTV.

=== Retro EP ===
Never Yet Contested collaborated with Tru Statement Entertainment to release his first EP, Retro EP on Black Friday, November 26, 2010. The lead single, "Retro", was scheduled to be released in conjunction with Nintendo celebrating the 25th anniversary of Super Mario Bros., based on the video game content of the song. The concept behind the Retro EP is "old school" themes (video games, relationships, instrumentation). The EP also features the first songs recorded by Never Yet Contested and producers/engineers J.J. Brown and Dan Maier of 5G Productions.

=== MC TXT ===
MC TXT ("emcee tee ex tee") is an interactive mobile application used in progressive hip-hop performance and entertainment. The audience members direct the venue by text messaging phrases, comments, and shout-outs to the mobile phone number provided on a main projector, where all messages are shown. Audience members then watch as their messages are displayed amid unique visual backgrounds within minutes. The various emcees associated with MC TXT include Homeboy Sandman, Illspokinn, Folklore, Baldi, and Never Yet Contested. The emcees then freestyle the messages, creating a string of punchlines, stories, and name drops for the audience.

=== The Melting Pot ===
Never Yet Contested's release The Melting Pot was purchasable by listeners either as a whole or as four smaller, genre-specific EPs.

=== Formative Feedback ===
In 2017, Never Yet Contested partnered with veteran DJ and producer, Morsy for Formative Feedback. Its genres include deep house, electronica, and bossa nova on the Raphaello Mazzei collaboration, “Nao A Solidao”.

== Discography ==
Albums, EPs and mixtapes

- Showmanship (2006)
- ... In Retrospect (2008)
- Retro EP (2010)
- The Melting Pot (2012)
- Formative Feedback (2017)

Collaborations and guest appearances (list is not exhaustive)

- Under the Weather: The NJLP (2006) (Baldi and Suburban Graffiti)
- The Planet (2010) (Par 3 Productions)
- F?@k Love (2010) (Tru Statement Entertainment)
- No Slices (2010) (Ayinde)
- More EP (2010) (M.A.E. Indigo and Express The Motif)
- Plus 30 (2010) (Free Trade)
- F?@k Love Volume 2 (2011) (Tru Statement Entertainment)
