= Tropical Storm Mindy =

Atlantic tropical storm in 2021

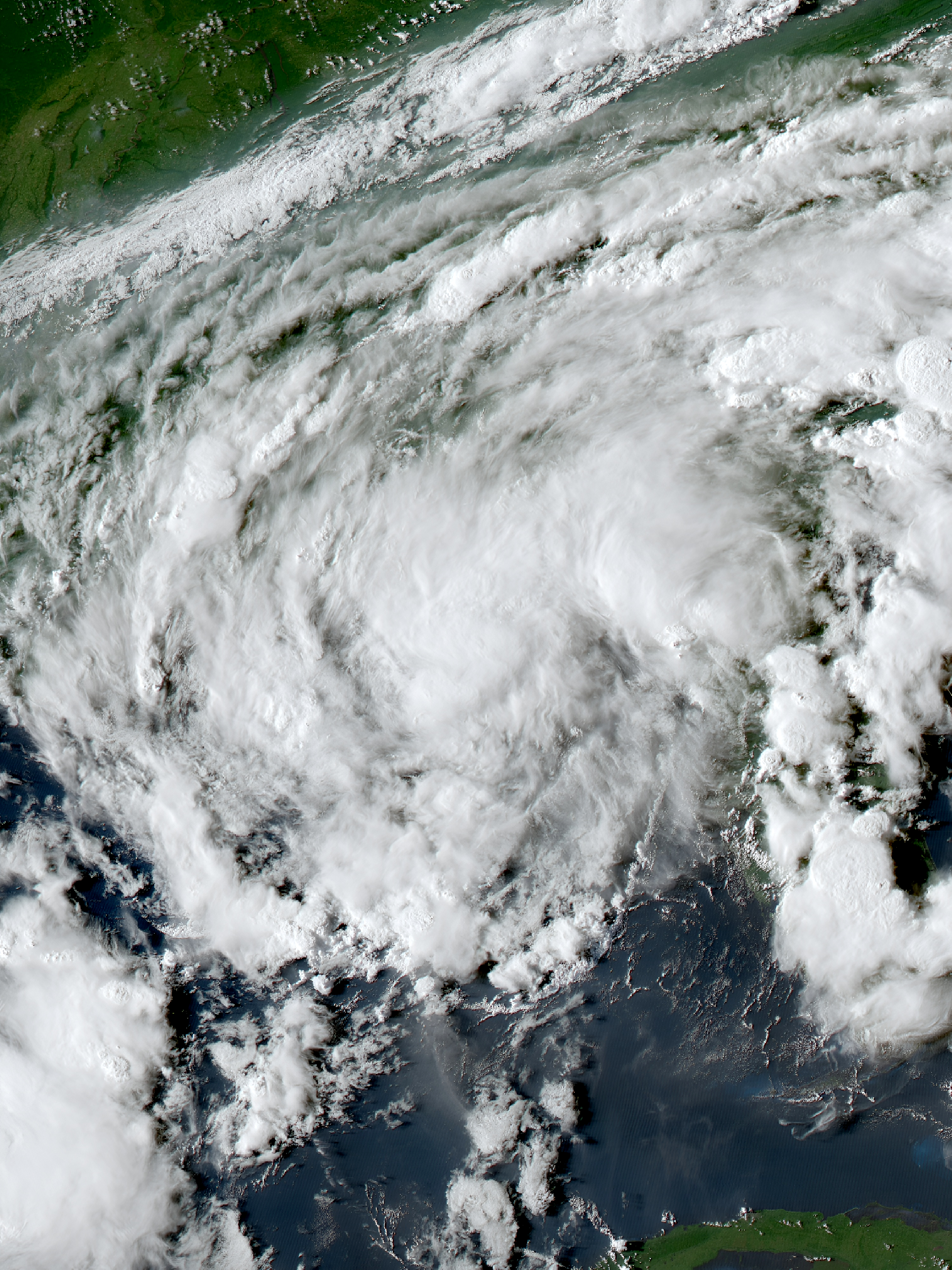
- Tropical Storm Mindy shortly after formation offshore Florida late on September 8

Meteorological history
- Formed: September 8, 2021
- Remnant low: September 10, 2021
- Dissipated: September 11, 2021

Tropical storm
- 1-minute sustained (SSHWS/NWS)
- Highest winds: 60 mph (95 km/h)
- Lowest pressure: 1000 mbar (hPa); 29.53 inHg

Overall effects
- Fatalities: 23 total
- Damage: $75.2 million (2021 USD)
- Areas affected: Colombia, Central America, Mexico, Southeastern United States
- IBTrACS
- Part of the 2021 Atlantic hurricane season

Tropical Storm Mindy was a short-lived tropical storm which affected much of Mexico and the Southeastern United States in September 2021. The thirteenth tropical storm of the 2021 Atlantic hurricane season, Mindy originated from a tropical wave which entered the Atlantic Ocean from the west coast of Africa on August 22. The wave traveled westward across the Atlantic, breaking apart for the first time on August 27. After moving through Central America breaking apart once more on September 2. The northern part of the wave moved into the Gulf of Mexico on September 5, moving gradually northward between two mid-level ridges. On September 8, the wave began showing signs of organization and gale-force winds, becoming Tropical Storm Mindy southwest of Apalachicola, Florida. Mindy intensified before landfall, attaining a peak intensity with maximum sustained winds of 60 mph (97 km/h) and a minimum barometric pressure of 1,000 mbar (30 inHg) at 01:15 UTC on September 9; as the cyclone made landfall on St. Vincent Island, Florida. The storm rapidly weakened inland before entering the Atlantic and being absorbed by a baroclinic system on September 11.

While moving across Mexico, the precursor to Mindy killed a total of 23 people and caused losses of $75 million (2021 USD) as a result of floods. As Mindy tracked across the Southeastern United States, minor damage was reported through tropical storm-force winds and heavy rainfall.

== Meteorological history ==
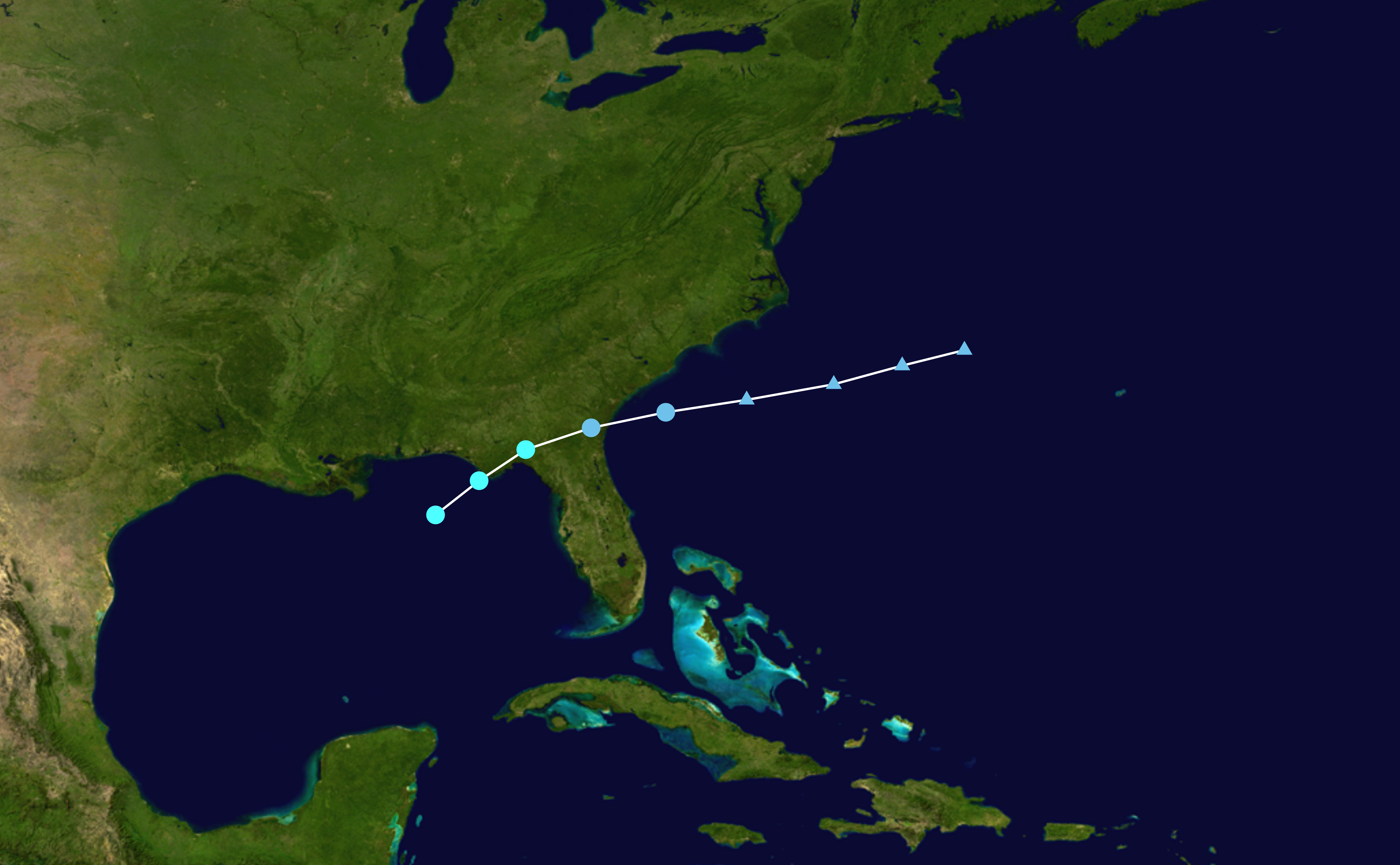
Map plotting the storm's track and intensity, according to the Saffir–Simpson scale Map key Saffir–Simpson scale Tropical depression (≤38 mph, ≤62 km/h) Tropical storm (39–73 mph, 63–118 km/h) Category 1 (74–95 mph, 119–153 km/h) Category 2 (96–110 mph, 154–177 km/h) Category 3 (111–129 mph, 178–208 km/h) Category 4 (130–156 mph, 209–251 km/h) Category 5 (≥157 mph, ≥252 km/h) Unknown Storm type Tropical cyclone Subtropical cyclone Extratropical cyclone, remnant low, tropical disturbance, or monsoon depression

A tropical wave entered the Atlantic Ocean off the coast of West Africa on August 22. The wave moved westward across the Atlantic, steered by a subtropical ridge to the north, fracturing first on August 27, with the northern part becoming Tropical Storm Kate and the southern part entering the Caribbean Sea between August 28–29. Briefly on September 1, the system showed some signs of organization, prior to crossing Central America the next day and stopping further development. While crossing Central America, the wave once more broke apart, with the new southern half emerging into the East Pacific and forming into Hurricane Olaf by September 7. The northern half moved over the Yucatán Peninsula between September 3–4 and entered the Gulf of Mexico on September 5.

Trapped between two mid-level ridges to the northwest and southeast, the wave was left within an area of weak steering currents, thus it moved gradually northward. A deep-layer trough over the western Gulf of Mexico boosted the system northeastward on September 8. An overnight burst of deep convection the same day helped the disturbance become better-defined at the surface level, thus scatterometer data indicated gale-force winds and a well-defined center at 15:16 UTC. At 18:00 UTC, the National Hurricane Center (NHC) upgraded the disturbance into Tropical Storm Mindy, about 140 nautical miles southwest of Apalachicola, Florida. Throughout the remainder of the day, Mindy strengthened within environmental conditions of warm ocean temperatures of 84 °F (29 °C), moderate southwesterly vertical wind shear, and marginally favorable mid-level humidity of 60%. However, Mindy had limited time over the Gulf of Mexico as it raced northeastwards toward land.

At 01:15 UTC on September 9, a combination of surface observations and radar data indicated that Mindy had attained a peak intensity with maximum sustained winds of 60 mph (97 km/h) and a minimum barometric pressure of 1,000 mbar (30 inHg); as it made landfall on St. Vincent Island, Florida. These radar observations along with velocity data depicted Mindy with a well-defined circulation and spiral banding upon landfall. Over the next few hours, Mindy pushed inland across Florida's Big Bend region, skirting to the south of Tallahassee. By 12:00 UTC the same day, Mindy was downgraded to a tropical depression by the NHC, before emerging back into the Atlantic Ocean just six hours later. Increases of westerly vertical wind shear combined with a recent cold front offshore the Southeastern United States caused Mindy to lose tropical characteristics and convection to become disorganized. At 00:00 UTC on September 10, Mindy transitioned into a post-tropical cyclone around 150 nautical miles southeast of Wilmington, North Carolina. The remnant circulation was noted for another day before fully embedding within a baroclinic zone at 00:00 UTC on September 11.

== Preparation and impact ==
=== Mexico ===
In Mexico, the precursor to Mindy dropped torrential rainfall between September 2–7, resulting in flooding. The worst flooding was reported in the states of Hidalgo, Morelos, Mexico City, State of Mexico, and Jalisco. These floods caused a total of 23 fatalities and $75 million (2021 USD) worth of losses. A total of 31,000 homes were also damaged by flooding.

In Hidalgo, the Tula River and Rosas River was affected by more than two days of heavy rainfall, resulting in the overtopping of their banks. In Atotonilco de Tula, flooding from the former river forced the evacuation of 41 individuals from a hospital, and caused the deaths of 17 others. Most of the fatalities were patients that had been hospitalized with COVID-19 as stated by Governor Omar Fayad, posting images showing nurses evacuating patients from deep floodwaters. More than 1,000 additional residents were evacuated across the city, while damage was reported to several buildings.

Across the state of Morelos, flooding was reported in several communities which left four dead and one missing. More than 300 homes received damage, severely affecting about 1,600 citizens. In Tlayacapan, all four fatalities in the state were reported in the village where sixty homes had damage. Shelters were opened for victims of flooding in the state. Cleanup and rescue efforts were assisted by the Red Cross and local civil protection. On September 3, Governor Cuauhtémoc Blanco expressed condolences to victims and pledged to distribute relief supplies while warning of remaining river flooding in the region. In Ecatepec de Morelos, state media reported on two deaths due to flooding in the area. More than 100,000 residents in the city were affected by flooding. Around 60 vehicles sustained damage from the storm in Morelos, as well as infrastructure. Mexibús transit routes were disrupted by flooding in Chimalhuacán, in the State of Mexico. A road connecting Mexico City to the state of Morelos was flooded by waters with a depth of 1.7 feet (0.52 m). The precursor to Mindy affected the region on the same day as a powerful earthquake impacted the nearby state of Guerrero and was felt around Mexico City and surrounding states.

In Jalisco, more than 1,000 homes were damaged by flooding that reached depths of 19 inches (48 cm) in some areas. Across the southern portion of the Guadalajara metropolitan area, firefighters and members of the civil protection rescued stranded vehicles and removed debris from clogged drains to clear roads. Flooding in Tlaquepaque blocked vehicles from crossing some roads for several minutes. In one of the municipalities' neighborhoods, severe flooding inundated homes and left many stranded on their roofs. Multiple dams were overtopped in Tlajomulco as a result of excessive precipitation, spreading floodwaters over a road and halting traffic. Another street in the town was flooded by the collapse of a fence retaining floodwaters. A public transport unit collided with a vehicle carrying deployed personnel in Tlajomuclo, resulting in several injuries and the needed assistance of paramedics. At least three people in Guadalajara required rescue after their vehicles were swept away in a downpour. Three homes were flooded in the Zapopan neighborhood of Miramar by the overflow of a nearby stream. The neighborhood of La Primavera also suffered flooding which entered homes and caused a vacant structure to collapse. In other nearby neighborhoods, floodwaters reached a level of 5.9 inches (15 cm).

=== United States ===
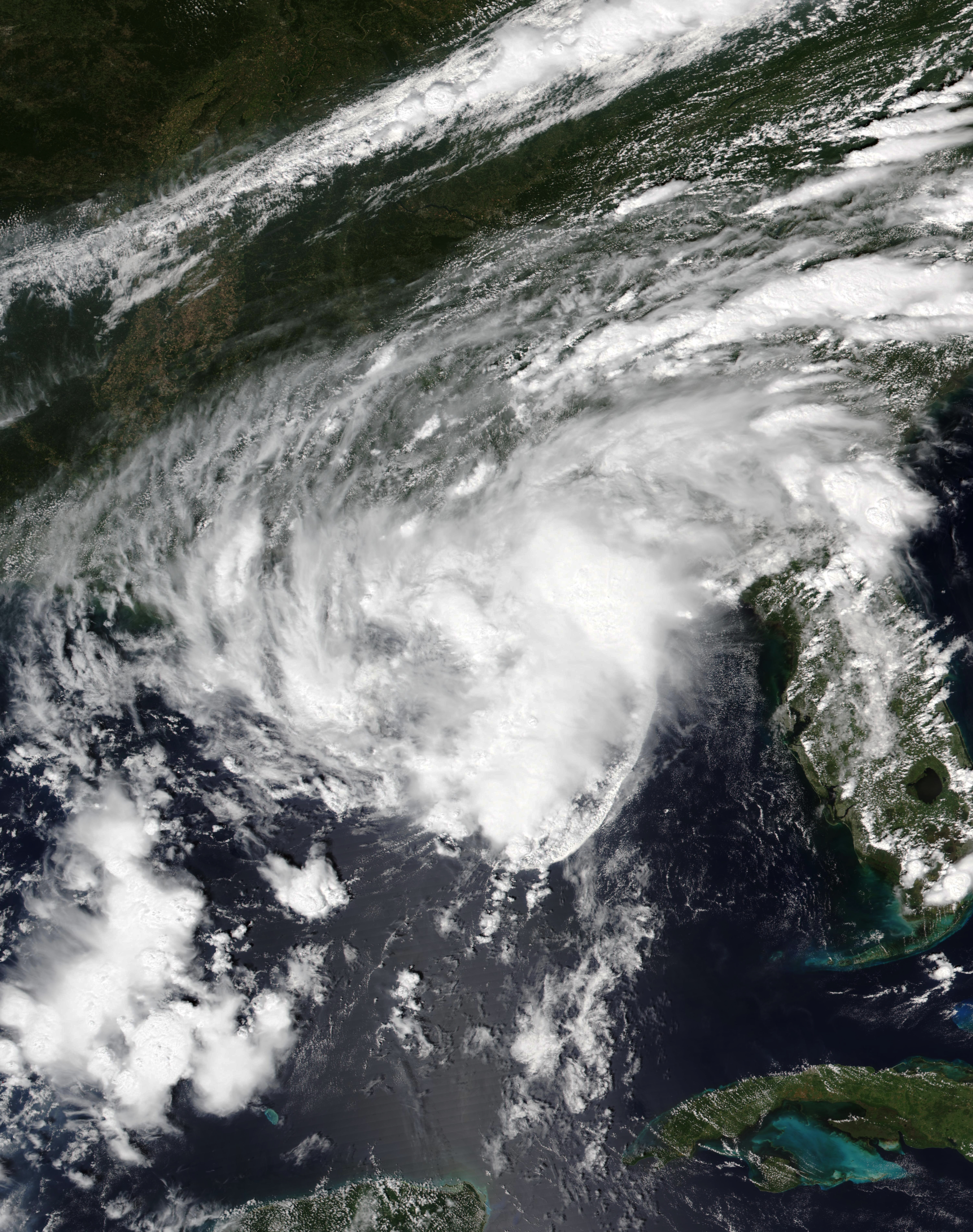
Tropical Storm Mindy intensifying off the Gulf Coast on September 8

Mindy's genesis was not well forecast as the NHC was unsure about where the storm would possibly, if at all, spawn. As a result, a Tropical Storm Warning was not issued until the storm was just hours away from landfall. The first of these warnings was issued at 21:00 UTC on September 8 and covered an area from Mexico Beach to the Steinhatchee River in Florida. This warning was expanded slightly before being discontinued as Mindy pushed inland at 09:00 UTC on September 9. Prior rainfall from Hurricane Elsa and Hurricane Ida saturated low—lying areas in Dixie County, forcing residents to evacuate. As a precaution for Mindy, the government of New York City tested a new alert system following major flooding from the remnants of Hurricane Ida.

In the United States, Mindy left overall minor damage from tropical storm-force winds and heavy rainfall. A peak wind gust of 54 mph (87 km/h) was observed at Island View Park in Carrabelle, Florida on September 9 while a wind gust of 61 mph (98 kmh) was also reported at an elevation of 115 feet (35 m) at Tyndall Air Force Base. A small storm surge of 1 to 2 feet (0.30 to 0.61 m) was reported along the coasts of the Big Bend of Florida and Apalachee Bay. A peak surge of 2.3 feet (0.70 m) was reported by gauge in Steinhatchee. A rainfall accumulation of 4.85 inches (123 mm) was observed in Tallahassee, while Mindy's outer bands produced a peak total of 5.6 inches (140 mm) of precipitation in Beverly Hills. More than 10,000 customers lost electricity in the region because of Mindy, with outages extending into southeastern Georgia. Leon High School and an elementary school in Tallahassee started classes on September 9 without electricity until it was restored a few hours later. Across Leon County, two home suffered damage from downed trees, along with a destroyed manufactured home where a person was trapped inside but escaped unscathed. A semi truck was blown off a road near Tallahassee. Flooding was reported in Lynn Haven and Parker after grounds were saturated by recent rainfall and Mindy. Fallen trees were observed across Franklin, Jefferson, Wakulla, and Holmes counties in Florida. An EF0 tornado was also spawned in Wakulla County near Crawfordville, although damage was only minor and limited to trees. In Jefferson County, large oak trees were downed south of U.S. 27 and the Waukeenah Highway, leaving all customers of Duke Energy in the area without power.

Scattered power outages affected most of Georgia as a result of Mindy, with the heaviest outages being reported around the towns of Pearson and Washington on the evening of September 9. Swaths of southeast Georgia up to Interstate 75 in Tifton reported 3–5 inches (76–127 millimetres) of rain. In Savannah, rainfall rates of an inch (25.4 mm) per hour were observed. In South Carolina, a combination of storm surge and heavy rainfall from Mindy prompted the closure of more than a dozen streets in Charleston. A peak rainfall amount of 5.68 inches (144 mm) was measured near Beaufort; rainfall totals of generally over 4 inches (100 mm) were observed along the South Carolina coast to the southeast of Interstate 95 from Beaufort to Charleston. A large tree crushed a vehicle and home in Burton. Another residence in Beaufort was struck by lightning, causing about $20,000 (2021 USD) worth of damage. Law enforcement was forced to place barricades on flooded roads near a Charleston hospital. Floodwaters entreated a nail salon in a low-lying part of Charleston, being pushed in by passing vehicles. Tidal levels in Charleston Harbor were measured near 6.8 feet (2.1 m) during the storm. Flooding was reported north of the Broad River, causing county sheriffs to close some flooded streets and advising motorists to seek alternate routes. Damage across South Carolina totaled $28,000. Total losses across the United States was worth $169,000.

== See also ==
- Weather of 2021
- Tropical cyclones in 2021
- Tropical Storm Bonnie (2004)
- Tropical Storm Emily (2017)
- Tropical Storm Nestor (2019)
