= Hurricane Emily (1987) =

Category 3 Atlantic hurricane in 1987

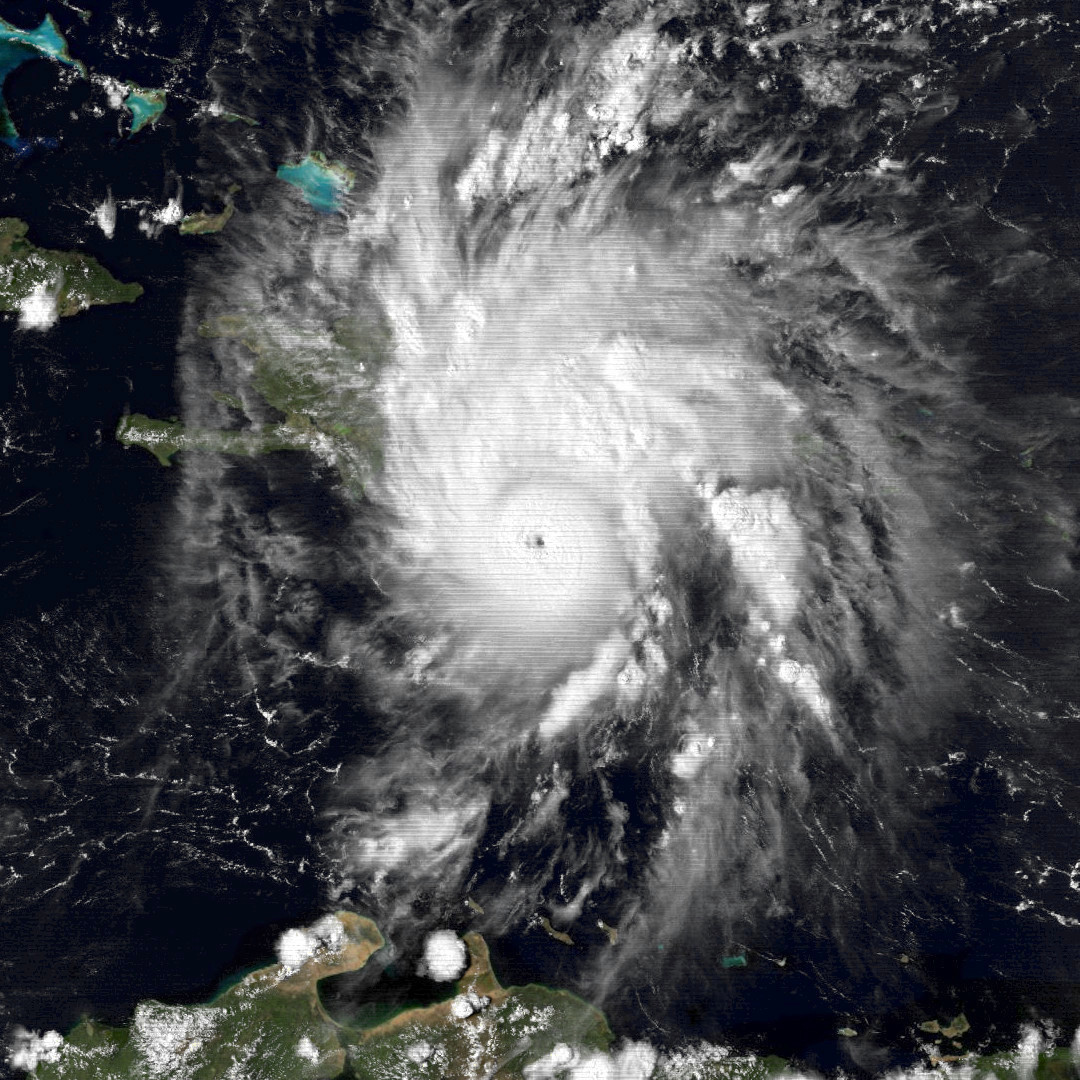
- Emily at peak intensity near landfall on the island of Hispaniola on September 22

Meteorological history
- Formed: September 20, 1987
- Dissipated: September 26, 1987

Category 3 major hurricane
- 1-minute sustained (SSHWS/NWS)
- Highest winds: 125 mph (205 km/h)
- Lowest pressure: 958 mbar (hPa); 28.29 inHg

Overall effects
- Fatalities: 3
- Injuries: 16
- Damage: $80.3 million (1987 USD)
- Areas affected: Lesser Antilles, Hispaniola, Bahamas, Bermuda
- IBTrACS
- Part of the 1987 Atlantic hurricane season

Hurricane Emily was a powerful tropical cyclone that struck Hispaniola in September 1987. It was the first hurricane in the Caribbean Sea since Hurricane Katrina of 1981 and had the second-fastest forward speed of a 20th-century hurricane, behind only the 1938 New England hurricane. The twelfth tropical cyclone, fifth named storm, second hurricane, and only major hurricane to develop during the below-average 1987 Atlantic hurricane season, Emily formed out of a tropical disturbance that moved off the west coast of Africa on September 20, the storm quickly attained hurricane status before undergoing rapid intensification. On September 22. The storm attained its peak intensity with winds of 125 mph (201 km/h) and a barometric pressure of 958 mbar (hPa; 28.29 inHg) later that day. The storm weakened to Category 2 status before making landfall in the Dominican Republic. After weakening to a tropical storm, Emily rapidly tracked northeastward through the Atlantic Ocean, undergoing a second phase of rapid intensification before passing directly over Bermuda on September 25. The following day the final public advisory from the National Hurricane Center was issued on the storm as it transitioned into an extratropical cyclone.

Hurricane Emily brought heavy rains and strong winds in the Windward Islands on September 21, leaving numerous homes damaged and severe losses in the banana industry. Losses throughout the islands amounted to $291,000. In the Dominican Republic, despite the storm's high intensity, relatively moderate damage occurred. Three people were killed by the storm and damages amounted to $30 million. Unexpected intensification of the storm led to severe impact in Bermuda. Overall, the storm caused over $80 million in damages, killed 3, and injured 16 people.

== Meteorological history ==
Map plotting the storm's track and intensity, according to the Saffir–Simpson scale Map key Saffir–Simpson scale Tropical depression (≤38 mph, ≤62 km/h) Tropical storm (39–73 mph, 63–118 km/h) Category 1 (74–95 mph, 119–153 km/h) Category 2 (96–110 mph, 154–177 km/h) Category 3 (111–129 mph, 178–208 km/h) Category 4 (130–156 mph, 209–251 km/h) Category 5 (≥157 mph, ≥252 km/h) Unknown Storm type Tropical cyclone Subtropical cyclone Extratropical cyclone, remnant low, tropical disturbance, or monsoon depression

Hurricane Emily originated out of a tropical disturbance, associated with the Intertropical Convergence Zone (ITCZ), that moved off the west coast of Africa on September 13. Tracking westward at a low latitude, the system fluctuated in organization, with the development and weakening of deep convection and weak outflow for several days. By September 18, the disturbance entered a region where there was sinking air, an inhibiting factor of tropical cyclone development. Two days later, the system separated from the ITCZ and quickly developed into a tropical depression, the twelfth of the season, while located about 605 miles (974 kilometers) southeast of Barbados.

Gradual intensification took place throughout September 20, attaining the status of tropical storm by 1800 UTC and received the name Emily. The storm tracked in a general west-northwest direction around the edge of a strong subtropical ridge. By 1200 UTC on September 21, the center of Emily passed directly over St. Vincent with winds of 50 mph (80 km/h). Situated underneath an anticyclone, rapid intensification took place as the storm quickly tracked towards Hispaniola. In the 24-hour span between 1800 UTC on September 21 and 1800 UTC on September 22, the central barometric pressure of the storm dropped 44 mbar (hPa) to 958 mbar (hPa; 28.29 inHg) and winds increased to 125 mph (201 km/h), equivalent to a high-end Category 3 hurricane on the Saffir–Simpson Hurricane Scale. At the time of peak intensity, the hurricane hunters recorded flight-level winds of 155 mph (249 km/h).

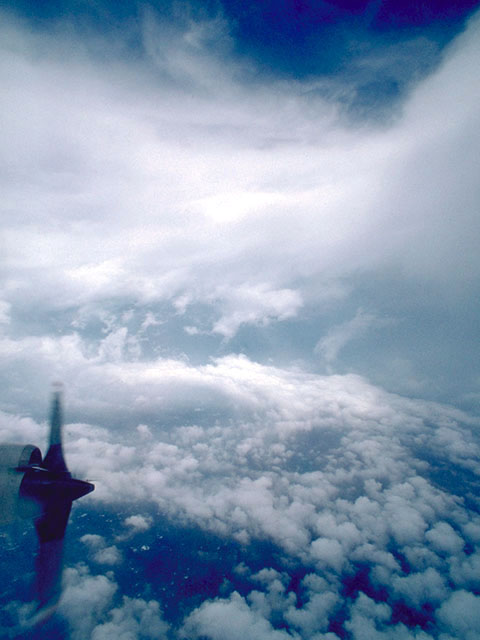
The eye of Hurricane Emily as seen by the Hurricane Hunters during a reconnaissance mission on September 22

Slight weakening took place late on September 22 and early on September 23 as the hurricane neared landfall. Around 0300 UTC, the eye of Emily tracked onshore between Barahona and Bani, Dominican Republic as a strong Category 2 hurricane with winds of 110 mph (180 km/h). Within 12 hours of landfall, the hurricane weakened to a tropical storm and had emerged into the Atlantic Ocean near Haiti with winds of 65 mph (105 km/h). The storm significantly slowed while tracking through the eastern Bahamas as a quasi-stationary frontal system influenced Emily. Moving generally towards the north, the center of circulation passed very close to Inagua and Mayaguana on September 24.

By midday on September 24, the system became embedded within the mid-latitude westerlies and rapidly accelerated towards the northeast. The National Hurricane Center anticipated that Emily would undergo an extratropical transition within 24 hours at this point as they forecast it to merge with the frontal system to the northeast. However, the storm unexpectedly underwent a second phase of rapid intensification on September 25, at one point reaching the rate of explosive intensification with the central pressure decreasing at 2.5 mbar per hour. By 0600 UTC, Emily had re-attained hurricane intensity and at 1145 UTC, the center passed directly over Bermuda with winds of 85 mph (137 km/h). Soon after, the storm reached its secondary peak intensity with winds of 90 mph (140 km/h) and a minimum pressure of 974 mbar (hPa; 28.76 inHg).

Hurricane Emily continued tracking northeast throughout September 25 into the following day with increasing speed. By late on September 25, the forward motion of the storm had reached 50 mph (80 km/h). The storm now began to undergo an extratropical transition with forward speed peaking at 68 mph (109 km/h), the second-highest forward motion ever recorded in a tropical cyclone. Interacting with a baroclinic zone, the hurricane completed its transition at 1800 UTC on September 26, resulting in the issuance of the final advisory on the storm.

== Preparations ==
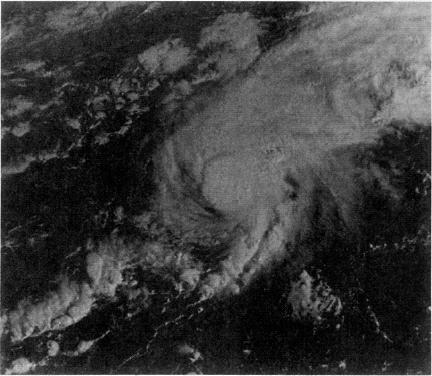
Hurricane Emily near Bermuda

As Tropical Storm Emily quickly approached the Windward Islands on September 21, a tropical storm warning was issued for Grenada, Barbados, St. Vincent and St. Lucia. A tropical storm watch was also declared for Martinique. As the storm tracked through the islands, all watches and warnings were discontinued later that day. Early on September 22, a hurricane warning was issued for the southern coast of the Dominican Republic and southern Haiti, including the southwestern peninsula. Upon attaining major hurricane status, a hurricane warning was declared for northern Haiti as the storm was anticipated to maintain hurricane intensity through landfall. Later that day, a hurricane watch was issued for the southeastern Bahamas and the Turks and Caicos Islands. This watch was later upgraded to a warning as the storm was expected to regain intensity over the Bahamas.

Following the anticipation of a more westerly track on September 23, a hurricane watch was issued for the northwestern Bahamas, later superseded by a warning, and a hurricane warning was declared for eastern Cuba. Early on September 24, all watches and warnings for the Caribbean Islands, including the Bahamas, were discontinued as Emily moved out over the Atlantic Ocean. On September 25, a special advisory was issued for Bermuda as tropical storm-force winds were likely to impact the island. Following the unexpected intensification, another special advisory was issued stating that hurricane-force winds would impact the island during the day on September 25. This advisory was discontinued following the storms' passage later that day.

Throughout the Windward Islands, schools and businesses were closed ahead of the storm. In the Dominican Republic, roughly 6,000 people were evacuated from Santo Domingo ahead of the storm. Although the storm never tracked towards Florida, state officials advised residents to prepare for the storm. Officials were in the "awareness stage" of hurricane preparation as they were discussing the possibility of impact from Emily. In the Turks and Caicos, residents were evacuated from low-lying areas to shelters throughout the islands.

On September 25, the Canadian Hurricane Centre issued its first information bulletin ever related to a tropical cyclone as Emily was moving into Canadian offshore waters. The agency was created less than a month earlier, and warned for the potential of heavy rainfall and strong winds in the ocean southeast of Newfoundland.

== Impact and aftermath ==
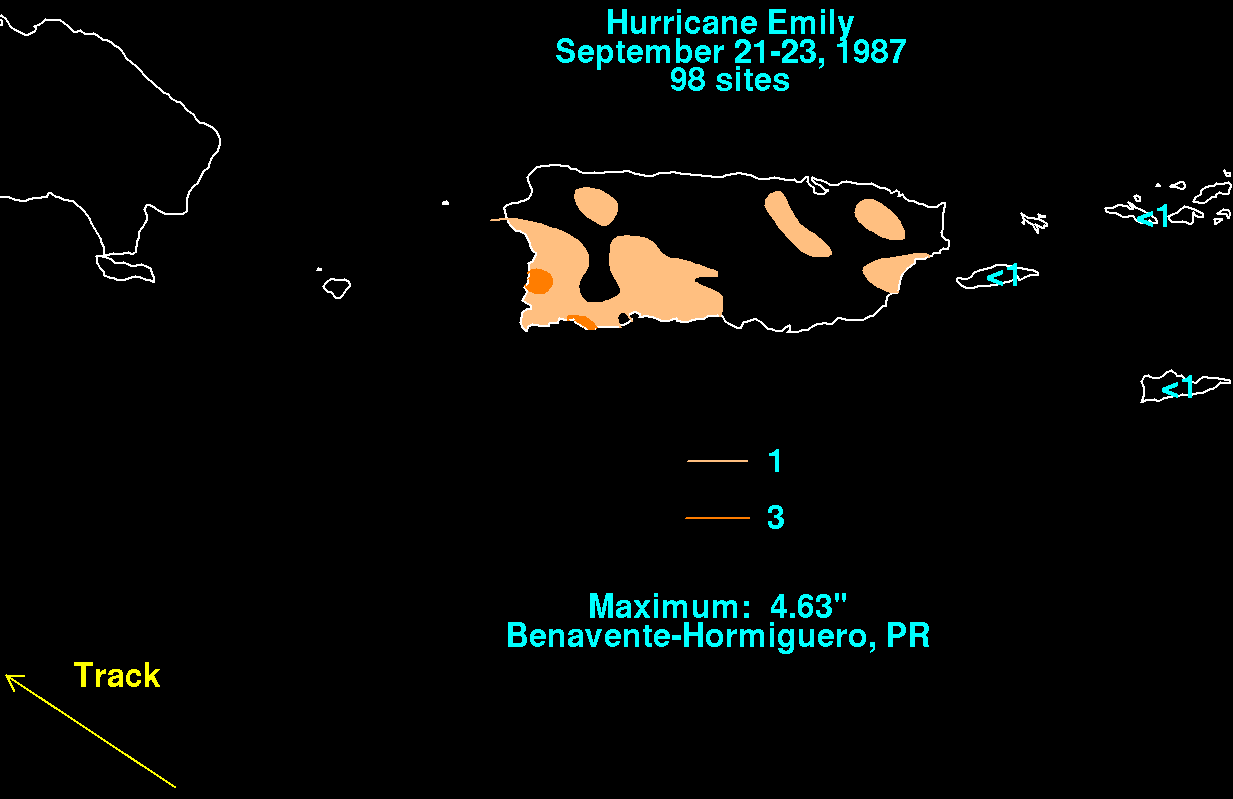
Rainfall totals from Hurricane Emily in Puerto Rico

Tracking through the Lesser Antilles as a tropical storm, Emily brought heavy rains to several islands. In Barbados, high winds caused widespread roof damage and downed trees and power lines; losses on the island reached $100,000. On St. Vincent, the banana industry sustained severe losses, with roughly 70% of the crop destroyed. Schools throughout the island were closed prior and during the storm. Up to 3 in (76 mm) of rain fell within six hours on the island, causing flooding that forced eight families to evacuate their homes. Damage on the island amounted to $191,000, mainly from landslides. The outer bands of Emily produced moderate rainfall across portions of southwest Puerto Rico, peaking at 4.63 in (118 mm).

In the Dominican Republic, Emily's heavy rains caused widespread mudslides, killing two people. Another person was killed after stepping on a downed power line. An estimated 5,000 people were left homeless in the aftermath of the storm. Upwards of 4.59 in (117 mm) of rain fell during the storm in the Dominican Republic. The farming industry was impacted particularly hard, with $30 million in losses occurring. Following the storm, hundreds of volunteers in the Dominican Republic assisted evacuees in shelters and helped officials clean up the affected areas. The Red Cross was also deployed to the region to assist those left homeless by the storm. In all, Emily caused $80.3 million in damage and killed three people.

Although Emily passed over Haiti, it produced little damage and no loss of life. The lack of fatalities was linked to the amount of forest remaining over the mountains of the country, estimated at 25% of their original size, compared to the 1.4% remaining in 2004. In the Bahamas, Emily produced winds up to 60 mph (97 km/h) along with rainfall up to 1.35 in (34 mm).

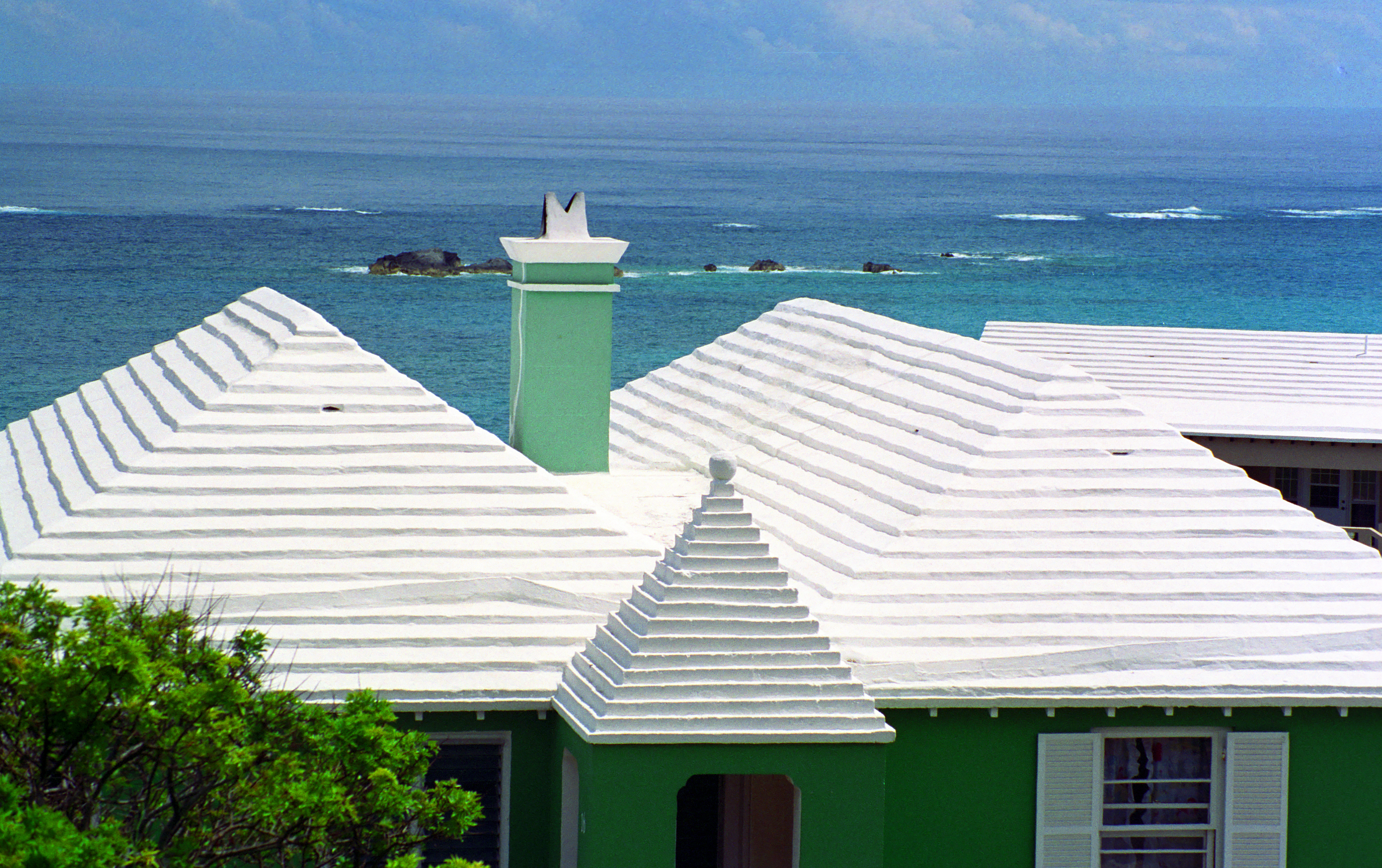
A typical Bermudian roof made up of heavy limestone slates

The storm was not expected to be strong when it passed Bermuda. Worse still, most Bermudians were unaware the storm had accelerated and covered a considerable distance overnight, and with no obvious signs of the imminence of its arrival, set off to work or school without making any preparations to protect their homes. Similarly to the 1926 Havana–Bermuda hurricane, the islanders were caught completely off guard by the 90 mph (140 km/h) winds. Cars and boats were affected the most. Wooden accommodation blocks on the United States Naval Air Station Bermuda were destroyed, but the tough building standards and the heavy masonry or concrete construction of buildings outside of the US bases meant that only a small number of houses experienced severe damage during the storm's passage. Bermudian roofs are constructed from heavy limestone slates. Bermudian houses are generally windproof, but are vulnerable to roof damage when the outside air pressure drops in the eye of a cyclonic storm and the expanding air inside a sealed house lifts the roof. The heavy limestone roofs are not easily moved, and are designed to shed slates, opening only a small breach instead of losing the entire roof. As a hurricane approaches, Bermudians close windows and storm shutters on the windward side but leave the leeward side windows open, allowing interior air pressure to rapidly equalise with the exterior without damage to the roof. As Bermudians would normally stay at home during a hurricane, once the storm centre had passed over, they would open the previously windward windows and close those on the opposite side (there is also a considerable difference in exterior air pressure between the windward and leeward sides of a house during a storm). As few were at home when the storm struck, and most had left all of their windows closed and locked, a great many homes suffered minor roof damage in the form of lost slates. This caused considerable difficulty as there were not enough roofers and not enough ready slate to quickly repair the damage, and also not enough tarpaulins either already in possession of home owners are in stock at hardware stores and supplies had to be specially flown in. Hurricane Emily, which Bermudians dubbed "The B****h that came to breakfast", caused $50 million in damage to the island, though no one was killed. About 230 buildings lost their roofs and 16 people were injured due to winds gusting in excess of 112 mph (180 km/h). The United States Naval Air Station Bermuda, where buildings were not constructed to local standards, suffered the greatest damage. An air show had to be cancelled and the Blue Angels flight demonstration squadron evacuated, though their Lockheed C-130 Hercules had to be left behind, sheltering in a hangar in which it did not quite fit. The Civil Air Terminal at the air station lost a large portion of its roof during the storm. Several cars and boats were flipped by the storm and a cruise ship carrying 700 people slipped from its moorings. Before the storm's landfall, officials in Bermuda cut power to roughly 90% of the island to protect the power grid. There were also unconfirmed reports of tornadoes associated with the storm. Emily was the strongest hurricane to hit Bermuda since the 1948 season.

== See also ==
- Other storms of the same name
- List of Category 3 Atlantic hurricanes
- List of Bermuda hurricanes
