= Hurricane Emily (1993) =

Category 3 Atlantic hurricane

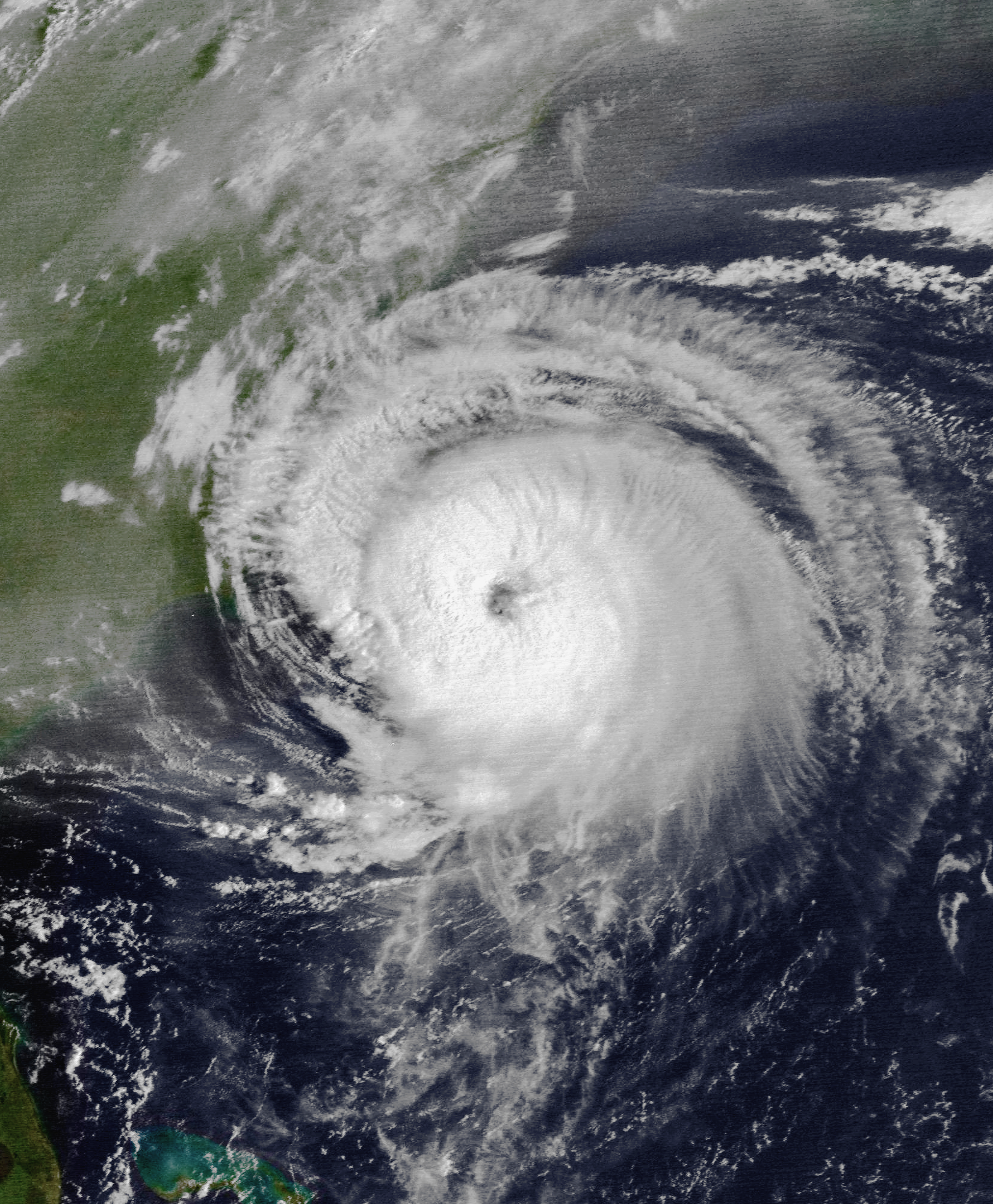
- Emily off the North Carolina coastline on August 31

Meteorological history
- Formed: August 22, 1993
- Dissipated: September 6, 1993

Category 3 major hurricane
- 1-minute sustained (SSHWS/NWS)
- Highest winds: 115 mph (185 km/h)
- Lowest pressure: 960 mbar (hPa); 28.35 inHg

Overall effects
- Fatalities: 3
- Damage: $35 million (1993 USD)
- Areas affected: East Coast of the United States (particularly Outer Banks of North Carolina)
- IBTrACS
- Part of the 1993 Atlantic hurricane season

Hurricane Emily in 1993 caused record flooding in the Outer Banks of North Carolina while remaining just offshore of the East Coast of the United States. The fifth named storm and the first yet strongest hurricane of the year's hurricane season, Emily developed from a tropical wave northeast of the Lesser Antilles on August 22, 1993. It moved northwestward and strengthened into a tropical storm on August 25, after becoming nearly stationary southeast of Bermuda. Emily then curved to the southwest but quickly resumed its northwest trajectory while strengthening into a hurricane. Late on August 31, the hurricane reached peak winds of 115 mph (185 km/h) on its approach to North Carolina. Although part of the eye passed over Hatteras Island in the Outer Banks, its absolute center remained 23 mi (37 km)/h) offshore. Gradually weakening, the hurricane swerved away from the coast toward the northeast and later east. Emily stalled again, this time northeast of Bermuda, and dissipated on September 6 to the southeast of Newfoundland.

The threat of Emily prompted hurricane warnings for much of the North Carolina coast and northward through Delaware. A mandatory evacuation for Ocracoke and Hatteras islands displaced 160,000 people during the busy Labor Day weekend; the loss in tourism revenue amounted to $10 million (1993 USD). About 1,600 residents on these islands rode out the storm in their homes, and emergency officials stayed behind. Most of the evacuees went to hotels or stayed with friends or relatives, causing an increase in business across southeastern Virginia, where effects were minimal. Due to uncertainty in forecasting Emily's path, there were also evacuations from the coasts of Virginia, Maryland, Delaware, and Fire Island in New York.

While bypassing the Outer Banks, Emily produced strong winds that coincided with high tides during a full moon, causing severe flooding along the Pamlico Sound. In Buxton, the floods left behind water marks as high as 10.54 ft (3.21 m), and the entire villages of Avon and Hatteras were inundated. The storm downed thousands of trees and wrecked 553 homes—completely destroying 168—leaving a quarter of the Cape Hatteras population homeless. Structural damage in North Carolina was estimated at $35 million. Along the coasts of North Carolina and Virginia, three swimmers drowned.

== Meteorological history ==
Map plotting the storm's track and intensity, according to the Saffir–Simpson scale Map key Saffir–Simpson scale Tropical depression (≤38 mph, ≤62 km/h) Tropical storm (39–73 mph, 63–118 km/h) Category 1 (74–95 mph, 119–153 km/h) Category 2 (96–110 mph, 154–177 km/h) Category 3 (111–129 mph, 178–208 km/h) Category 4 (130–156 mph, 209–251 km/h) Category 5 (≥157 mph, ≥252 km/h) Unknown Storm type Tropical cyclone Subtropical cyclone Extratropical cyclone, remnant low, tropical disturbance, or monsoon depression

Hurricane Emily originated from an African tropical wave that passed through the Cape Verde Islands on August 17, 1993. The wave traversed the tropical Atlantic and developed a closed cyclonic circulation five days later about 800 miles (1,300 km) east-northeast of Puerto Rico, when the National Hurricane Center (NHC) classified it as a tropical depression. Moving northwestward, the depression remained poorly organized for several days, with an ill-defined circulation center and sporadic thunderstorms, in part due to unfavorable wind shear from an upper-level low to its north. On August 25, the depression became nearly stationary in response to weakening steering currents. As the upper environment turned less hostile to development, a reconnaissance aircraft found unusually high sustained winds—an indication that the cyclone had quickly strengthened into a strong tropical storm. The NHC named the storm Emily and upgraded it to a hurricane the following day, based on reports of 75 mph (121 km/h) winds from a second reconnaissance mission.

Upon becoming a hurricane, Emily was centered roughly 1,000 mi (1,600 km) east of the Florida peninsula, passing well south of Bermuda. A ridge of high pressure began to mature to its north, forcing the hurricane westward on August 27. Emily's winds vacillated between tropical storm and hurricane force over the course of the day, although the cyclone resumed its strengthening by August 28 upon developing favorable upper-level outflow. Traversing warm sea surface temperatures, the hurricane continued to improve in appearance on satellite images, and the barometric pressure within its eye steadily decreased. Emily retraced toward the northwest on August 29, when a shortwave trough eroded the southern periphery of the contiguous ridge. The NHC expressed uncertainty in forecasting Emily's track, stating that South Carolina, North Carolina, and Mid-Atlantic states were at risk of a direct hit from the hurricane. As high pressure re-established itself off the North Carolina coast, Emily briefly turned west-northwestward on August 30 before initiating a prolonged curve toward the north. By that time, the NHC forecast Emily to remain offshore, though one tropical cyclone forecast model projected that the hurricane would move inland.

Early on August 31, a reconnaissance flight indicated that Emily had become a Category 2 hurricane on the Saffir–Simpson scale, and further intensification was expected because of warm waters. Later that day, reconnaissance reported that Emily had achieved a peak intensity of 115 mph (185 km/h), a Category 3 major hurricane; the aircraft also observed flight-level winds of 152 mph (245 km/h). At its peak, the center of the hurricane was located 23 mi (37 km) east of Hatteras Island while turning northward. Its eye measured 45 mi (72 km) in diameter, and a portion moved over Hatteras and the Pamlico Sound, constituting a direct hit but not a landfall. After affecting the Outer Banks, Emily continued around the large high-pressure area, turning northeastward into an area with cooler ocean temperatures. The eye nonetheless remained distinct, and Emily maintained much of its intensity through September 2. Later that day, the hurricane turned sharply eastward in response to a trough nearby. Wind shear over the region increased, weakening Emily as its eye feature quickly dissipated. Emily turned to the southeast and diminished to a tropical storm on September 3, about 500 mi (800 km) northeast of Bermuda, with a significant deterioration of the convection. Once again becoming nearly stationary, Emily further weakened to a tropical depression late on September 4, after only a small area of thunderstorms remained near the center. It accelerated toward the northeast and became extratropical on September 6, dissipating shortly thereafter.

== Preparations ==
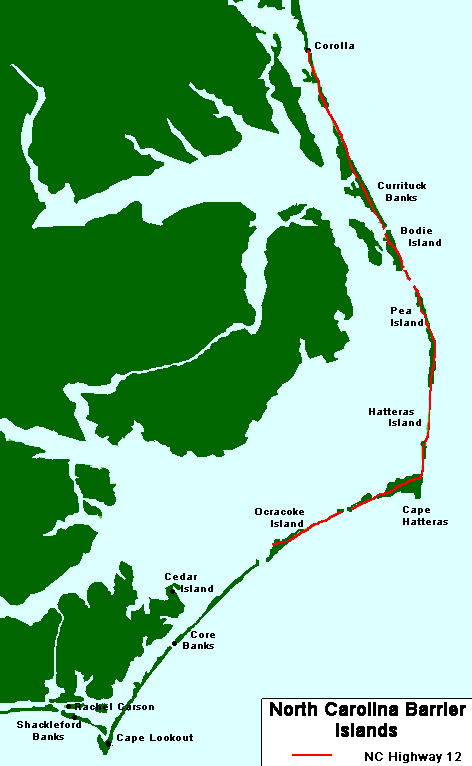
Map of the Outer Banks, with locations listed

The NHC forecasts for Emily were generally accurate. On August 29, two days before the storm's closest approach, the NHC issued a hurricane watch from Cape Romain, South Carolina, to Fenwick Island, Delaware, including the Albemarle and Pamlico sounds of North Carolina as well as the Chesapeake Bay south of the Patuxent River. The next day, the watch was discontinued south of Little River, South Carolina. A hurricane warning was issued from Bogue Inlet to the border of North Carolina and Virginia on August 30, and was extended a day later to Cape Henlopen, Delaware. The watches and warnings were canceled as Emily turned out to sea.

During the week when Emily approached shore, the North Carolina government was scheduled to have a two-day emergency management exercise involving a hurricane strike; the storm caused the exercise to be postponed. On August 29, a voluntary evacuation was issued for the Outer Banks, and within 36 hours of the storm's approach, a mandatory evacuation was issued for Ocracoke and Hatteras Island. A total of 160,000 people (mostly tourists) evacuated from the Outer Banks, representing about 90% of the population there. The evacuation was completed within 12 hours, expedited by highway patrol and making U.S. Route 158 and the Wright Memorial Bridge one-way inland. About 1,000 residents on Hatteras Island and another 600 on Ocracoke rode out the storm in their homes. The United States Coast Guard evacuated personnel to the mainland, leaving behind a skeleton crew to maintain their facilities. The National Park Service closed the campground on Ocracoke two days before the storm. Several towns in southeastern North Carolina were also evacuated, and schools closed across the region.

Because of the uncertainty in forecasting when and if Emily would make its northeast turn, Virginia Governor Douglas Wilder declared a state of emergency and put the National Guard on alert. In Virginia Beach, residents of seaside homes and low-lying areas were recommended to evacuate, while a mandatory evacuation was ordered for Tangier Island in the Chesapeake Bay. Residents in mobile homes and on campgrounds were also advised to seek shelter. At least 750 people left their homes, 711 of whom resided in storm shelters. The Norfolk International Airport was closed for 13 hours, and rail service was suspended. To the north, officials in Ocean City, Maryland, declared a phase-one emergency ahead of the storm; beaches were closed, and tourists were recommended to leave. About 100,000 people evacuated from the coast of Maryland; 3,600 stayed in storm shelters. In Delaware, 892 people used storm shelters after voluntarily evacuating. Beaches in New Jersey closed due to threatening waves. About 20,000 people also evacuated from Fire Island, New York. Across the Atlantic coast, 33 emergency shelters were opened in response to Emily, though most evacuees instead relied on hotels or the homes of friends and relatives to ride out the storm.

The Federal Emergency Management Agency (FEMA) assisted in coordinating preparations for Emily. The United States Department of Defense sent power equipment, previously used during the Great Flood of 1993, to Fort Bragg, while the United States Department of Agriculture stockpiled food in risk zones. Power companies deliberately shut off the power in the Outer Banks to reduce damage to the system and mitigate the risk of electrocutions. At Naval Station Norfolk, 28 ships sailed out to sea to ride out the storm; aircraft were evacuated, and nonessential personnel were sent home. The North Carolina government announced ahead of the storm that it would not create a State Disaster Fund, instead relying on private relief organizations such as the American Red Cross and the Salvation Army. The state's park service pre-positioned 60 members with chainsaws to help clear downed trees. Because Emily hit during the busy Labor Day weekend, the tourism industry suffered about $10 million in business losses. Many of the evacuees relocated to southeastern Virginia, which saw greatly increased business during the weekend.

== Impact ==
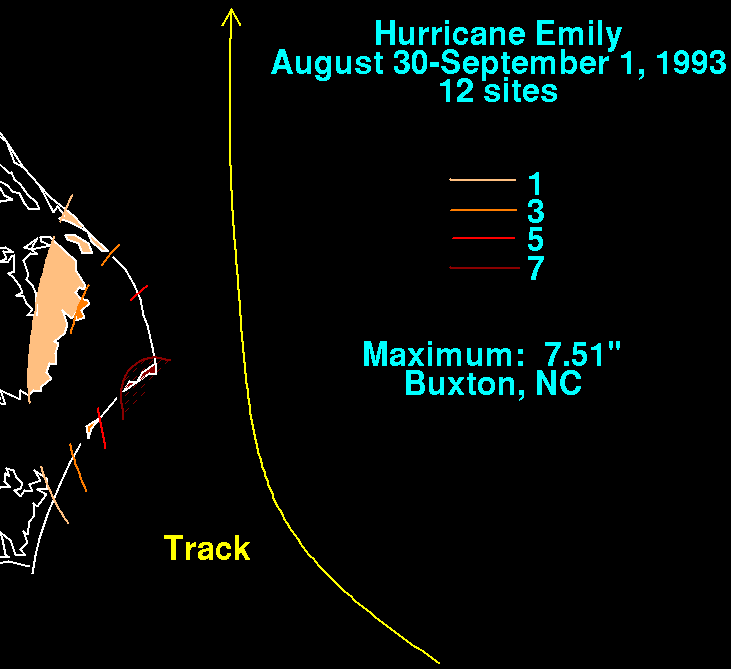
Rainfall amounts from Emily

=== North Carolina ===
As Emily approached the Outer Banks of North Carolina, Diamond Shoal Light off Cape Hatteras recorded 2-minute sustained winds of 99 mph (159 km/h), along with gusts of 147 mph (237 km/h). Closer to shore, surface winds reached 115 mph (185 km/h) in the Pamlico Sound. The National Weather Service in Buxton reported sustained winds of 60 mph (97 km/h), with gusts to 98 mph (158 km/h), before the wind recording instrument failed due to water intrusion. A reliable but unofficial wind station at a commercial building reported a gust of 107 mph (172 km/h). These high winds lasted for several hours due to the storm's slow movement. There were two possible tornadoes in the Outer Banks region. On the south side of Hatteras Island, the storm coincided with high tides, producing a peak storm surge of 10.2 ft (3.1 m) in Buxton. Large waves caused moderate beach erosion, comparable to that of a winter storm. The heaviest rainfall related to Emily occurred over the Outer Banks, where a peak total of 7.51 in (191 mm) was recorded in Buxton. Minimal rain fell farther inland, with only 1.00 in (25 mm) reported at Gum Neck in mainland Tyrrell County.

Overall damage from the storm was lighter than expected, largely confined to the barrier islands of Dare and Hyde counties. Severe flooding from the storm affected a 17 mi (27 km) stretch of the Hatteras Island. Coinciding with high tides during a full moon, the hurricane's winds pushed water from the Pamlico Sound to the south, lowering levels along the mainland and inundating the barrier islands; surge flooding was minor on the ocean side. At Frisco and Hatteras, water levels along the Pamlico Sound reached 8.5 ft (2.6 m) above normal—their highest in the 20th century, surpassing those in Hurricane Gloria eight years prior. These water levels may have been the highest in the region since the 1899 San Ciriaco hurricane. In Buxton, the waters rose 3 to 4 ft (0.9 to 1 m) per hour at one point, leaving behind flood marks as high as 10.54 ft (3.21 m). The entire villages of Avon and Hatteras were inundated. Only the highest dunes along the Cape Hatteras National Seashore remained dry, and a section of dunes just north of Buxton was nearly breached. The waters—1 to 2 ft (0.3 to 0.6 m) higher than the predicted 100-year flood—broke through windows and entered houses; some residents who did not exit their homes had to ride out the storm in their attics to escape the flooding. Officials at the Dare County Emergency Operations Center evacuated due to intrusion of floodwaters. The Cape Hatteras National Weather Service office was flooded for the first time since its inception in 1957, and sustained damage to its rain chart and an antenna. Many boats in marinas were wrecked, and hundreds of cars floated away from parking lots or streets; flooded police cars had their emergency lights activated after the wires were damaged. Farther south, impact from the storm was limited on Ocracoke Island.

Emily's winds destroyed several roofs and knocked down thousands of trees and power lines, with many signs and sheds damaged. All towns south of the Bonner Bridge were without power, affecting at least 1,500 people, and Buxton lost water supply after the main water line was damaged. The combination of strong winds and floods left 553 homes uninhabitable in the Outer Banks, with 168 houses completely destroyed, including three that were washed away. Six of the destroyed homes were owned by the Coast Guard. The heaviest damage was largely in older homes or structures not up to code. About 25% of the Hatteras population was left homeless. The Cape Hatteras School sustained about $3.1 million in damage, after flooding 4 ft (1.2 m) deep destroyed computers and textbooks. Tidal floods, sand, and debris forced authorities to close Highway 12. Traffic lights along the route were damaged, and downed trees blocked the road in two areas. Sinkholes, some the size of three cars, developed along the route. Throughout North Carolina, damage from the storm was estimated at $35 million, mostly on Hatteras Island and chiefly to the south of Avon. Rough surf killed two people in Nags Head, despite the beach being closed to swimming, and one person suffered injuries while escaping a flooded home.

=== Elsewhere ===
Outside of North Carolina, Emily produced gusts of 37 mph (59 km) at the Chesapeake Bay Bridge–Tunnel. To the north of the storm, Ocean City, Maryland, measured 2.80 in (71 mm) of precipitation. Above-normal tides were reported as far south as Charleston, South Carolina; high tides also spread farther north, with a storm surge of 1.2 ft (0.37 m) at the Chesapeake Bay Bridge–Tunnel and 0.6 ft (0.18 m) in Lewes, Delaware.

High waves caused beach erosion northward through Virginia. At Virginia Beach, the waves led to minor flooding along the Sandbridge section; rough surf and a strong undertow drowned one swimmer there. The storm triggered statewide power outages that affected about 5,000 residents, as well as the Hampton Roads Bridge–Tunnel. In Newport News, lightning set a roof on fire in the Lee Hall section of the city. Emily's light rains in the area were not enough to break a prolonged drought that plagued Virginia. Rough seas and high tides later caused coastal flooding along Fire Island in New York.

== Aftermath ==
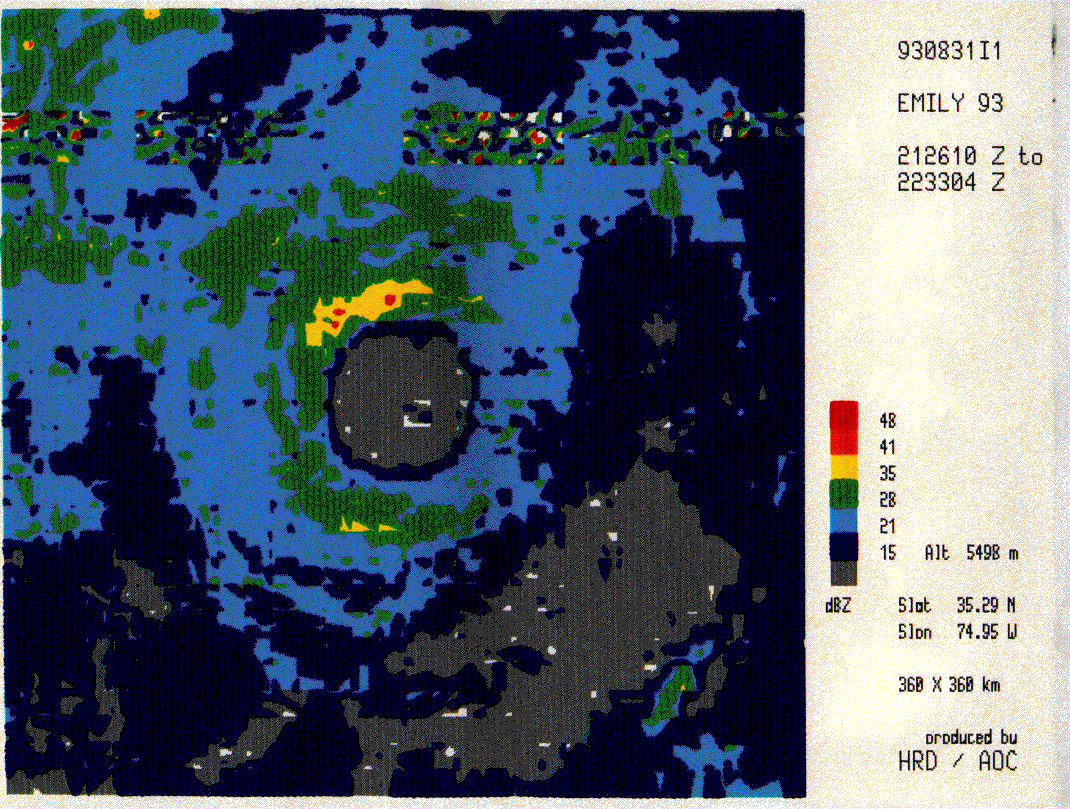
Radar image of Hurricane Emily on August 31, nearing the Outer Banks

As Emily's winds eased over land, various assessment teams left Fort Bragg, North Carolina, to determine the extent of damage. FEMA informed the North Carolina congressional delegation about the storm's threat to their constituents. The agency later received compliments for their timely preparations for storm-related operations. All airports on the Outer Banks were reopened by September 1. In response to the extensive scale of the power outages, power companies flew a helicopter over the region to assess the damage. The power was expected to be out for two weeks. Six emergency vehicles were sent to Dare County to provide drinking water.

On September 3, Governor Jim Hunt declared a state of disaster for North Carolina, while President Bill Clinton declared Dare County a disaster area a week later. This allowed residents there to apply for federal assistance, as well as local governments to request aid to rebuild public buildings. Operating out of Avon, FEMA distributed about $1 million in housing assistance to 444 people and provided $400,000 in individual grants to 153 applicants. The Small Business Administration received 812 applications for small business loans.

Shelters closed by September 1 and residents returned to their homes, although Hatteras Island remained off-limits to everyone but emergency workers for several days. Unemployment across Hatteras rose in the wake of the damage to local businesses, and many restaurants lost product when their refrigerators failed during the power outages. Residents piled debris from their damaged homes on roads, primarily Highway 12, and workers responded by clearing the debris. The highway was speedily reopened and repaired at a cost of around $1 million. Within two weeks of the storm, businesses resumed as cleaning work was under way, and the island was reopened to tourists. Clean-up operations in the region lasted weeks to months. In the three months after the storm, saltwater intrusion into the Cape Hatteras water supply boosted chlorine levels from 40 to 280 milligrams per litre (0.0014 to 0.0099 ounces per litre); it took another three months for the chlorine to decrease to normal concentrations. Around 50 homeowners affected by Emily raised their houses to prevent a recurrence, partially funded by flood insurance payments.

== See also ==
- List of North Carolina hurricanes
- Other storms of the same name
