= Tropical Storm Emily (2017) =

Atlantic tropical storm

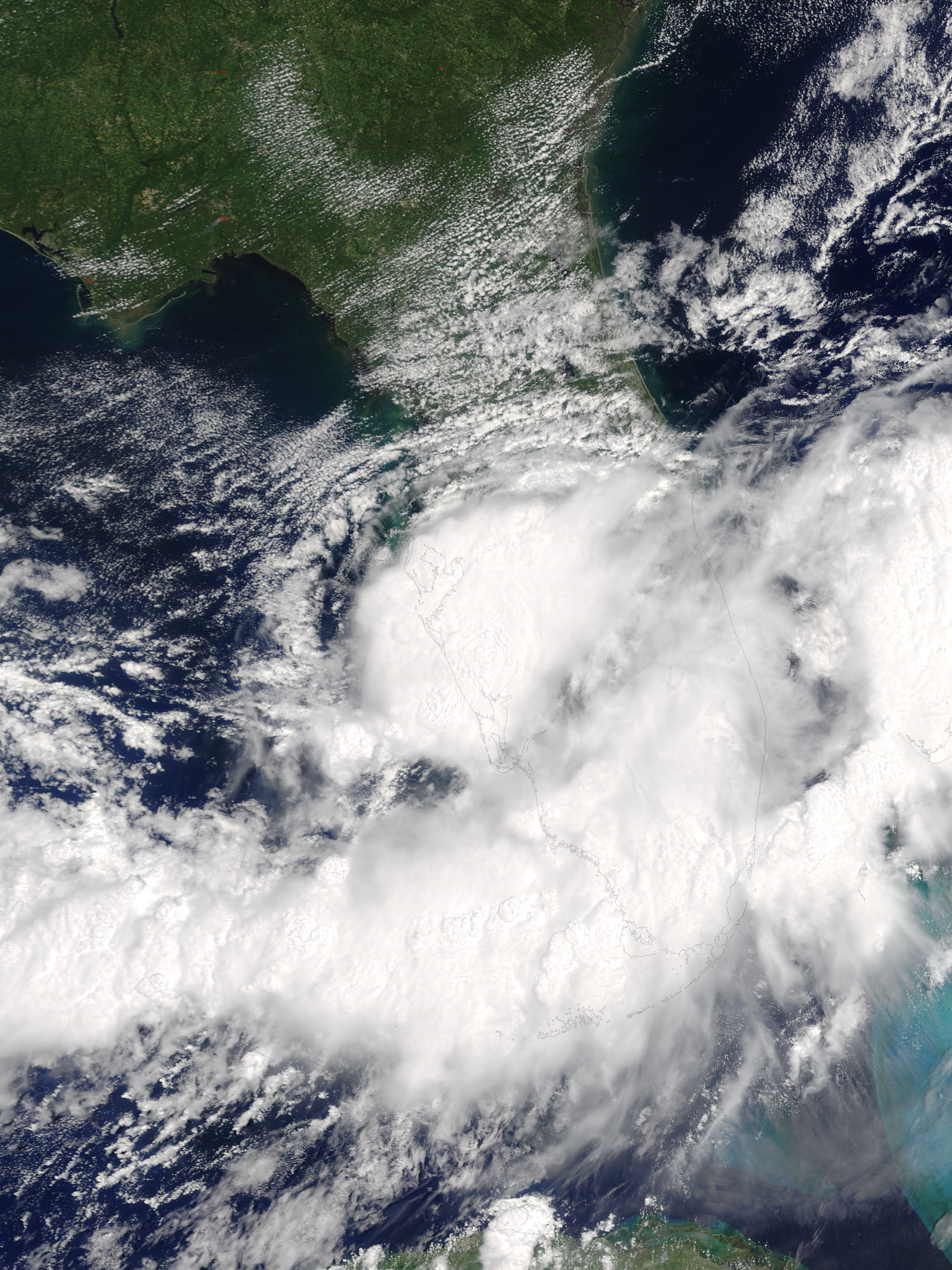
- Tropical Storm Emily shortly after landfall in Florida on July 31

Meteorological history
- Formed: July 30, 2017
- Dissipated: August 2, 2017

Tropical storm
- 1-minute sustained (SSHWS/NWS)
- Highest winds: 60 mph (95 km/h)
- Lowest pressure: 1001 mbar (hPa); 29.56 inHg

Overall effects
- Fatalities: None reported
- Damage: $10 million (2017 USD)
- Areas affected: Louisiana, Florida
- IBTrACS
- Part of the 2017 Atlantic hurricane season

Tropical Storm Emily was a rapidly-forming tropical cyclone that made landfall on the west coast of Florida. The fifth named storm of the 2017 Atlantic hurricane season, Emily formed from a small area of low pressure that developed along a cold front in late July 2017. Unexpectedly, the low rapidly organized and strengthened into a tropical depression on July 30, and then into a tropical storm early the next day. Emily continued to intensify as it moved eastward, peaking with maximum sustained winds of 60 mph (95 km/h) as it made landfall near Longboat Key on the western Florida coast. The cyclone weakened quickly into a tropical depression shortly after landfall as its circulation became increasingly disrupted. Emerging into the Atlantic Ocean on August 1, Emily continued to weaken as it accelerated northeastward, becoming post-tropical early on August 2.

Heavy rainfall produced by Emily caused widespread flooding in southwest Florida, causing road closures and water damage to homes and buildings. An EF0 tornado spawned by the storm destroyed two barns and numerous greenhouses, as well as causing an engineered wall to collapse. Overall damages are estimated at $10 million (USD).

== Meteorological history ==
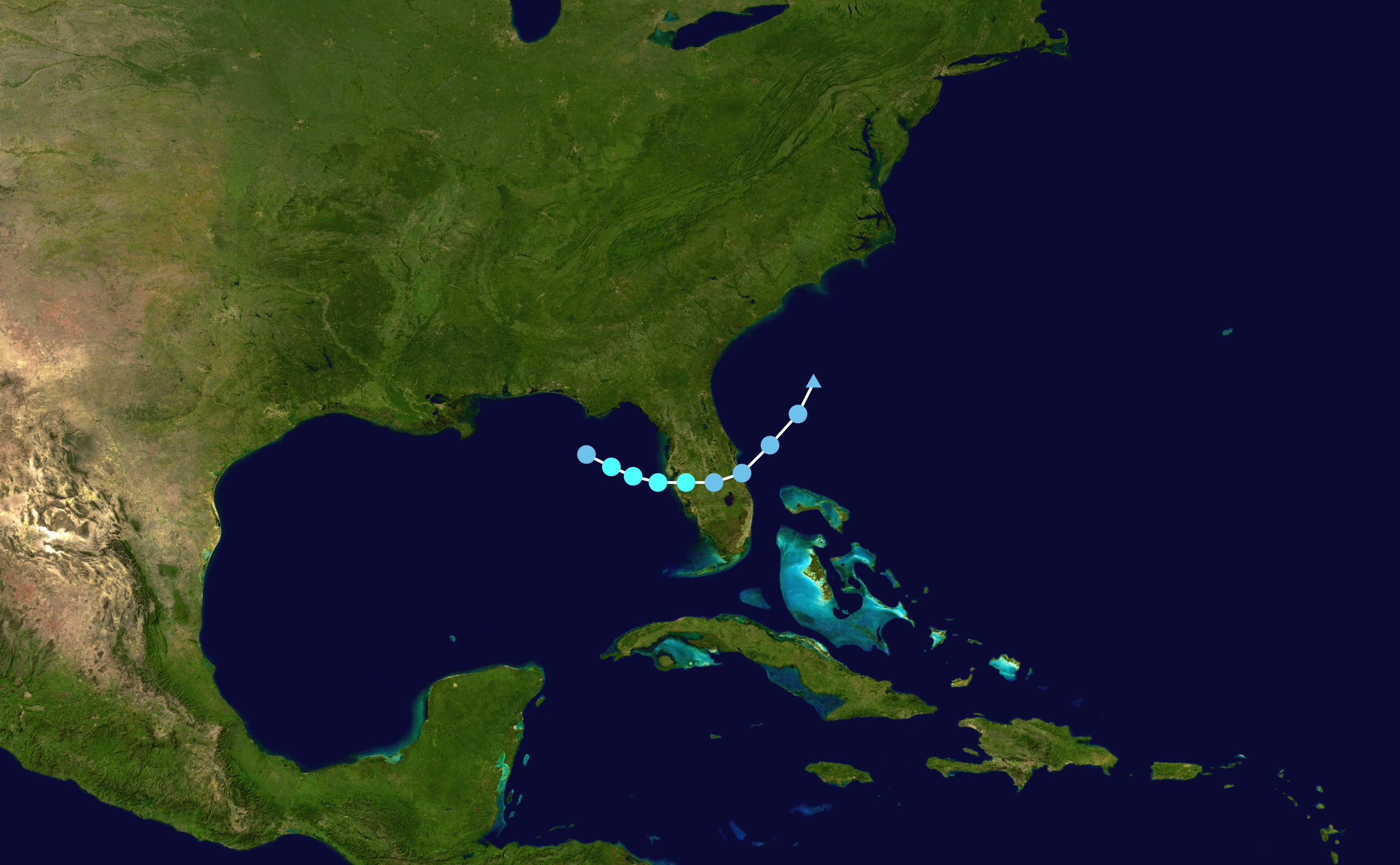
Map plotting the storm's track and intensity, according to the Saffir–Simpson scale Map key Saffir–Simpson scale Tropical depression (≤38 mph, ≤62 km/h) Tropical storm (39–73 mph, 63–118 km/h) Category 1 (74–95 mph, 119–153 km/h) Category 2 (96–110 mph, 154–177 km/h) Category 3 (111–129 mph, 178–208 km/h) Category 4 (130–156 mph, 209–251 km/h) Category 5 (≥157 mph, ≥252 km/h) Unknown Storm type Tropical cyclone Subtropical cyclone Extratropical cyclone, remnant low, tropical disturbance, or monsoon depression

On July 30, the National Hurricane Center (NHC) began monitoring an area of low pressure that was expected to develop along a dissipating cold front off the Louisiana coast for possible tropical cyclogenesis. Due to the low's proximity to land and only marginally favorable upper-level winds, development was expected to be slow to occur. Unexpectedly, a period of rapid organization occurred during the following few hours, and the low became a tropical depression at 18:00 UTC on July 30. Although the NHC did not forecast the depression to strengthen further, it instead rapidly strengthened into Tropical Storm Emily just four hours after formation. Despite environmental conditions being only marginally favorable for development, Emily continued to strengthen as it tracked eastward across the Gulf of Mexico. At 14:45 UTC, Emily made landfall near Longboat Key, Florida at peak intensity. Operationally, Emily was assessed to have peaked with maximum sustained winds of 45 mph (75 km/h) and a minimum pressure of 1005 mbar (hPa, 29.68 inHg). In post-season analysis, it was determined that it peaked with winds of 60 mph (95 km/h) and a minimum pressure of 1001 mbar (hPa, 29.56 inHg).

Shortly after landfall, Emily rapidly weakened into a tropical depression, and its structure degraded significantly. The small, disorganized system turned northeast and emerged into the Atlantic Ocean early on August 1; its center had become completely exposed by that time. Despite periodic bursts of deep convection near its center, Emily failed to restrengthen. By 00:00 UTC on August 2, Emily no longer possessed a warm core, and it was declared a post-tropical cyclone. Shortly afterward, the remnants of Emily dissipated off the Southeastern United States.

== Preparations and impact ==
Enhanced infrared satellite loop of Emily making landfall in the Tampa Bay Area on July 31

Upon the classification of Emily as a tropical depression, a tropical storm watch was issued for the west coast of Florida from the Anclote River to Englewood, which was later upgraded to a tropical storm warning and extended southward to Bonita Springs. Shortly after the classification of Emily as a tropical storm, Florida Governor Rick Scott declared a state of emergency for 31 counties to ensure residents were provided with the necessary resources.

Heavy rainfall produced by Emily caused widespread flooding in Polk and Pinellas counties, prompting the closure of roads and evacuation of a few homes. Coastal flooding was reported in Hillsborough, Manatee, and Sarasota counties, causing additional road closures. The storm spawned an EF0 tornado near Bradenton. The tornado was on the ground for about 1.3 mi (2.1 km) and destroyed two barns and a few greenhouses, while an engineered wall collapsed, leaving about $96,000 in damage. Torrential rains impacted parts of Miami Beach, with accumulations reaching 6.97 in (177 mm) in 3.5 hours, of which 2.17 in (55 mm) fell in just 30 minutes. Coinciding with high tide the deluge overwhelmed flood pumps, with three of them shutting down due to lightning-induced power outages, and resulted in significant flash floods. Multiple buildings suffered water damage, with some having 2.5 ft (0.76 m) of standing water. One person was hospitalized after becoming stuck in flood waters. Portions of Downtown Miami, such as Brickell, were also heavily affected; numerous vehicles became stranded in flooded roadways. The NHC later assessed the flooding in Miami to be indirectly related to Emily, as the storm was losing tropical characteristics at the time. Total damages from Emily are estimated to be about $10 million.

== See also ==
- Weather of 2017
- Tropical cyclones in 2017
- Other tropical cyclones named Emily
- Tropical Storm Barry (2007) - Rapidly-forming storm of similar intensity that affected the same areas.
- Hurricane Humberto (2007) - Another rapidly-forming Atlantic tropical cyclone.
- Tropical Storm Debby (2012) - Affected similar areas.
- Tropical Storm Mindy (2021) – Affected similar areas.
