= Morsy =

Morsy is a surname. Notable people with this surname include:

- Basem Morsy (born 1992), footballer
- Hanan Morsy, Egyptian economist
- Haydy Morsy (born 1999), Egyptian pentathlete
- Maya Morsy, political scientist
- Mohamed El-Morsy (born 1986), footballer
- Sam Morsy (born 1991), footballer
