= Grenada–United States relations =

- Grenada: United States

Grenada–United States relations are bilateral relations between Grenada and the United States. The United States recognized Grenada on 7 February 1974, the same day as Grenada got independence from the United Kingdom of Great Britain and Northern Ireland. These nations formally established diplomatic relations on 29 November 1974.

== History ==
Operation Urgent Fury

In October 1983, the United States led an invasion of Grenada, code named Urgent Fury, after the overthrow and summary execution of the leader of Grenada, Maurice Bishop, by the Deputy Prime Minister Bernard Coard.

The U.S. Government upgraded its representative office in Grenada to an embassy in February 1984. The U.S. Ambassador to Grenada is resident in Bridgetown, Barbados. The embassy in Grenada is staffed by a chargé d'affaires who reports to the ambassador in Bridgetown.

The U.S. Agency for International Development (USAID) played a major role in Grenada's development. In addition to the $45 million emergency aid for reconstruction from 2004's Hurricane Ivan, USAID provided more than $120 million in economic assistance from 1984 to 1993. About 25 Peace Corps volunteers in Grenada teach special education, remedial reading, and vocational training and assist with HIV/AIDS work. Grenada receives counter-narcotics assistance from the United States and benefits from U.S. military exercise-related construction and humanitarian civic action projects.

Grenada and the United States cooperate closely in fighting narcotics smuggling and other forms of transnational crime. In 1995, the United States and Grenada signed a maritime law enforcement treaty. In 1996, they signed a mutual legal assistance treaty and an extradition treaty as well as an over-flight/order-to-land amendment to the maritime law enforcement treaty. The United States continues to provide training, equipment, and materiel, including three vehicles in 2006, to Grenadian security and defense forces. Some U.S. military training is provided as well.

Grenada continues to be a popular destination for Americans. Of the 98,548 stayover visitors in 2005, 25,181 were U.S. citizens. It is estimated that some 2,600 Americans reside in the country, plus the 2,000 U.S. medical students who study at the St. George's University School of Medicine. (Those students are not counted as residents for statistical purposes.)

Principal U.S. Embassy officials include:

- Ambassador — Roger F. Nyhus since January 2024 (Resident in Barbados)
- Chargé d'Affaires (Grenada only) — Frances Herrera

== Bilateral agreements ==
Date	Agreement name	Law ref. number	Note
2 May 1986	Grenada Bilateral Investment Treaty	Entered into force on March 3, 1989	
1995	Maritime Law Enforcement Treaty		
1996	Mutual Legal Assistance Treaty		
1996	Extradition Treaty		

== Diplomacy ==
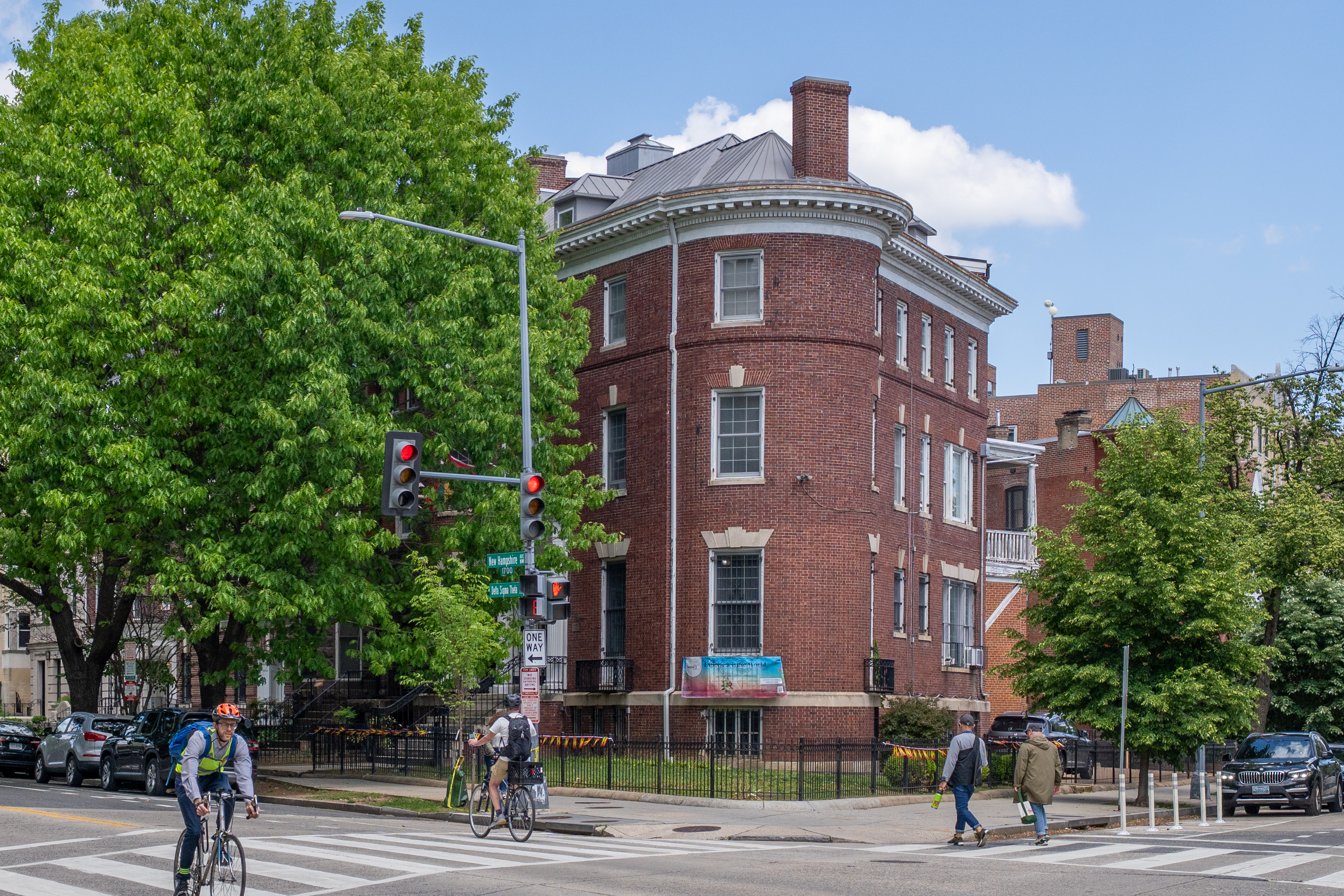
Embassy in Washington D.C.

All officials except the chargé d'affaires are located at the U.S. Embassy in Bridgetown, Barbados. The U.S. Embassy in Grenada is located in St. George's, Grenada.

Of Grenada

- Washington D.C. (Embassy)
- New York City (Honorary Consul)

Of United States of America

- St. George's (Embassy)

== See also ==
- North American Union
- North American Free Trade Agreement
- Free Trade Area of the Americas
- Third Border Initiative
- Caribbean Community
- Caribbean Basin Initiative (CBI)
- Caribbean Basin Trade Partnership Act
- Western Hemisphere Travel Initiative
- Foreign relations of the United States
- Foreign relations of Grenada
- Grenadian American
