= Tropical Storm Emily (2011) =

Atlantic tropical storm in 2011

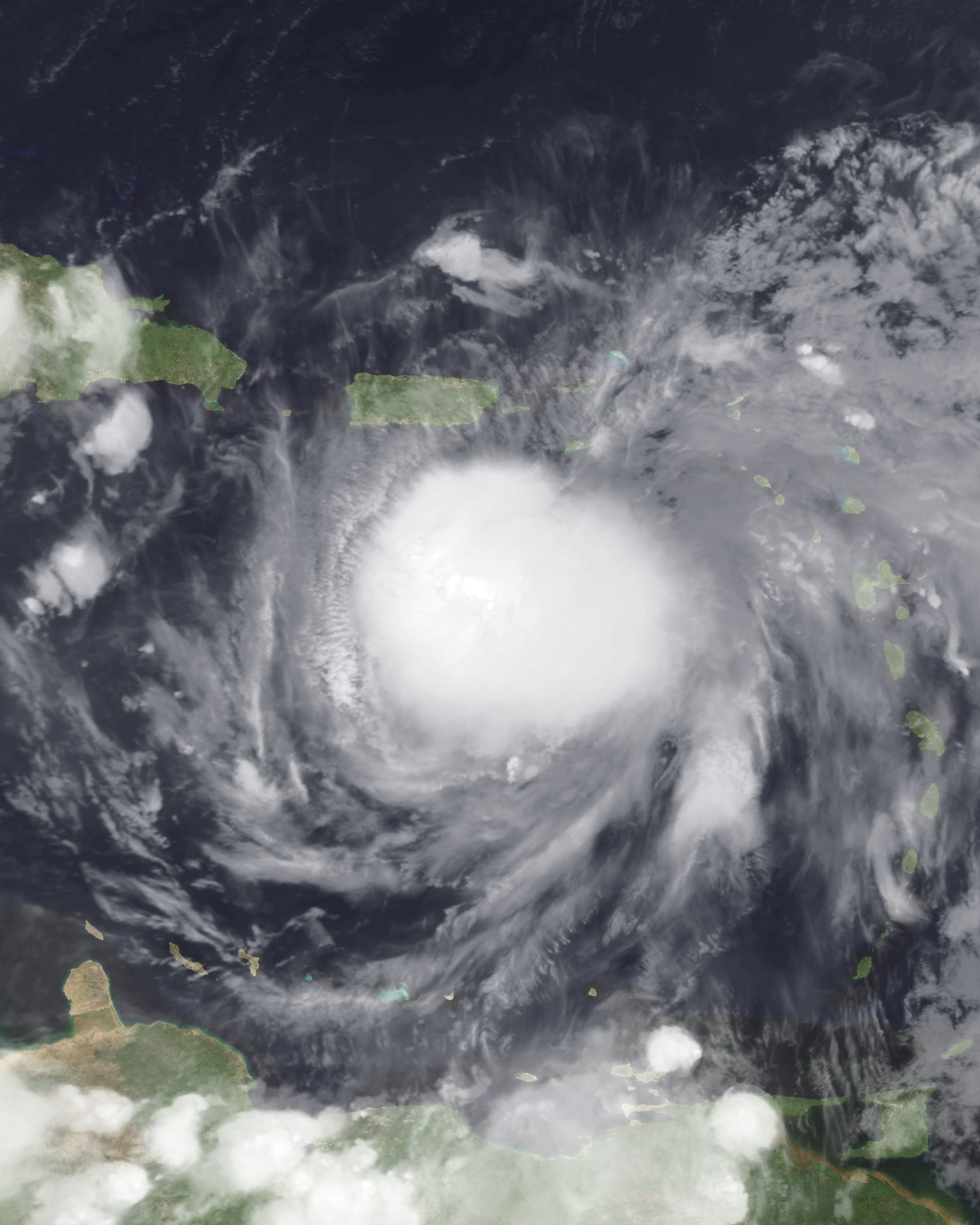
- Tropical Storm Emily at peak intensity in the Caribbean Sea on August 3

Meteorological history
- Formed: August 2, 2011
- Remnant low: August 7, 2011
- Dissipated: August 11, 2011

Tropical storm
- 1-minute sustained (SSHWS/NWS)
- Highest winds: 50 mph (85 km/h)
- Lowest pressure: 1003 mbar (hPa); 29.62 inHg

Overall effects
- Fatalities: 4 direct, 1 indirect
- Damage: $55 million (2011 USD)
- Areas affected: Antilles, Florida, Bahamas
- IBTrACS /
- Part of the 2011 Atlantic hurricane season

Tropical Storm Emily was a weak Atlantic tropical cyclone that brought torrential rains to much of the northern Caribbean in 2011. The fifth named storm of the annual hurricane season, Emily developed from a strong but poorly organized tropical wave that traversed the open Atlantic over the last week July. On August 1, it approached the Lesser Antilles and became more consolidated, producing inclement weather over many of the northern islands. Two days later, the disturbance's wind flow became more cyclonic with a defined center of circulation, which marked the formation of Tropical Storm Emily. The storm remained fairly irregular in structure, though generating strong thunderstorms and gusty winds along its path over the Caribbean Sea. On August 4, Emily was declassified as a tropical cyclone after the mountainous areas of Hispaniola further disrupted its diffuse circulation. Upon exiting the northeastern Caribbean on August 6, its remnants briefly regenerated into a tropical storm before dissipating completely the next day.

Despite the erratic structure of its wind flow, Emily brought severe weather to many Caribbean nations. Gusty winds felled trees and heavy rains caused widespread flooding throughout the Lesser Antilles. The most significant damage was confined to Martinique, where one death occurred. In Puerto Rico, flash floods affected residences and roads, leaving behind US$5 million in infrastructural damage. Even after Emily's dissipation, its remnants continued to produce prolonged rainfall over much of Hispaniola. Floods and mudslides in the Dominican Republic displaced over 7,000 residents and caused three people to drown in the capital of Santo Domingo. In neighboring Haiti, hundreds of houses were inundated in the department of Artibonite, forcing their inhabitants to evacuate. Minor wind damage occurred throughout the country's southern peninsula, and one person died in that region.

== Meteorological history ==
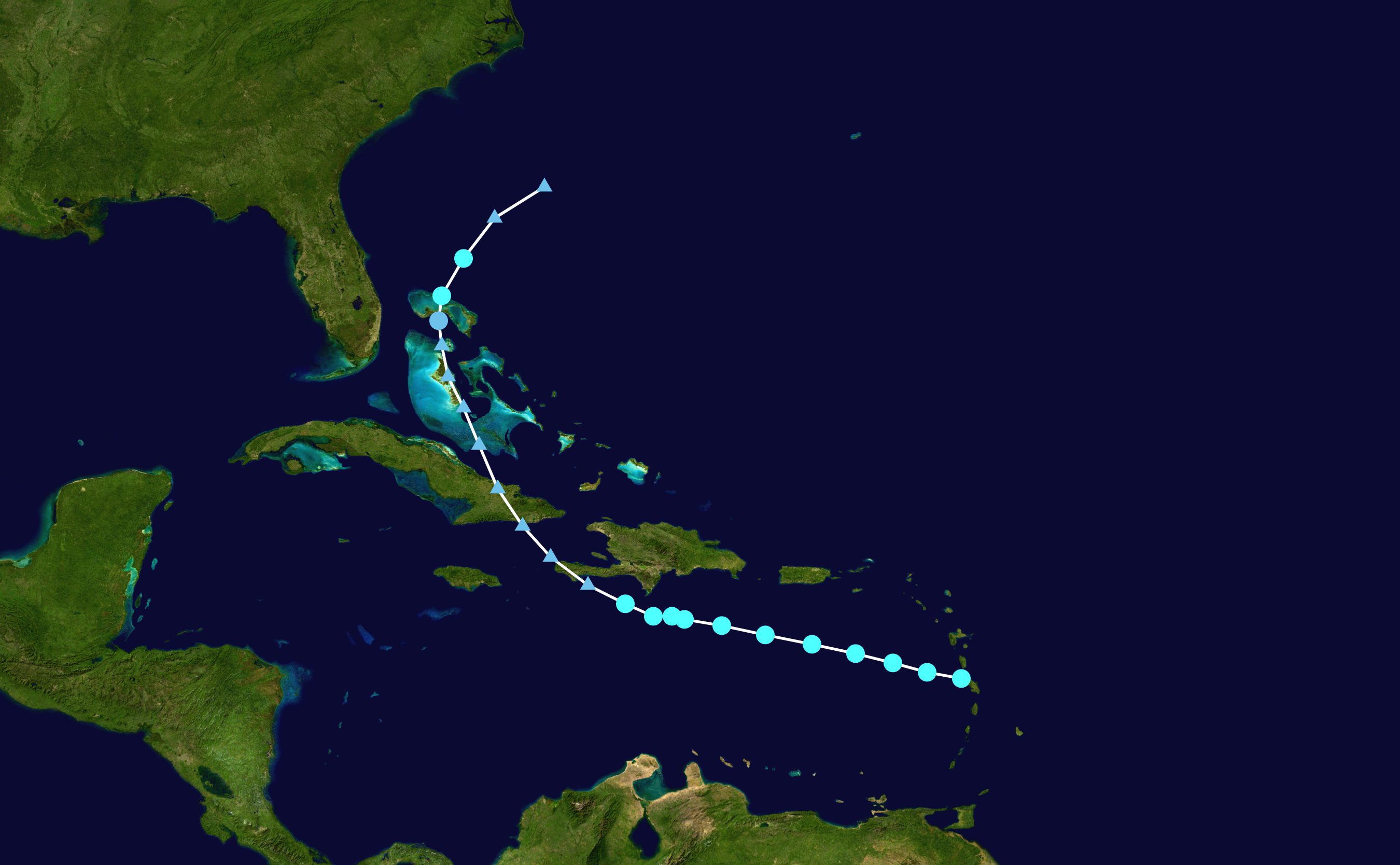
Map plotting the storm's track and intensity, according to the Saffir–Simpson scale Map key Saffir–Simpson scale Tropical depression (≤38 mph, ≤62 km/h) Tropical storm (39–73 mph, 63–118 km/h) Category 1 (74–95 mph, 119–153 km/h) Category 2 (96–110 mph, 154–177 km/h) Category 3 (111–129 mph, 178–208 km/h) Category 4 (130–156 mph, 209–251 km/h) Category 5 (≥157 mph, ≥252 km/h) Unknown Storm type Tropical cyclone Subtropical cyclone Extratropical cyclone, remnant low, tropical disturbance, or monsoon depression

The cyclogenesis of Tropical Storm Emily was complicated, extending over several days from late July into early August. An easterly tropical wave—an equatorward trough of low pressure—exited the west African coast in the fourth week of July, at which point it became largely embedded within the monsoon trough. Located to the south of a ridge of high pressure, the wave moved west-northwestward across the open Atlantic; it retained a broad circulation with little to no precipitation for a day or two. Over time, clusters of convection increased around the broad system, and it developed two distinct centers of circulation on July 30. During the morning of July 31, the large low markedly gained in organization, and the National Hurricane Center (NHC) noted it was close to becoming a tropical depression. Later that day, however, the main circulation became increasingly elongated; its westernmost component soon detached to form a separate tropical wave. This new disturbance featured widely scattered convection and rainbands, which briefly affected the Lesser Antilles. The next day, a new area of deep convection with a dominant center formed as the circulation became better defined. It passed through the Leeward Islands with some improvement in its structure, and the surface winds rose to near tropical storm force. A reconnaissance flight into the system revealed the circulation center had become well defined near the deep convection. The system was upgraded to tropical storm status and given the name Emily at 0000 UTC on August 2, when it was located to the south of Dominica. During the initial stages of its existence, the storm accelerated toward the west-northwest in response to the strong high pressure to its north.

Emily near Hispaniola on August 3.

With a relatively dry environment along its projected path, Emily was expected to strengthen only gradually until its predicted passage through the Greater Antilles. For several hours into August 2, the cyclone fluctuated little in intensity and organization as it developed banding features. Emily's appearance later improved on satellite images, and it developed a ragged central dense overcast; the NHC estimated that the storm had reached its peak sustained winds of 50 mph (80 km/h) by 0000 UTC on August 3. Nevertheless, reconnaissance revealed that its circulation remained poorly organized, and at the time, several forecast models even supported dissipation prior to landfall in Hispaniola. An increase in upper wind shear removed the deepest convection from the circulation center, and it would remain so for the rest of the storm's duration. On August 4, the cloud pattern and convective banding became better organized near the center as the upper outflow over the cyclone expanded. Emily proceeded to track just south of the Dominican Republic, where its weak circulation became increasingly disrupted due to the adjacent high terrain and increasing vertical wind shear. The cyclone accelerated over Hispaniola and degenerated into an open trough around 2100 UTC that day.

The remnant trough proceeded northwestward into the Bahamas, where the NHC assessed a high chance of redevelopment based on relenting upper wind shear. Over the next couple of days, it moved over the Bahamas and proceeded east of southern Florida. Late on August 6, the trough developed a new center of circulation and regenerated into a weak tropical depression by 1800 UTC near Grand Bahama. Emily briefly reattained tropical storm strength six hours later, although it once again dissipated to a remnant low the next day owing to increasing wind shear. The low took on an accelerated east-northeastward motion, bypassing Bermuda before heading eastward over the open Atlantic. It briefly retained a broad area of gale-force winds with deep convection, which prompted the NHC to remonitor the system. The combination of strong wind shear and its rapid forward speed inhibited significant development, and the remnant dissipated around 1200 UTC on August 11, about 980 mi (1,565 km) west of the Azores.

== Preparations ==
Because of the high potential for tropical cyclone development, Météo-France declared yellow cyclone alerts for Guadeloupe and Martinique, warning of imminent squally weather. Due to the presence of Emily, a state of emergency was declared for all of Puerto Rico. Officials ordered the preparation of over 400 storm shelters and ensured adequate water supply. The morning before the storm, government workers were dismissed, and national courtrooms remained closed. The United States Coast Guard issued a statement urging residents of Puerto Rico and the U.S. Virgin Islands to avoid recreational boating and swimming until Emily had passed. JetBlue Airways waived fees for flights into the Dominican Republic because of the inclement weather conditions. Four cruise ships, Oasis of the Seas, Freedom of the Seas, Carnival Dream and Carnival Liberty altered their courses through the Caribbean to avoid the storm.

In Haiti, about 630,000 people were still living in tents across areas devastated by the January 2010 earthquake prior to Emily's arrival. Due to the lack of sturdy structure to ride out a storm, fears arose over how they would fare with a tropical cyclone passing through the country. Emergency officials in the country set aside 22 large buses to evacuate thousands of people at the risk of flooding. Additionally, residents were urged to conserve food and safeguard their belongings. The United Nations placed 11,500 troops in the country on standby to assist in recovery efforts should they be necessitated. The International Federation of Red Cross and Red Crescent Societies also put emergency teams on standby to deliver food support in addition to the 125,000 people already assisted. In advance of the storm, authorities closed all airports and landing sites in country.

== Impact ==
=== Lesser Antilles ===
Intense rainbands produced gusty winds and heavy precipitation totaling to 5.90 in (150 mm) in Martinique, causing street flooding and inundating homes. Roughly 5,000 residences lost power at the height of the storm, though the outages were brief and confined to the southeast of the island. A large landslide occurred in the capital of Fort-de-France due to excessive soil saturation, prompting some 40 families to evacuate the area. Across the city, deep flood waters affected 29 houses; a man was electrocuted and killed by an exposed wire in his flooded home.

In Guadeloupe, damage from the storm was limited; potent gusts uprooted numerous trees and blew debris onto streets throughout Basse-Terre. One road was blocked off to traffic during its passage as a precautionary measure, but was reopened soon thereafter. Gale-force winds downed some electricity lines in Saint Kitts and Nevis, causing two island-wide outages. The storm enhanced moisture to produce intermittent torrents over the Virgin Islands, with localized totals of no more than 1 inch (25 mm). Winds in the area were also limited; the highest gust was experienced on Buck Island, measuring 52 mph (83 km/h).

=== Puerto Rico ===
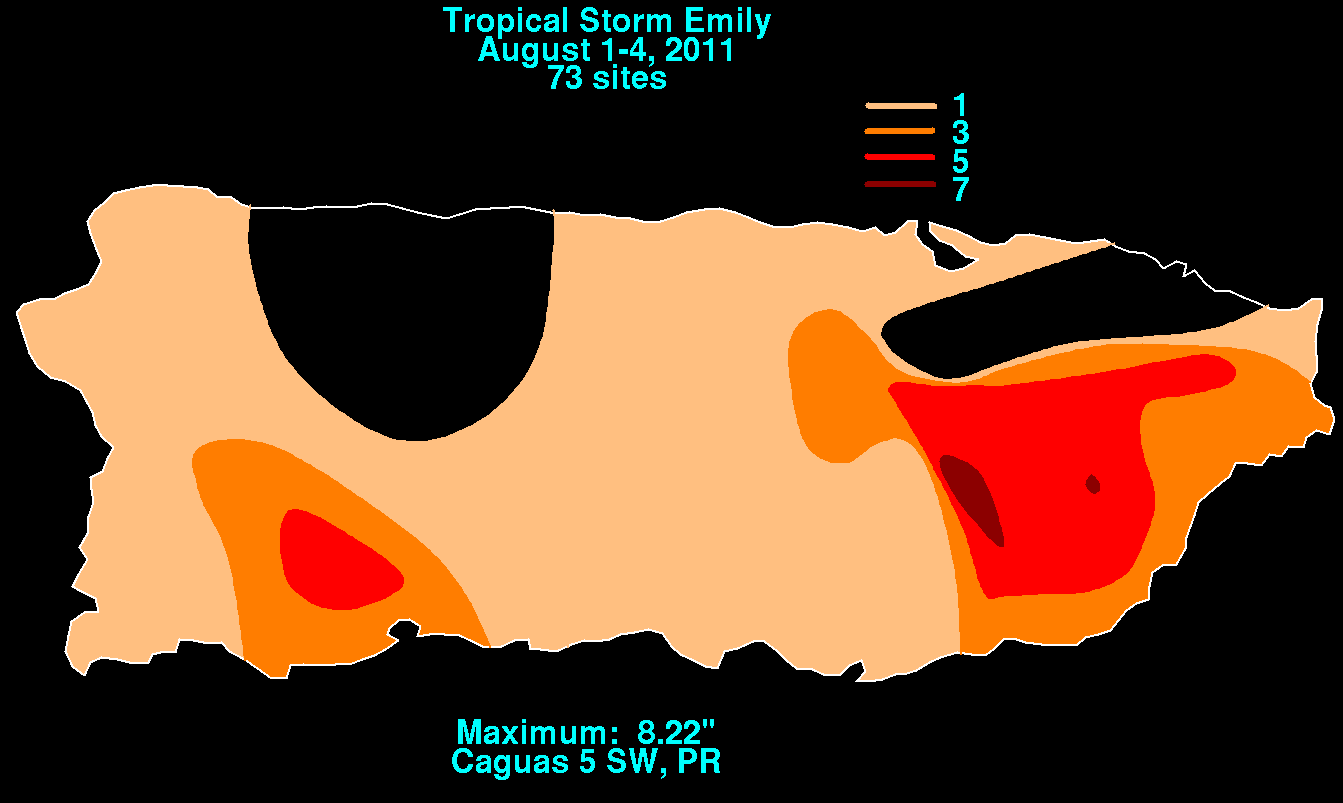
Rainfall caused by Emily in Puerto Rico

While moving little near Puerto Rico, Emily brought prolonged tropical storm conditions to many parts of the island. The heaviest rainfall occurred in southern regions; Caguas recorded a total of 8.22 in (209 mm) of rain during the storm. High winds damaged an electrical grid, cutting off power to about 18,500 customers; roughly 6,000 people were left without drinking water during the storm. Dozens of residents evacuated to shelters, in particular those living near risk zones. Torrential rains of up to 10 inches (250 mm) overflowed three rivers, which resulted in the flooding and subsequent closure of the PR-31 highway and PRI-3 intersection. Throughout the island, multiple other roads were made impassable by landslides and fallen objects; infrastructural damage surmounted $5 million, according to preliminary estimates. The two-day suspension of about 280,000 employees—about 30 percent of the territory's workforce—affected the local economy significantly, with capital losses estimated at $55 million.

In San Lorenzo, 25 families became isolated when a bridge threatened to collapse. Flooded homes and cluttered streets were reported in Ceiba, with one residential gate collapsing in the municipality. The agricultural sector also sustained losses from the storm; in Yabucoa, heavy rains washed out 1,200 acres (490 ha) of banana seedlings.

=== Hispaniola ===
Wettest tropical cyclones and their remnants the Dominican Republic Highest-known totals
| Precipitation | | | Storm | Location | Ref. |
| Rank | mm | in | Storm | Location | Ref. |
|---|---|---|---|---|---|
| 1 | 1001.5 | 39.43 | Flora 1963 | Polo Barahona | |
| 2 | 905.0 | 35.63 | Noel 2007 | Angelina | |
| 3 | 598.0 | 23.54 | Cleo 1964 | Polo | |
| 4 | 528.0 | 20.79 | Emily 2011 | Neyba | |
| 5 | 505.2 | 19.89 | Jeanne 2004 | Isla Saona | |
| 6 | 479.8 | 18.89 | Inez 1966 | Polo | |
| 7 | 445.5 | 17.54 | Hurricane Four 1944 | Hondo Valle | |
| 8 | 391.4 | 15.41 | Hurricane Five 1935 | Barahona | |
| 9 | 359.9 | 14.17 | Hanna 2008 | Oveido | |
| 10 | 350.0 | 13.78 | T.S. One 1948 | Bayaguana | |

Albeit disorganized, Emily and its remnants dropped extensive precipitation across the Dominican Republic, with maximum totals of up to 21 inches (528 mm) recorded in Neiba. Among other consequences, severe flooding and isolated mudslides left 56 communities isolated from surrounding areas. The storm displaced up to 7,534 people throughout the country, of which 1,549 sought refuge in storm shelters. Consecutive hours of rainfall resulted in the overflow of some rivers, although no significant damage was reported to adjacent areas. Offshore, squalls generated rough waves that briefly affected boating operations and oceanside homes. To the east of Santo Domingo, two men drowned after getting caught in a swollen river. A third drowning fatality occurred elsewhere in the capital due to flooding.

Owing to the timing of its dissipation, Emily spared neighboring Haiti from the devastation initially anticipated. At least 235 people in Jacmel and Tabarre, as well as 65 prisoners from Gonaïves and Miragoâne, required evacuation at the height of the storm. In Artibonite, civil protection teams evacuated roughly 300 residents. Rainfall triggered floods that damaged over 300 homes throughout the country, while several cholera treatment centers were destroyed. At the risk of new outbreaks, special sterilizers were distributed to sanitize possibly contaminated waters. A body was recovered from a ravine near Les Cayes, but the exact cause of death was disputed; another person in the area sustained injuries after being hit by a fallen tree. High winds caused some property damage in Léogâne and Jacmel.

=== Elsewhere ===
The successor trough to Emily produced torrential rains over eastern Cuba, causing some rivers to overflow. Damaging flood waters spread across roads in Santiago de Cuba, where 37 homes were affected by mud. While regenerating into a tropical depression, Emily dropped prolonged rainfall in the Bahamas; a severe thunderstorm warning was accordingly issued for Grand Bahama and adjacent waters. Precipitation totals of up to 7.9 in (200 mm) were recorded during the time.

== See also ==
- Other tropical cyclones named Emily
- Tropical Storm Alpha (2005)
- Tropical Storm Erika (2015)
