= List of storms named Emily =

The name Emily has been used for 15 tropical cyclones worldwide. Eight were in the Atlantic Ocean, five in the East Pacific Ocean, and two in the Australian region.

In the Atlantic:

- Hurricane Emily (1981) – crossed Bermuda
- Hurricane Emily (1987) – caused considerable damage to Saint Vincent, Dominican Republic, and Bermuda
- Hurricane Emily (1993) – came near Hatteras Island, North Carolina
- Tropical Storm Emily (1999) – no threat to land, absorbed by Hurricane Cindy
- Hurricane Emily (2005) – Category 5 hurricane, caused damage in Grenada, and Quintana Roo, and Tamaulipas in Mexico
- Tropical Storm Emily (2011) – caused minor damage throughout the Caribbean
- Tropical Storm Emily (2017) – made landfall in Tampa, Florida
- Tropical Storm Emily (2023) – no threat to land

In the East Pacific:

- Hurricane Emily (1963) – no threat to land
- Hurricane Emily (1965) – paralled the Baja California peninsula
- Tropical Storm Emily (1969) – developed from a low that caused flooding in southwestern Mexico
- Hurricane Emily (1973) – Category 4 hurricane that moved out to sea
- Tropical Storm Emily (1977) – no threat to land

In the Australian region:

- Tropical Depression Emily (1962) – short-lived storm, no threat to land
- Cyclone Emily (1972) – off Queensland, eight lives lost at sea

== See also ==
- Tropical Storm Emilie (1977) – a South-West Indian Ocean tropical cyclone with a similar name
