= Hanan Morsy =

Egyptian economist

- Born: Egypt
- Education: The American University in Cairo (BSc, Economics & Computer Science); University of California, Davis (MA, Economics); George Washington University (PhD, Economics)
- Occupation: Economist
- Title: Deputy Executive Secretary and Chief Economist of the United Nations Economic Commission for Africa

Hanan Morsy is an Egyptian economist, who serves as the Deputy Executive Secretary and Chief Economist of the United Nations Economic Commission for Africa, based in Addis Ababa, Ethiopia, since January 2022.

== Background and education ==
A native of Cairo, Morsy holds a BSc in Economics and Computer Science, from The American University in Cairo. Her degree of Master of Arts in Economics was awarded by the University of California, Davis. She went on to obtain a Doctor of Philosophy in Economics, from George Washington University, in Washington, D.C., United States.

== Career ==
Immediately prior to her current assignment, Morsy was the Director of Macroeconomic Policy, Forecasting and Research at the African Development Bank (AfDB), based in Abidjan, Ivory Coast, effective 2017. Prior to that, she was the Lead Economist for the Southern and Eastern Mediterranean Region at The European Bank for Reconstruction and Development, based in London, from 2012 until 2017.

Before that, she worked at the International Monetary Fund, from 2003 until 2012, serving in various roles, including as Advisor to Executive Director. She also served in different departments of the IMF including, Fiscal Affairs, Middle East and Central Asia, European, and Monetary and Capital Markets.

At the AfDB, she spearheaded research on debt and gender issues.

== Other responsibilities ==
As of February 2020, Morsy is a visiting scholar at the Kennedy School at Harvard University. She is also a member of the Board of Trustees at the London Middle East Institute and a Research Fellow at the Economic Research Forum.

== Honors and awards ==
In February 2020, the Egyptian magazine Amwal Al Ghad named Morsy among the 50 most influential Egyptian women.

She is credited with the production of the AfDB's African Economic Outlook 2020. The publication focuses on preparing Africa's workforce for the future. It provides evidence-based recommendations on enhancing skills and education. It also recommends methods to mobilize additional resources to address the education financing gap, and the improvement of spending efficiency.

An announcement was made by the International Economic Association honoring Morsy and nine economists with the IEA Fellow Award 2024.

== See also ==
- Amira Elmissiry
- Frannie Léautier
