= Outline of Grenada =

Country in the Caribbean Islands

The Flag of Grenada

The location of Grenada

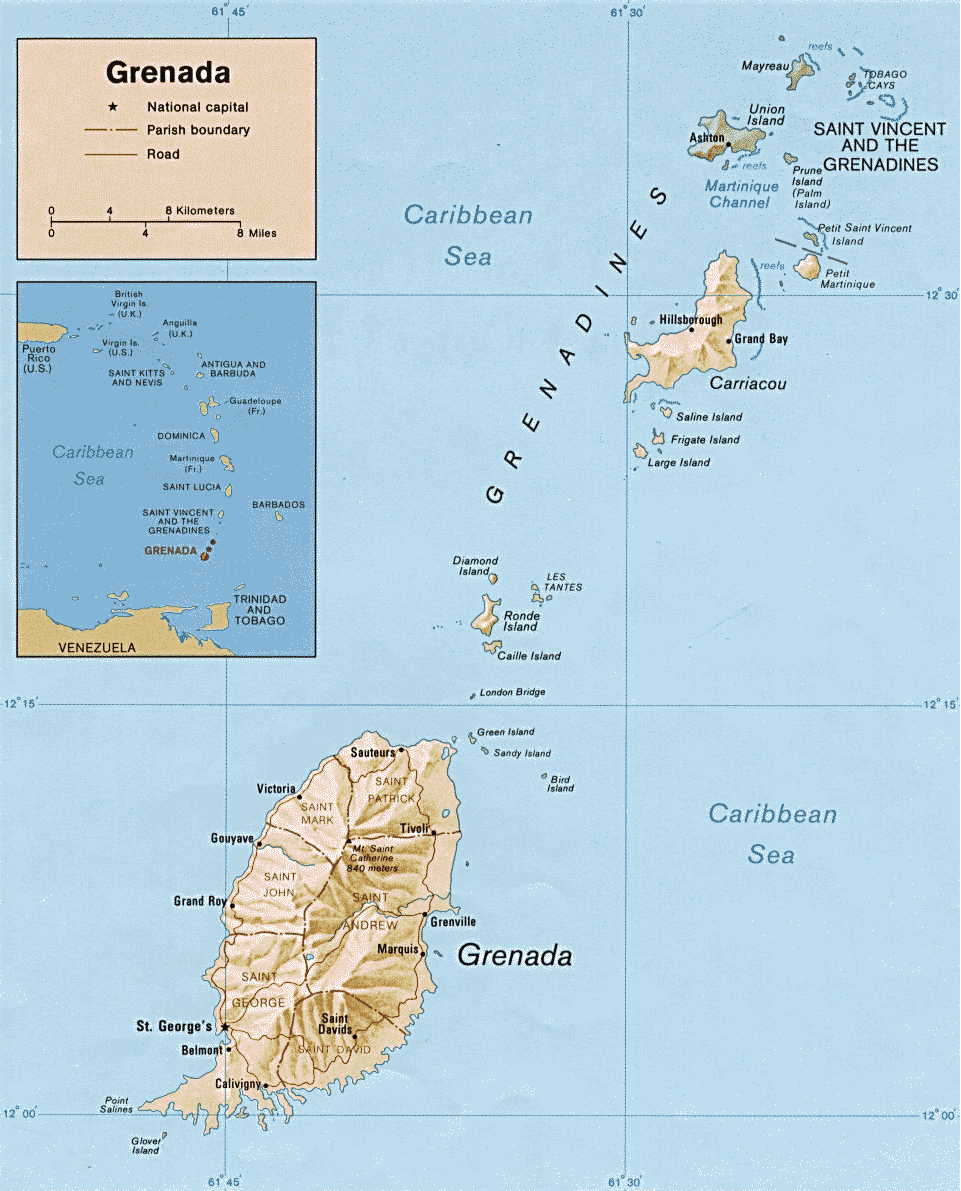
An enlargeable relief map of Grenada

The following outline is provided as an overview of and topical guide to Grenada:

Grenada – sovereign island nation that comprises the Island of Grenada and the southern Grenadines in the southeastern Caribbean Sea. Grenada is located north of Trinidad and Tobago and Venezuela, and south of Saint Vincent and the Grenadines. The national bird of Grenada is the critically endangered Grenada dove. Popularly known as the "Spice Isle" because of an abundance of locally grown spices and a culture of music, dance and food built into the image of "spice of life", Grenada is also a well-known tourist destination. It is one of the smallest independent nations in the Western Hemisphere.

== General reference ==
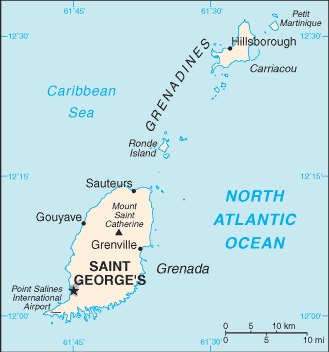
An enlargeable basic map of Grenada

- Pronunciation: /ɡrəˈneɪdə/
- Common English country name: Grenada
- Official English country name: Grenada
- Common endonym(s):
- Official endonym(s):
- Adjectival(s): Grenadian
- Demonym(s):
- Etymology: Name of Grenada
- International rankings of Grenada
- ISO country codes: GD, GRD, 308
- ISO region codes: See ISO 3166-2:GD
- Internet country code top-level domain: .gd

== Geography of Grenada ==
Geography of Grenada

- Grenada is...
  - an island
  - a country
    - an island country
    - a nation state
    - a Commonwealth realm
- Location:
  - Northern Hemisphere and Western Hemisphere
    - North America (though not on the mainland)
  - Atlantic Ocean
    - North Atlantic
      - Caribbean
        - Antilles
          - Lesser Antilles
            - Windward Islands
  - Time zone: Eastern Caribbean Time (UTC-04)
  - Extreme points of Grenada
    - High: Mount Saint Catherine 840 m (2,756 ft)
    - Low: Caribbean Sea 0 m
  - Land boundaries: none
  - Coastline: 121 km
- Population of Grenada: 106,000 – 185th most populous country
- Area of Grenada: 344 km^{2}
- Atlas of Grenada

=== Environment of Grenada ===
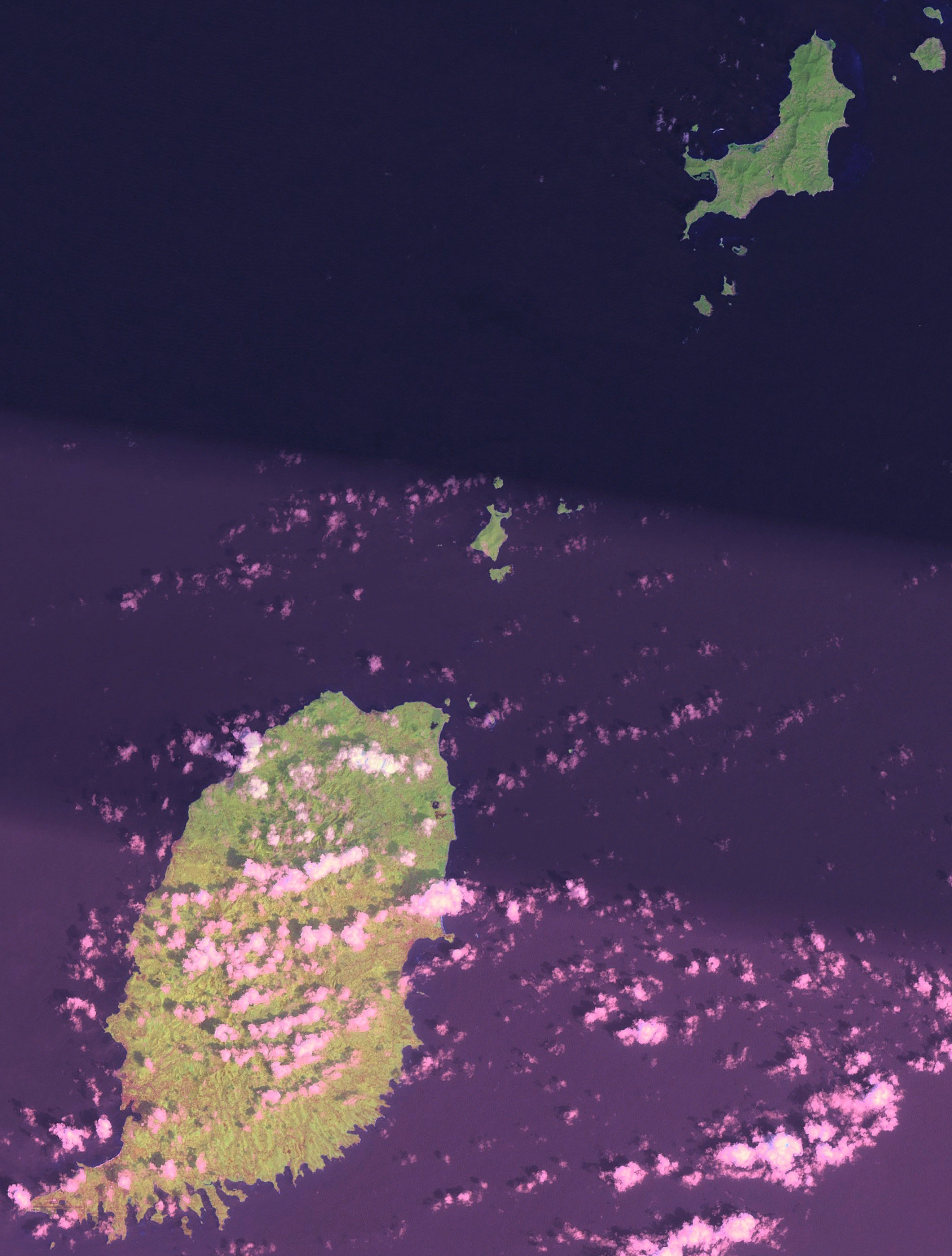
An enlargeable satellite image of Grenada

- Climate of Grenada
- Renewable energy in Grenada
- Geology of Grenada
- Protected areas of Grenada
  - Biosphere reserves in Grenada
  - National parks of Grenada
- Wildlife of Grenada
  - Fauna of Grenada
    - Birds of Grenada
    - Mammals of Grenada

==== Natural geographic features of Grenada ====
- Fjords of Grenada
- Glaciers of Grenada
- Islands of Grenada
- Lakes of Grenada
- Mountains of Grenada
  - Volcanoes in Grenada
- Rivers of Grenada
  - Waterfalls of Grenada
- Valleys of Grenada
- World Heritage Sites in Grenada: None

=== Regions of Grenada ===
Regions of Grenada

==== Ecoregions of Grenada ====
List of ecoregions in Grenada

==== Administrative divisions of Grenada ====
None

===== Municipalities of Grenada =====
- Capital of Grenada: St. George's
- Cities of Grenada

=== Demography of Grenada ===
Demographics of Grenada

== Government and politics of Grenada ==
- Form of government: parliamentary representative democratic monarchy
- Capital of Grenada: St. George's
- Elections in Grenada
- Political parties in Grenada

=== Branches of the government of Grenada ===
Government of Grenada

==== Executive branch of the government of Grenada ====
- Head of state: King of Grenada, represented by the Governor-General of Grenada
- Head of government: Prime Minister of Grenada,
- Cabinet of Grenada

==== Legislative branch of the government of Grenada ====
- Parliament of Grenada (bicameral)
  - Upper house: Senate of Grenada
  - Lower house: House of Representatives of Grenada

==== Judicial branch of the government of Grenada ====
Court system of Grenada

- Supreme Court of Grenada

=== Foreign relations of Grenada ===
Foreign relations of Grenada

- Diplomatic missions in Grenada
- Diplomatic missions of Grenada

==== International organization membership ====
Grenada is a member of:

- African, Caribbean, and Pacific Group of States (ACP)
- Agency for the Prohibition of Nuclear Weapons in Latin America and the Caribbean (OPANAL)
- Caribbean Community and Common Market (Caricom)
- Caribbean Development Bank (CDB)
- Commonwealth of Nations
- Food and Agriculture Organization (FAO)
- Group of 77 (G77)
- International Bank for Reconstruction and Development (IBRD)
- International Civil Aviation Organization (ICAO)
- International Criminal Police Organization (Interpol)
- International Development Association (IDA)
- International Federation of Red Cross and Red Crescent Societies (IFRCS)
- International Finance Corporation (IFC)
- International Fund for Agricultural Development (IFAD)
- International Labour Organization (ILO)
- International Maritime Organization (IMO)
- International Monetary Fund (IMF)
- International Olympic Committee (IOC)
- International Red Cross and Red Crescent Movement (ICRM)
- International Telecommunication Union (ITU)
- International Trade Union Confederation (ITUC)
- Multilateral Investment Guarantee Agency (MIGA)
- Nonaligned Movement (NAM)
- Organisation for the Prohibition of Chemical Weapons (OPCW)
- Organization of American States (OAS)
- Organization of Eastern Caribbean States (OECS)
- United Nations (UN)
- United Nations Conference on Trade and Development (UNCTAD)
- United Nations Educational, Scientific, and Cultural Organization (UNESCO)
- United Nations Industrial Development Organization (UNIDO)
- Universal Postal Union (UPU)
- World Federation of Trade Unions (WFTU)
- World Health Organization (WHO)
- World Intellectual Property Organization (WIPO)
- World Trade Organization (WTO)

=== Law and order in Grenada ===
Law of Grenada

- Cannabis in Grenada
- Constitution of Grenada
- Crime in Grenada
- Human rights in Grenada
  - LGBT rights in Grenada
  - Freedom of religion in Grenada
- Law enforcement in Grenada

=== Military of Grenada ===
Military of Grenada

- Command
  - Commander-in-chief:
    - Ministry of Defence of Grenada
- Forces
  - Army of Grenada
  - Navy of Grenada
  - Air Force of Grenada
  - Special forces of Grenada
- Military history of Grenada
- Military ranks of Grenada

=== Local government in Grenada ===
Local government in Grenada

== History of Grenada ==
History of Grenada

- Timeline of the history of Grenada
- Current events of Grenada
- Military history of Grenada

== Culture of Grenada ==
Culture of Grenada

- Architecture of Grenada
- Cuisine of Grenada
- Festivals in Grenada
- Languages of Grenada
- Media in Grenada
  - List of newspapers in Grenada
- National symbols of Grenada
  - Coat of arms of Grenada
  - Flag of Grenada
  - National anthem of Grenada
- People of Grenada
- Public holidays in Grenada
- Records of Grenada
- Religion in Grenada
  - Christianity in Grenada
  - Hinduism in Grenada
  - Islam in Grenada
  - Judaism in Grenada
  - Sikhism in Grenada
- World Heritage Sites in Grenada: None

=== Art in Grenada ===
- Art in Grenada
- Cinema of Grenada
- Literature of Grenada
- Music of Grenada
- Television in Grenada
- Theatre in Grenada

=== Sports in Grenada ===
Sports in Grenada

- Football in Grenada
- Grenada at the Olympics

== Economy and infrastructure of Grenada ==
Economy of Grenada

- Economic rank, by nominal GDP (2007): 174th (one hundred and seventy fourth)
- Agriculture in Grenada
- Banking in Grenada
  - National Bank of Grenada
- Communications in Grenada
  - Internet in Grenada
- Companies of Grenada
- Currency of Grenada: Dollar
  - ISO 4217: XCD
- Energy in Grenada
  - Energy policy of Grenada
  - Oil industry in Grenada
- Mining in Grenada
- Tourism in Grenada
  - Visa policy of Grenada
- Transport in Grenada
- Grenada Stock Exchange

== Education in Grenada ==
Education in Grenada

== Infrastructure of Grenada ==
- Health care in Grenada
- Transportation in Grenada
  - Airports in Grenada
  - Rail transport in Grenada
  - Roads in Grenada

== See also ==
Grenada

- Index of Grenada-related articles
- List of Grenada-related topics
- List of international rankings
- Member state of the Commonwealth of Nations
- Member state of the United Nations
- Monarchy of Grenada
- Outline of geography
- Outline of North America
- Outline of the Caribbean
