= Index of Grenada-related articles =

The location of Grenada

The following is an alphabetical list of topics related to the nation of Grenada.

== 0–9 ==
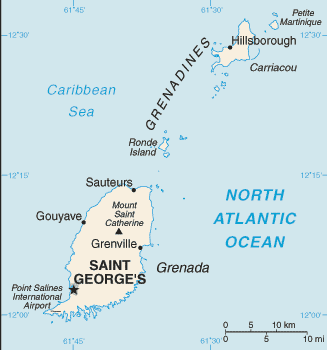
A map of Grenada

- .gd – Internet country code top-level domain for Grenada
- 1983 Invasion of Grenada

== A ==
- Afro-Grenadians
- Air Force of Grenada
- Airports in Grenada
- Americas
  - North America
    - North Atlantic Ocean
      - West Indies
        - Caribbean Sea
          - Antilles
            - Lesser Antilles
              - Islands of Grenada
- Anglo-America
- Antilles
- Atlantic Ocean
- Atlas of Grenada

== B ==
- Birds of Grenada
- British West Indies

== C ==
- Capital of Grenada: Saint George's
- Caribbean
- Caribbean Community (CARICOM)
- Caribbean Sea
- Categories:
  - Category:Grenada
    - Category:Buildings and structures in Grenada
    - Category:Communications in Grenada
    - Category:Culture of Grenada
    - Category:Economy of Grenada
    - Category:Education in Grenada
    - Category:Environment of Grenada
    - Category:Geography of Grenada
    - Category:Government of Grenada
    - Category:Grenada stubs
    - Category:Grenada-related lists
    - Category:Grenadian people
    - Category:Society of Grenada
    - Category:Health in Grenada
    - Category:History of Grenada
    - Category:Politics of Grenada
    - Category:Sport in Grenada
    - Category:Transport in Grenada
  - commons:Category:Grenada
- Cities of Grenada
- Coat of arms of Grenada
- Commonwealth of Nations
- Commonwealth realm of Grenada
- Communications in Grenada
- Cuisine of Grenada
- Culture of Grenada

== D ==
- Demographics of Grenada
- Diplomatic missions in Grenada
- Diplomatic missions of Grenada

== E ==
- Economy of Grenada
- Education in Grenada
- Elections in Grenada
- English colonization of the Americas
- English language

== F ==
The Flag of Grenada

- Fédon's rebellion
- Flag of Grenada
- Foreign relations of Grenada
- Football in Grenada

== G ==
- Geography of Grenada
- Government of Grenada
- Grenada
- Grenada at the Olympics
- Grenada United Labour Party
- Grenadians in the United Kingdom
- Gross domestic product

== H ==
- Health in Grenada
- Hinduism in Grenada
- History of Grenada
- Brenda Hood
- Hospitals in Grenada

== I ==
- Indo-Grenadians
- International Organization for Standardization (ISO)
  - ISO 3166-1 alpha-2 country code for Grenada: GD
  - ISO 3166-1 alpha-3 country code for Grenada: GRD
  - ISO 3166-2:GD region codes for Grenada
- Internet in Grenada
- Invasion of Grenada, 1983
- Islam in Grenada
- Islands of Grenada:
  - Grenada island
  - Adam Island
  - Anthony Rock, Grenada
  - Bacolet Island
  - Bird Island, Grenada
  - Black Rock, Grenada
  - Caille Island
  - Calivigny Island
  - Carriacou
  - Conference Island
  - Diamond Island (Grenadines)
  - Fota Island, Grenada
  - Frigate Island, Grenada
  - Gary Island
  - Glover Island, Grenada
  - Green Island, Grenada
  - Hog Island
  - Hope Island, Grenada
  - Jack Adam Island
  - Kick 'em Jenny submarine volcano
  - Large Island
  - Les Tantes
  - Levera Island
  - Little Martinique
  - Little Tobago, Grenada
  - Mabouya Island
  - Marquis Island
  - Mushroom Island
  - Pearls Rock
  - Petite Dominique
  - Petite Martinique
  - Ramier Island
  - Redoda
  - Ronde Island
  - Saline Island
  - Sandy Island, Grenada
  - Soubisse Island
  - Sugar Loaf Island, Grenada
  - The Sisters, Grenada
  - White Island, Grenada

== L ==
- Languages of Grenada
- Law enforcement in Grenada
- Lesser Antilles
- LGBT rights in Grenada (Gay rights)
- Lists related to Grenada:
  - Diplomatic missions of Grenada
  - List of airports in Grenada
  - List of birds of Grenada
  - List of cities in Grenada
  - List of countries by GDP (nominal)
  - List of Grenada-related topics
  - List of Grenadian records in athletics
  - List of Grenadian records in swimming
  - List of Grenadian writers
  - List of Grenadians
  - List of hospitals in Grenada
  - List of islands of Grenada
  - List of mountains of Grenada
  - List of political parties in Grenada
  - List of rivers of Grenada
  - List of volcanoes in Grenada
  - Topic outline of Grenada

== M ==
- Military of Grenada
- Monarchy of Grenada
- Mount Saint Catherine (Grenada)
- Mountains of Grenada
- Music of Grenada

== N ==
- National Democratic Congress
- New National Party
- North America
- North Atlantic
- Northern Hemisphere

== O ==
- Organisation of Eastern Caribbean States (OECS)

== P ==
- Parishes of Grenada
- Parliament of Grenada
- Political parties in Grenada
- Politics of Grenada
- Prime Minister of Grenada
- Public holidays in Grenada
  - Independence Day (Grenada)
- Public services in Grenada

== R ==
- Rivers of Grenada

== S ==
- The Scout Association of Grenada
- Senate of Grenada
- Saint George's – Capital of Grenada
- St. George's University
- States headed by Elizabeth II

== T ==
- Topic outline of Grenada
- Transport in Grenada

== U ==
- United Nations, member state since 1974
- United States invasion of Grenada
- United States-Grenada relations

== V ==
- Volcanoes in Grenada

== W ==
- West Indies
- Western Hemisphere
- Wikimedia Atlas of Grenada
- Wikipedia:WikiProject Topic outline/Drafts/Topic outline of Grenada
- Windward Islands

== See also ==
- Commonwealth of Nations
- List of Caribbean-related topics
- List of international rankings
- Lists of country-related topics
- Topic outline of geography
- Topic outline of Grenada
- Topic outline of North America
- United Nations
