= Grenadian Creole =

Grenadian Creole may refer to the following Creole languages:

- Grenadian Creole English, the common vernacular and native language of nearly all inhabitants of Grenada
- Grenadian Creole French, or patois, a variety of Antillean Creole
