= Mount St. Catherine Forest Reserve =

Protected area in Grenada

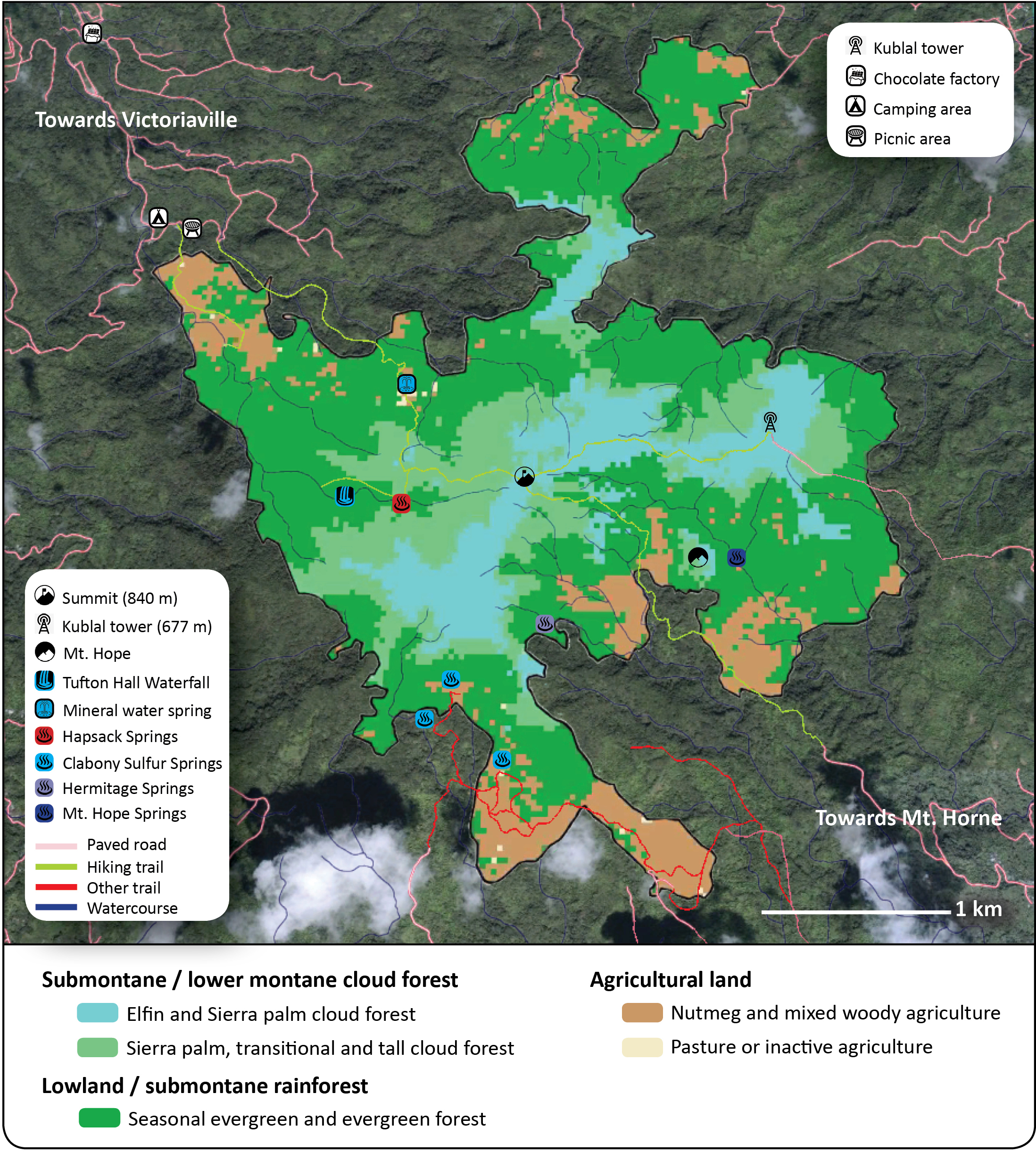
- Reserve boundaries and Land-Use Land-Cover Classification

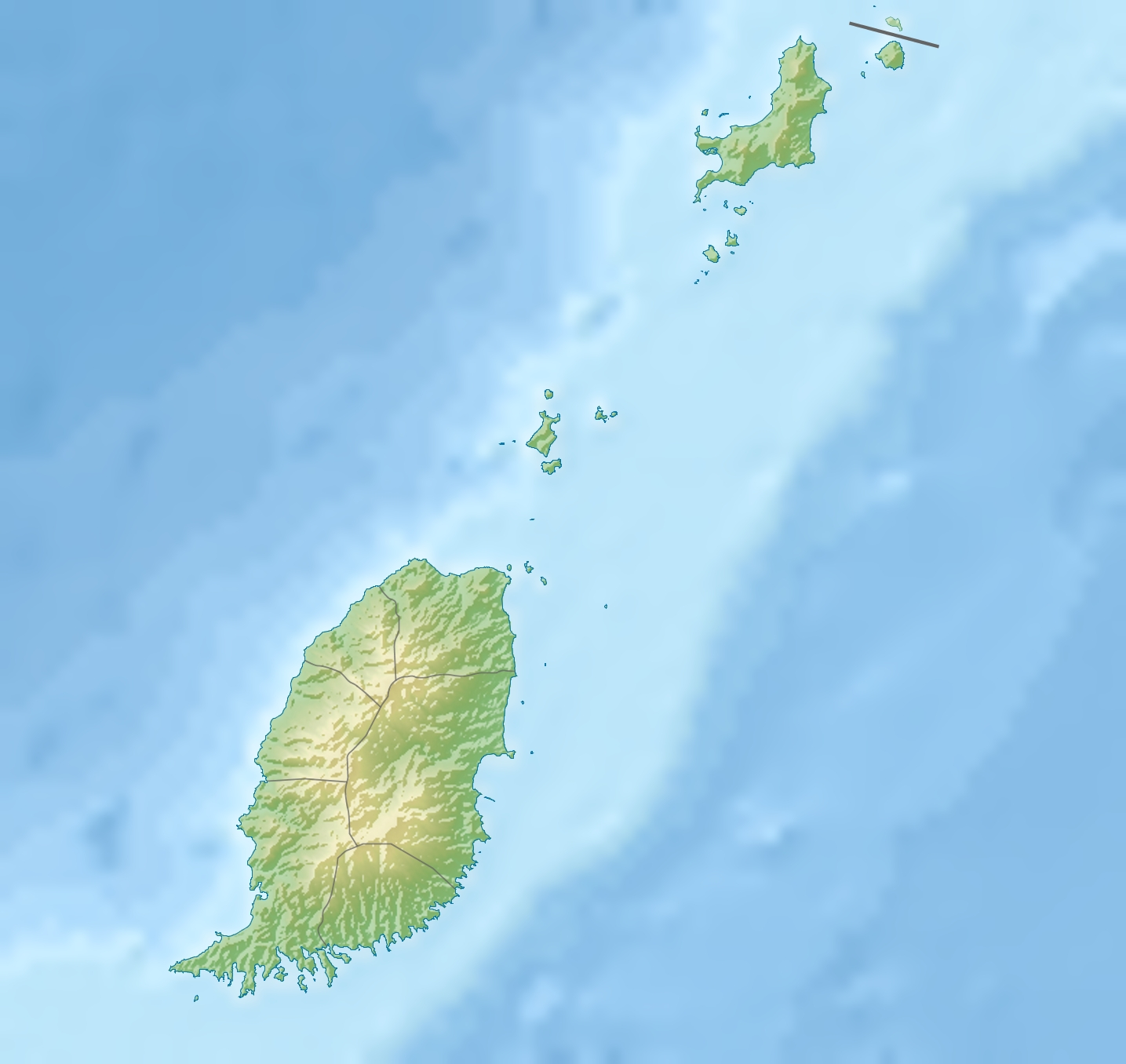
- Location within Grenada
- Nearest town: Victoria
- Coordinates: 12.162281°N 61.675035°W
- Area: 2,308 acres (9.34 km^{2})
- Max. elevation: 840 m

The Mount St. Catherine Forest Reserve is Grenada's second largest declared terrestrial protected area, after the Grand Etang and Annandale Forest Reserves. Covering 934 ha (2,310 acres) within a boundary perimeter of 31.7 km (19.7 mi), its headwaters drain across seven of the largest watersheds on the island, supplying important catchment basins for water distribution to Grenadians and agrarian landscapes downstream. The forest reserve encompasses the principal peak of the Mount Saint Catherine massif, which is the highest point on the island at 840 m (2,760 ft). It also features other lushly forested ridges and lesser peaks (e.g. Mount Hope), the highest waterfall in the country (Tufton Hall Waterfalls), the majority of the island's known hot springs, including the hottest geothermal spring (Hapsack Springs) and its most accessible geothermal bathing pool (Clabony Sulphur Springs).

== Physical environment and ecology ==
The Mt. St. Catherine massif is an extensively weathered volcano considered dormant, as it has likely not erupted since the last ice age. Among the five volcanic centers in Grenada, Mt. St. Catherine volcano is considered the only live volcano due to its relatively well-preserved morphology and the presence of hot springs and fumaroles on its flanks. The forest reserve area is typical of tropical montane cloud forests, which develop in areas where clouds impinge almost continuously on tropical mountain vegetation and differ from lowland rainforests in structure (low stature, small and tough leaves, low diversity) and function (low productivity and low nutrient-cycling rates). They are considered highly endangered ecosystems, these forest formations are rare, fragile, and are probably disappearing faster than any other forest ecosystem in the neotropics today.

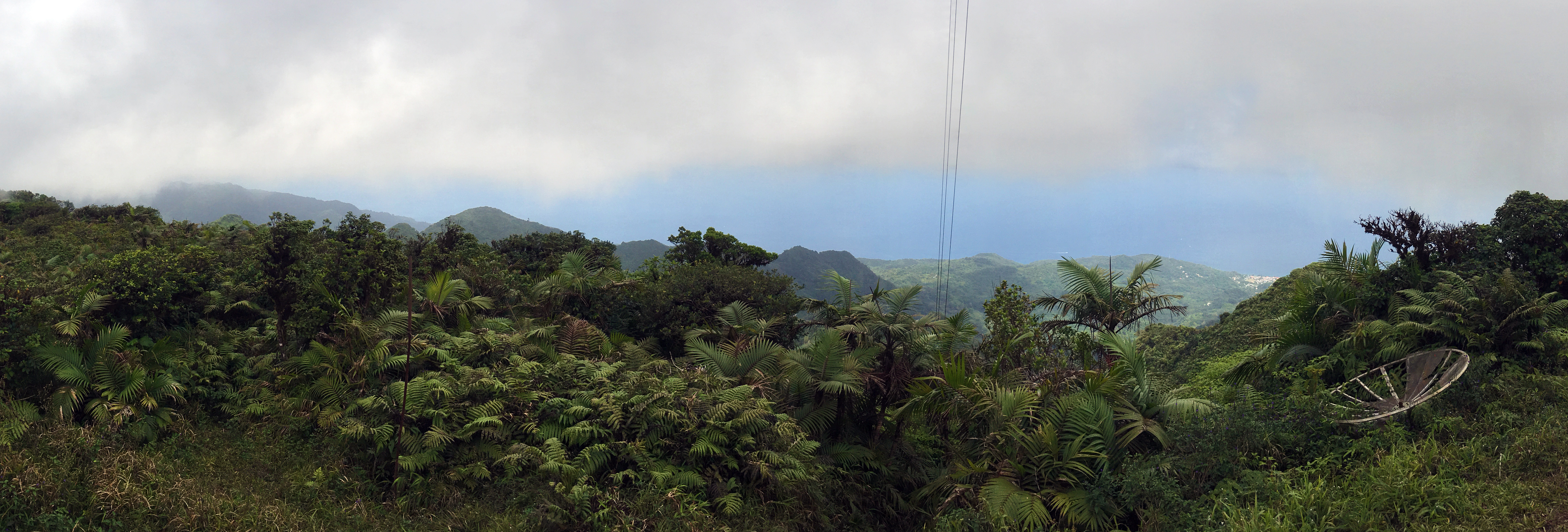
Elfin/Sierra palm cloud forest on a clear day on the Mt. St. Catherine summit (840 m). The tower cables are just above the summit exit that leads to Victoriaville, seen on the coast to the right

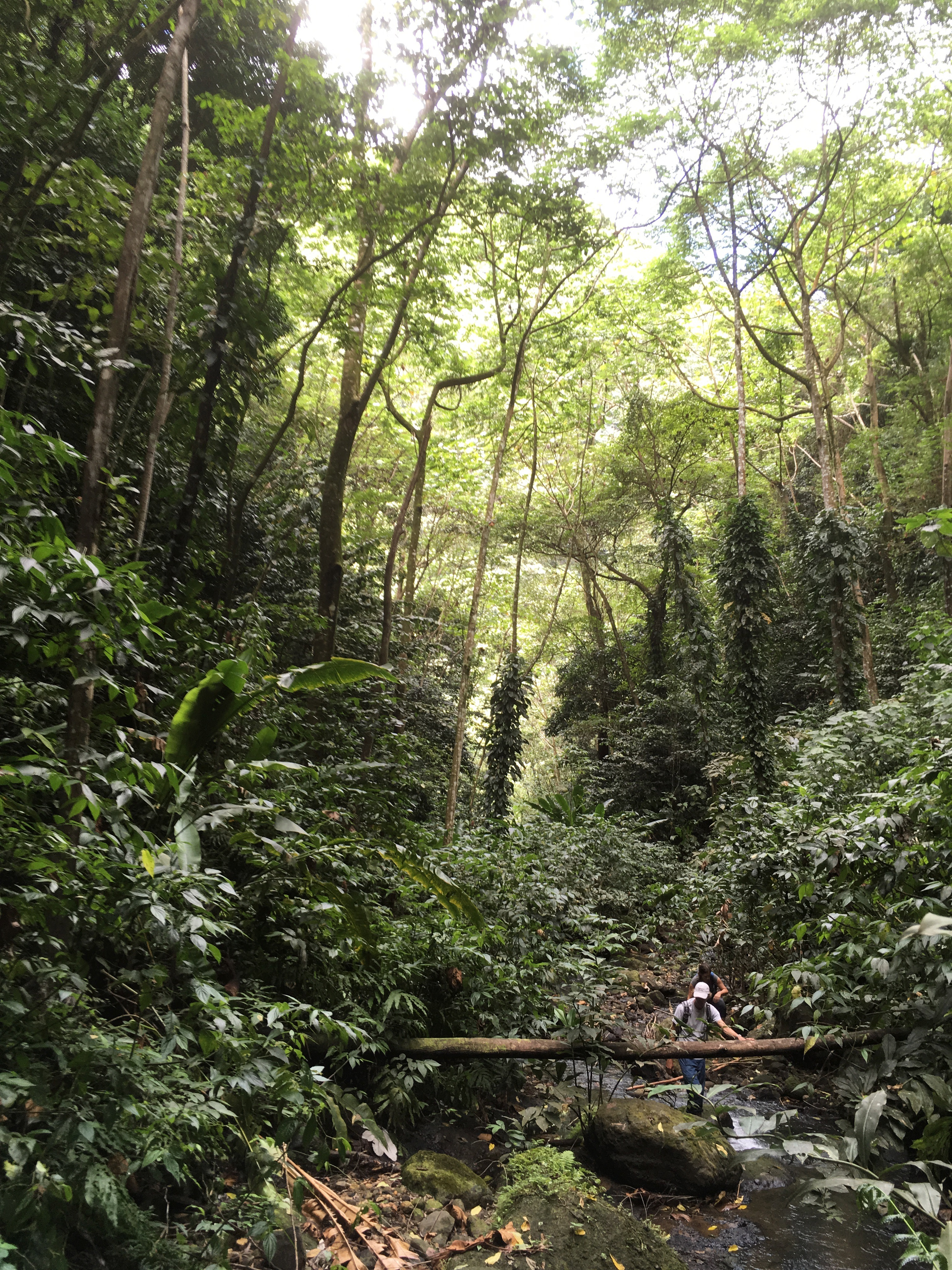
Transitional and tall cloud forest along the St. Mark's River towards Tufton Hall Waterfalls

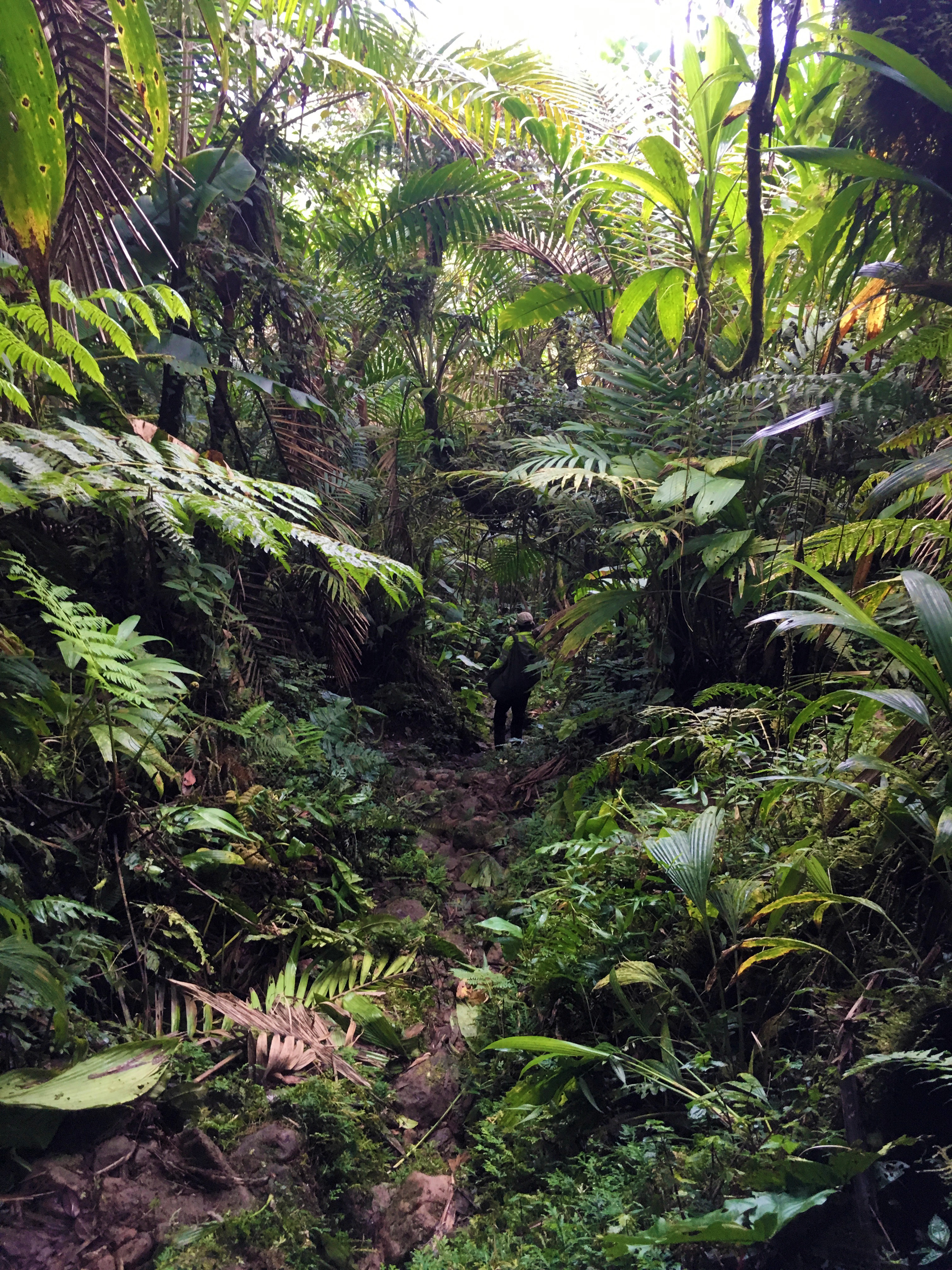
Sierra palm along the trail towards the forest reserve summit

The Mt. St. Catherine Forest Reserve is also representative of lowland rainforest and lower montane cloud forest. Its highland vegetation of dense tree growth comprising forest formations of Sierra palm, transitional and tall cloud forest, and Elfin/Sierra palm cloud forest, laden with ferns, mosses and other epiphytes and typical stunted woodland growth at higher exposed elevations. The forest is relatively mature in the sheltered lower elevations, comparable to other islands' rainforests (e.g. Grand Etang and Annandale). Additionally, Secondary forest growth from past cut-over rainforest can be seen around the lower surrounding ridges and along the reserve's periphery, where mixed-woody agriculture (particularly, agroforestry plantations of nutmeg and cacao) intersects with the forest reserve boundaries, mainly on the sides of the reserve by Victoriaville and Mt. Horne.

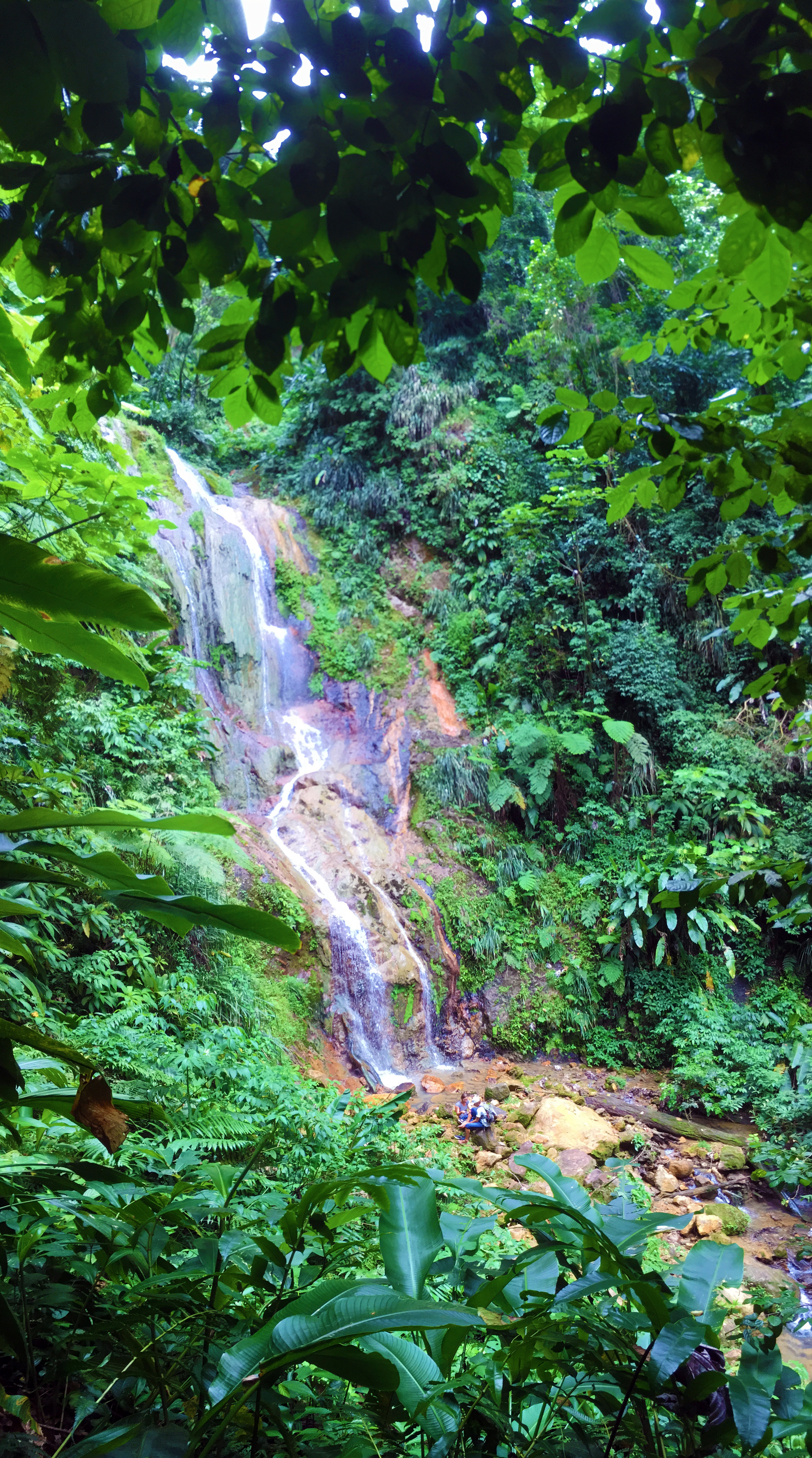
Bottom tier of Tufton Hall Waterfalls in the Mt. St. Catherine Forest Reserve

The cloud-forest ecosystem in the Mt. St. Catherine Forest Reserve serves as a valuable water resource for Grenada. Significant rainfall and cloud-mist condensate are collected within its highland forests and dispersed downslope throughout the year. It is critically important to the overall watershed regimes on the island as the main rivers and tributaries with perennial flow in Grenada are relatively small, rainfall is highly seasonal and locally limited, and only about 10% of drinking water for the population is generated through groundwater. The Mt. St. Catherine Forest Reserve, alongside other montane areas of the island, provides a range of critical watershed services, including hydrological regulation, flood control, groundwater recharge, water quality enhancement, and soil conservation.

== Hiking and trails ==
(Summit trails downloadable from Wikiloc)

Hiking in the Mt. St. Catherine Forest Reserve offers diverse experiences.

There are three steep, rugged routes to the top of the cloud forest and the Mount Saint Catherine summit, recreational strolling areas in scenic agroforestry settings, and challenging river trekking to geothermal features and waterfalls.

The trail system leads to the forest reserve and continues to an extent within limits of the reserve. It is based on old estate roads and tracks established to service crop production in the past and are generally well maintained (hiking level is easy). These may be considered more of a walk on gentle hills along a hard packed trail over a short distance (1 h or less).

The main trails from the foot of the mountain towards the summit vary in their difficulty levels (moderate to difficult, 3+ hours). The moderate sections of these main trails cover steep terrain with much elevation gain, at times over rocky and muddy parts, but are generally well worn and free of encumbering vegetation. The difficult sections of these main trails may be technically challenging (e.g. requiring the use of hands) with considerable elevation gain, often over steep rocky and muddy terrain, and would not be completed unless one is in good physical condition. Secondary trails off these main trails (only used in hunting) require bushwhacking and route-finding skills to navigate.
