= Windward Caribbean Creole English =

Windward Caribbean Creole English may refer to:

- Vincentian Creole
- Grenadian Creole
