= Hail Grenada =

National anthem of Grenada

- National anthem of Grenada
- Lyrics: Irva Merle Baptiste-Blackett
- Music: Louis Arnold Masanto
- Adopted: 1974

Audio sample
- Instrumental version: file; help

"Hail Grenada" has been the national anthem of Grenada since independence from the United Kingdom in 1974. The words are by Irva Merle Baptiste-Blackett MBE (1924–2020), and the music is by Louis Arnold Masanto (born 1938). It formally replaced the Grenada National State Anthem, written and adopted in 1967.

== History ==
The anthem was written by schoolteacher Irva Merle Baptiste-Blackett. Also a music teacher, Baptiste-Blackett took part in the Independence Anthem Songwriting Competition in the early 1970s, with her submission being selected as the national anthem. During the 2009 Independence Celebrations, Baptiste-Blackett received Grenada's Camerhogne Silver Award for her writing of the national anthem.

== Lyrics ==
English lyrics

Hail! Grenada, land of ours,
We pledge ourselves to thee,
Heads, hearts and hands in unity
To reach our destiny.
Ever conscious of God,
Being proud of our heritage,
May we with faith and courage
Aspire, build, advance
As one people, one family.
God bless our nation.

Grenadian Creole French lyrics

Hélé la Gwinad te annou
Nou pléjé ko an nou pou ou
Tet, tje e lanmen an younité
Pou wivé déstinasyon nou
Toujou konésas an Djé
Pwéjé Héwitaj an Nou
Sé pou nou an lafwa eve kouwaj
Anspiwé, bati, avansé
Kon yonn sel moun, yonn sel fanmi
Djé benni nasyon annou
