= National symbols of Grenada =

The national symbols of Grenada are the symbols that are used in Grenada and abroad to represent the country and its people. Prominent examples include Grenada's coat of arms as a Grenadian symbol and its penny.

== List of symbols ==
Symbol	image	Started on
Royal Anthem	God Save the King	
Royal Cypher		
Patriotic Symbols	Nutmeg	
National flag		
Coat of arms		
National anthem	Hail Grenada	
Motto	Ever Conscious of God We Aspire, Build and Advance as One People	
National colours	Red #B90600 yellow #FFFF00 green #00FF00	
National dish	Oil down	
Floral emblem	Bougainvillea	
National Bird	Grenada dove	
