= Grand Etang and Annandale Forest Reserves =

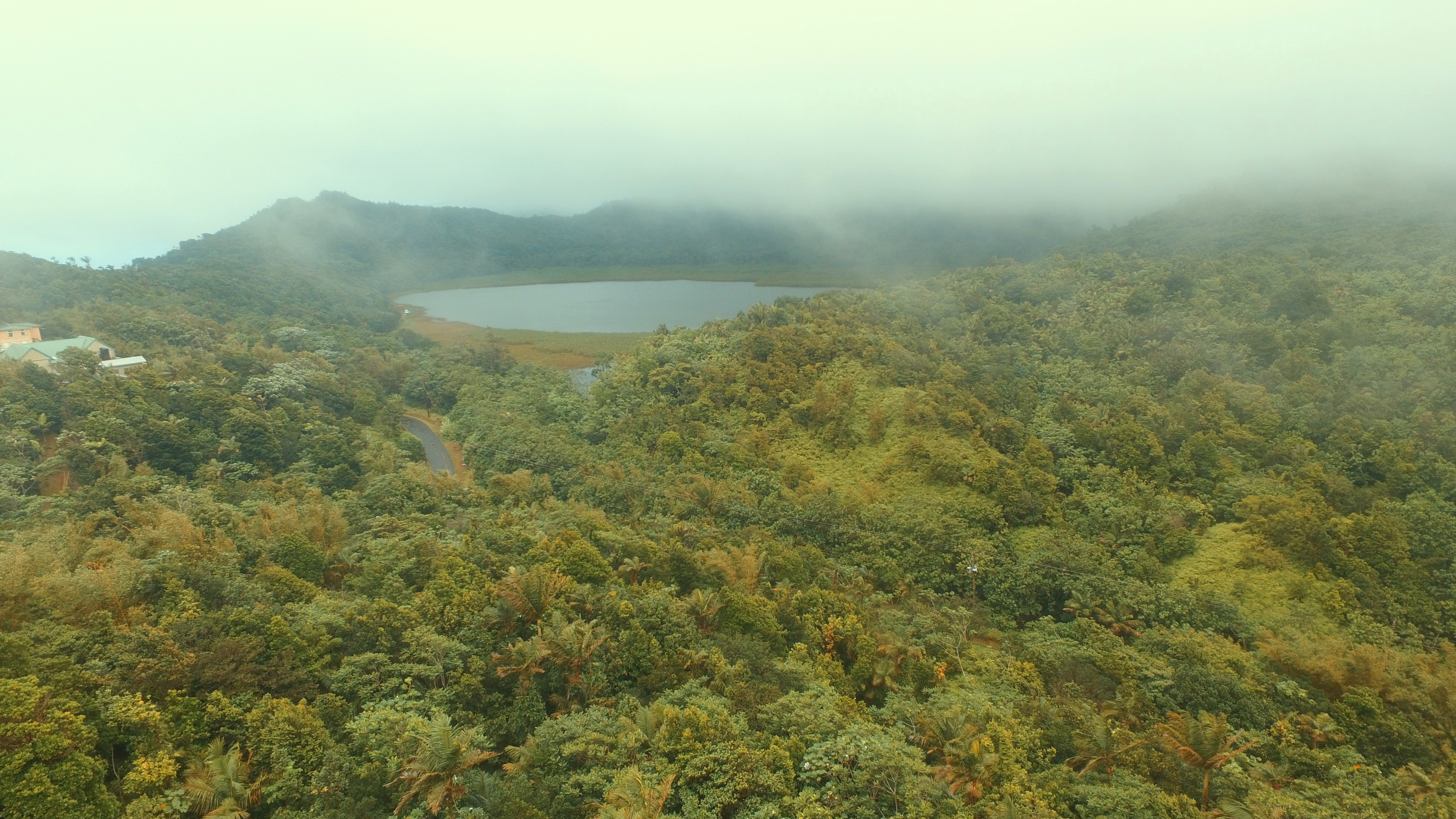
Grand Etang Lake

The Grand Etang and Annandale Forest Reserves are contiguous protected areas located in the south central interior mountains of Grenada. Together they encompass the largest declared terrestrial protected area in Grenada followed by the Mount St. Catherine Forest Reserve. The Grand Etang and Annandale Forest Reserves are managed together.
