= Health in Grenada =

Health analysis and report

Grenada had one of the best health care systems in the Caribbean in 2000 according to a report by the World Health Organization. In 2014, life expectancy at birth was 74.1 years. In 1983 the infant mortality rate of 21.2 per 1,000 live births, rather better than other Eastern Caribbean islands.

== Healthcare ==
The Ministry of Health is responsible for the provision of health services in Grenada, Carriacou and Petit Martinique. Nickolas Steele is the minister of health. There is a lot of emphasis on primary health care and preventative measures. Grenada does not have a national health insurance scheme at present but there is a compulsory National Insurance Scheme, which covers work-related injuries.

Public spending on health was 3% of GDP in 2011, equivalent to US$479 per capita. In 2009, there were 98 doctors, and 398 nurses and midwives per 100,000 people. Primary health care services are generally free other than the cost of medicines, lab-work, or other diagnostics.

The SpiceIsle Imaging Center is a private business, established in 2004, which provides scanning, mammography and ultrasound services.

The New National Party (Grenada) proposed to introduce a National Health Insurance scheme in 2017. It would give citizens a card which would entitle them to use the services of SpiceIsle Imaging Center. Keith Mitchell promised in 2018 before the general election that implementation of the scheme would be a high priority. Technical support had been arranged by the University of the West Indies.

Most pharmaceuticals are sourced through the Eastern Caribbean Drug Service.

== Facilities ==
There are thirty medical stations, six health centers, and eight hospitals (four public and four private). Every household has a healthcare provider within three miles. The General Hospital in St. George’s is the premier facility. The closest and only mental health facility is at Mt. Gay Hospital in St. George's, Grenada. Tertiary care is often only available off the island at private expense.

== See also ==
- List of hospitals in Grenada
