= Demographics of Grenada =

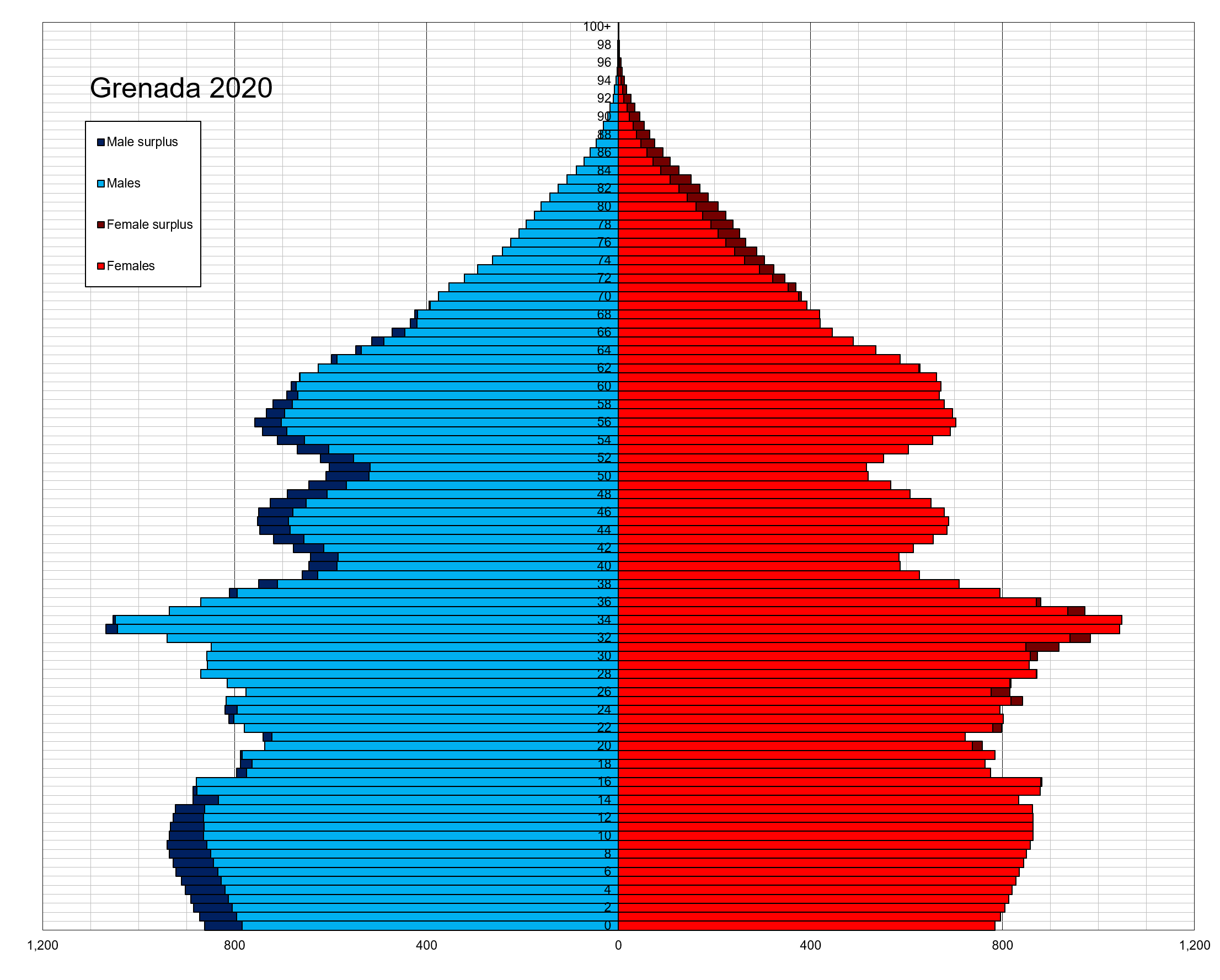
- Population pyramid of Grenada in 2020
- Population: 113,949 (2022 est.)
- Growth rate: 0.32% (2022 est.)
- Birth rate: 13.94 births/1,000 population (2022 est.)
- Death rate: 8.31 deaths/1,000 population (2022 est.)
- Life expectancy: 75.74 years
  - male: 73.13 years
  - female: 78.6 years
- Fertility rate: 1.93 children born/woman (2022 est.)
- Infant mortality: 9.4 deaths/1,000 live births
- Net migration rate: -2.43 migrant(s)/1,000 population (2022 est.)

Age structure
- 0–14 years: 23.23%
- 65 and over: 10.89%

Sex ratio
- Total: 1.03 male(s)/female (2022 est.)
- At birth: 1.1 male(s)/female
- Under 15: 1.09 male(s)/female
- 65 and over: 0.69 male(s)/female

Nationality
- Nationality: Grenadian
- Major ethnic: African descent (82.4%)

The demography of the people of Grenada, Grenadians /ɡrəˈneɪdiːənz/, includes population density, ethnicity, education level, health of the populace, economic status, religious affiliations and other aspects of the population.

Census population and average annual growth rate
Year	Pop.	±% p.a.
1871	37,684	—
1881	42,403	+1.19%
1891	53,209	+2.30%
1901	63,438	+1.77%
1911	66,750	+0.51%
1921	66,302	−0.07%
1946	72,387	+0.35%
1960	88,677	+1.46%
1970	92,775	+0.45%
1981	89,088	−0.37%
1991	85,123	−0.45%
2001	103,137	+1.94%
2011	105,539	+0.23%

== Population ==
According to the 2011 census Grenada has 105,539 inhabitants. The estimated population of 2021 is 124,610 (the 2022 revision of the World Population Prospects).

=== Structure of the population ===
Population Estimates by Sex and Age Group (01.VII.2017):

Age group	Male	Female	Total	%
Total	56 222	55 245	111 467	100
0–4	4 282	3 872	8 154	7.32
5–9	3 793	3 634	7 427	6.66
10–14	4 392	4 276	8 668	7.78
15–19	4 869	4 818	9 687	8.69
20–24	5 027	4 797	9 824	8.81
25–29	4 758	4 722	9 480	8.50
30–34	3 596	3 514	7 110	6.38
35–39	3 424	3 130	6 554	5.88
40–44	3 120	2 904	6 024	5.40
45–49	3 416	3 198	6 614	5.93
50–54	3 179	3 195	6 374	5.72
55–59	2 455	2 231	4 686	4.20
60–64	1 806	1 765	3 571	3.20
65–69	1 261	1 497	2 758	2.47
70–74	1 106	1 287	2 393	2.15
75–79	732	999	1 731	1.55
80–84	417	695	1 112	1.00
85–89	168	359	527	0.47
90+	78	197	275	0.25
Age group	Male	Female	Total	Percent
0–14	12 467	11 782	24 249	21.75
15–64	39 993	38 429	78 422	70.35
65+	3 762	5 034	8 796	7.89

== Vital statistics ==
	Average population	Live births	Deaths	Natural change	Crude birth rate (per 1000)	Crude death rate (per 1000)	Natural change (per 1000)	Total fertility rate	Infant mortality rate
1950	77,000	2,962	1,056	1,906	38.6	13.8	24.9		
1951	77,000	3,037	1,276	1,761	39.6	16.7	23.0		
1952	77,000	3,119	1,255	1,864	40.4	16.3	24.2		
1953	78,000	3,283	1,084	2,199	42.0	13.9	28.2		
1954	79,000	3,507	793	2,714	44.2	10.0	34.2		
1955	81,000	3,919	1,205	2,714	48.4	14.9	33.5		
1956	83,000	3,627	1,179	2,448	43.8	14.2	29.6		
1957	85,000	4,664	908	3,756	55.1	10.7	44.4		
1958	86,000	4,253	973	3,280	49.2	11.2	37.9		
1959	88,000	4,115	919	3,196	46.6	10.4	36.2		
1960	90,000	4,016	1,032	2,984	44.7	11.5	33.2		
1961	91,000	3,691	1,022	2,669	40.4	11.2	29.2		
1962	92,000	3,419	840	2,579	37.0	9.1	27.9		
1963	93,000	3,445	827	2,618	36.9	8.9	28.0		
1964	94,000	3,374	804	2,570	35.9	8.5	27.3		
1965	95,000	2,968	822	2,146	31.4	8.7	22.7		
1966	95,000	2,820	852	1,968	29.7	9.0	20.7		
1967	95,000	2,816	786	2,030	29.7	8.3	21.4		
1968	95,000	2,994	822	2,172	31.6	8.7	22.9		
1969	95,000	2,757	768	1,989	29.1	8.1	21.0		
1970	94,000	2,741	743	1,998	29.0	7.9	21.2		
1971	94,000	2,879	739	2,140	30.6	7.8	22.7		
1972	94,000	2,939	660	2,279	31.3	7.0	24.3		
1973	94,000	2,933	726	2,207	31.3	7.8	23.6		
1974	93,000	2,734	734	2,000	29.4	7.9	21.5		
1975	92,000	2,890	619	2,271	31.3	6.7	24.6		
1976	91,000	2,712	678	2,034	29.7	7.4	22.2		
1977	90,000	2,628	806	1,822	29.1	8.9	20.2		
1978	89,000	2,521	765	1,756	28.3	8.6	19.7		
1979	89,000	2,664	739	1,925	30.1	8.3	21.7		
1993	97,056	2,220	745	1,475	22.6	7.6	15.0		
1994	97,793	2,254	777	1,477	22.7	7.8	14.9		
1995	98,540	2,286	807	1,479	22.8	8.0	14.8		12.7
1996	98,921	2,096	782	1,314	20.8	7.8	13.0		14.3
1997	99,516	2,191	707	1,484	21.7	7.0	14.7		14.1
1998	100,100	1,938	819	1,119	19.1	8.1	11.0		19.1
1999	100,703	1,791	794	997	17.7	7.8	9.8		15.2
2000	101,308	1,883	765	1,118	18.5	7.5	11.0		14.3
2001	103,143	1,899	727	1,172	18.6	7.1	11.5		17.4
2002	104,068	1,756	887	869	16.9	8.5	8.4		20.5
2003	104,769	1,851	810	1,041	17.7	7.7	10.0		11.9
2004	104,712	1,868	884	984	17.8	8.4	9.4		9.6
2005	104,441	1,804	834	970	17.3	8.0	9.3	2.2	9.4
2006	104,708	1,663	765	898	15.9	7.3	8.6	1.9	12.6
2007	104,981	1,825	740	1,085	17.4	7.0	10.4	2.2	7.1
2008	105,298	1,809	842	967	17.2	8.0	9.2	2.1	5.0
2009	105,175	1,800	781	1,019	17.1	7.4	9.7	2.0	7.8
2010	105,038	1,709	831	878	16.3	7.9	8.4	1.9	12.3
2011	106,667	1,812	795	1,017	17.0	7.5	9.5	2.177	15.5
2012	107,599	1,661	857	804	15.4	8.0	7.5	1.924	13.2
2013	108,580	1,838	822	1,016	16.9	7.6	9.4	2.129	17.4
2014	109,374	1,750	958	792	16.0	8.8	7.2	2.003	18.9
2015	110,096	1,694	869	825	15.4	7.9	7.5	1.925	16.5
2016	110,910	1,577	898	679	14.2	8.1	6.1	1.788	15.9
2017	111,467	1,398	885	513	12.5	7.9	4.6	1.705	24.3
2018	111,959	1,520	965	555	13.6	8.6	5.0	1.693	15.8
2019	112,579	1,575	981	594	14.0	8.7	5.3		11.4
2020	113,135	1,540	1,033	507	13.5	8.9	4.6		20.1
2021	113,703	1,611	1,273	338	14.2	11.2	3.0		18.6
2022		1,469	1,136	333					19.7
2023		1,380	1,068	312					12.3
2024		1,115							

=== Fertility rate ===
The fertility rate in Grenada was 2.21 in 2013.

== Ethnic groups ==
The vast majority of the population of Grenada are of African descent (89.4% at the 2001 census). There is also a significant mixed population (8.2%), along with a small European origin minority (0.4%), East Indians (1.6%), and there are small numbers of Lebanese/Syrians (0.04%) and Chinese (0.02%).

=== Amerindians ===
Grenada has a small population of pre-Columbian native Caribs. According to the 2001 census there are only 125 Caribs remaining (0.12% of the total population).

== Languages ==
Apart from a 114-year period of French occupancy (1649–1763) English has been the country's official language. However, over time the population has come to use a colloquial English-based creole language called Grenadian Creole English, which is said to reflect the African, European and Indian heritage of the nation.

Grenadian Creole English was originally influenced by French, and now contains elements from Grenadian Creole French and a little of the African languages. Grenadian Creole French is mainly spoken in smaller rural areas, and today it can only be heard in a few small pockets of the society. Grenadian Creole French is mainly known as Patois and may have similarities to the Saint Lucian Creole French.

It is believed that the one-time native or indigenous languages were Iñeri and Karina.

== Religion ==
Historically the religious makeup of the islands of Grenada covers the period from first European occupation in the 17th century. This has always been predominantly Christian and largely Roman Catholic (due to the first occupants being French) and from the 1891 census we get a snapshot of the population and its religious proclivities - over half were Roman Catholic (55%), a third were Church of England (36%), others listed were Wesleyan (6%) and Presbyterian (0.88%).

More recently, according to the government's 2011 information, 85.2% percent of the population of Grenada is considered Christian, 7.7% is non-Christian and 7% has no religious belief. Roughly one third of Christians are Roman Catholics (36% of the total population), a reflection of early French influence on the island, and one half are Protestant (49.2%).

Anglicanism constitutes the largest Protestant group, with about 11.5% of the population. Pentecostals are the second largest group (about 11.3%), followed by Seventh-day Adventists (approximately 10.5% of the population). Other estimates include Baptists (2.9%), Church of God (2.6%), Methodists (1.8%), Evangelicals (1.6%) Jehovah's Witnesses (1.1%), and Brethren Christian (0.5%).

The number of non-Christians is small. These religious groups include the Rastafarian Movement (1.1% of the population), Hinduism (0.2%) and Muslims (0.3%).
