= Grenada National State Anthem =

1967–1974 national anthem of Grenada

- Former national anthem of Grenada
- Lyrics: Rolstan Percival Jawahir Adams
- Music: Dr. John George Fletcher
- Adopted: 3 March 1967
- Relinquished: 7 February 1974

Audio sample
- Digital Recreation: file; help

The Grenada National State Anthem was the national anthem of Grenada from 1967 until independence in 1974, during the period that Grenada was an associated state of Great Britain under the West Indies Act 1967. The words are by Rolstan Percival Jawahir Adams (1946–2008) and the music is by Dr. John George Fletcher (1931–2015).

== Background ==
After the Federation of the West Indies collapsed in 1962, the British government tried to form a small federation out of its remaining dependencies in the Eastern Caribbean. Following the failure of this second effort, the British and the Caribbean islanders developed the concept of "associated statehood". Under the West Indies Act on 3 March 1967 Grenada was granted full autonomy over its internal affairs and therefore was entitled to create a new Flag and National Anthem. The first Premier of the Associated State of Grenada from March to August 1967 was Herbert Blaize.

== English lyrics ==
Hope of our future,
Land of ours today,
Land of our fathers
Now ‘neath our bounded sway,
may thy glory toil and tears
Anthem through the marching years.

May our faith and courage,
love of liberty,
lift us on the surges
Of our destiny,
let the strength of unity,
lead us to prosperity.

May we in our striving make God our guiding light,
Brighter out of darkness dawn that follows night,
Sons and Daughters,
Hand in hand,
striving for a better land.
