= Geology of Grenada =

The geology of Grenada is part of the broader Volcanic Caribbees in the Lesser Antilles volcanic island arc. Rocks spanning much of the Cenozoic are exposed in the Grenadines Bank—a northeast-southwest trending shallow bank. Grenadite is common, especially in lower regions. Alkaline, magnesium rich basaltic rocks are common from the Pliocene through the Quaternary and form part of the active Kick'em Jenny volcano north of the island. The oldest rocks date to the Middle Eocene and include basalts overlain by turbidite deposits. During the Oligocene and Miocene, these rocks were folded and faulted.
