= Freedom of religion in North America by country =

The status of religious freedom in North America varies from country to country. States can differ based on whether or not they guarantee equal treatment under law for followers of different religions, whether they establish a state religion (and the legal implications that this has for both practitioners and non-practitioners), the extent to which religious organizations operating within the country are policed, and the extent to which religious law is used as a basis for the country's legal code.

There are further discrepancies between some countries' self-proclaimed stances of religious freedom in law and the actual practice of authority bodies within those countries: a country's establishment of religious equality in their constitution or laws does not necessarily translate into freedom of practice for residents of the country. Additionally, similar practices (such as having religious organizations register with the government) can have different consequences depending on other sociopolitical circumstances specific to the countries in question.

Every country in North America includes provisions for the freedom of religion or freedom of conscience in its constitution. Several countries also have formally outlawed discrimination on religious grounds, and according to US State Department reports many countries in the region have no outstanding issues regarding breaches of religious freedom due to government intervention or societal pressure. Seven countries have blasphemy laws which have been part of their legal codes since the British colonial era, but which are not currently enforced. Rastafarians face discrimination and obstacles to religious practice in many countries in the region, often due in part to countries outlawing cannabis, which is used in Rastafarian religious rituals. Roman Catholicism is the state religion of a few countries in North America, and a couple more provide preferential treatment to the Catholic Church despite not officially establishing it as a state religion.

== Antigua and Barbuda ==
The constitution of Antigua and Barbuda establishes the freedom of religious belief in the country. Members of clergy are not allowed to run for political office.

The law decriminalizing marijuana for any use has eased relationships with the Rastafari community, although in 2022 there were still issues regarding children with traditional Rastafari hairstyles attending some schools.

The law prohibits religious instruction in public schools; private schools are allowed to provide this and parents can also homeschool their children.

== The Bahamas ==
The constitution of the Bahamas provides for the freedom of religion and prohibits discrimination based on belief. The country has no state religion, although the preamble to its constitution mentions "Christian values".

Obeah is illegal in the Bahamas, punishable by a jail sentence. This law, however, is traditionally unenforced. Similarly, laws prohibiting the publication of blasphemy (with exceptions for opinions "expressed in good faith and in decent language") are also unenforced.

Religious education is available in schools and focusses mainly on Christianity; in 2022 there were issues regarding children with traditional Rastafari hairstyles attending some schools.

The government is looking at legislation in regards to Rastafarians and traditional drug use.

== Barbados ==
The constitution of Barbados provides for the freedom of religion and prohibits discrimination based on creed; there is a law against "blasphemous libel" but it is unenforced.

Religious groups are allowed to establish private schools and provide religious instruction, with some support from the government; education in Christian values is taught in primary schools, with several religions being taught at secondary level (students may opt out).

Representatives of the Rastafari community have objected to mandatory vaccinations for schoolchildren.

== Belize ==
The Constitution of Belize establishes the freedom of religion. Discrimination on religious grounds is illegal. A law against blasphemy is unenforced. The Belize Council of Churches and the Belize Association of Evangelical Churches appoint one senator to the senate of Belize with the approval of the Governor-General. The law also establishes that prisoners in jails must have their religious beliefs respected and accommodated.

Religious groups are required to register with the government in order to operate in the country. Religious groups are exempt from certain taxes. Foreign religious workers are required to purchase a religious worker's permit and register with the government.

The public school curriculum for primary schools includes non-denominational "spirituality" classes that introduce world religions, as well as ethics and morals associated with religion; in 2022 there were issues regarding children with traditional Rastafari hairstyles attending some schools. Most public schools are managed by Christian churches. A few schools are run by non-Christian religious groups.

== Canada ==
Religious freedom in Canada is a constitutionally protected right as part of Section 2 of the Canadian Charter of Rights and Freedoms, allowing believers the freedom to assemble and worship without limitation or interference.

The Canadian Charter of Rights and Freedoms, which is entrenched in the Constitution, states in the preamble that Canada "is founded upon principles that recognize the supremacy of God and the rule of law." Freedom of religion as also guaranteed. The Supreme Court of Canada, in the case of Her Majesty The Queen in Right of Canada v. Big M Drug Mart Ltd., [1985] (1 S.C.R. 295) ruled that a 1906 statute that required most places to be closed on Sunday did not have a legitimate purpose in a "free and democratic society," and was an unconstitutional attempt to establish a religious-based closing law (see Blue law.)

There is no established church, however religious groups can qualify for tax-exemption. Religious schools are run throughout the country; Catholic and Protestant schools in Ontario, Alberta, and Saskatchewan have the right to public funding.

In 2022, Pope Francis traveled to Canada and gave an apology to the Indigenous peoples for "the evil" committed in former residential schools.

== Costa Rica ==
The constitution of Costa Rica establishes Roman Catholicism as the state religion and provides it with special privileges and funding. The constitution also prohibits the government from interfering with the free practice of religion.

Religious groups with at least ten members may register with the government in order to be able to raise funds and own property. There is no penalty for not being registered, other than a lack of access to these privileges.

Religious marriage ceremonies other than those conducted by the Catholic Church are not recognized by the government. Couples married through such ceremonies must also obtain a civil union in order to have their marriage legally recognized.

All public schools must provide general Christian religious instruction for all students, in a respectful way which promotes moral values and tolerance.

== Cuba ==
The constitution of Cuba establishes the freedom of religion and prohibits religious discrimination. However, penal codes are enforced against anyone who is a member of an unregistered group or anyone who attempts to conscientiously object to military service, with fines and prison terms as punishment.

Following the Cuban Revolution, in the 1960s Cuba's government polemicized against the Catholic Church, which was accused of being Francoist and anti-communist, and priests were imprisoned and harassed by the government. Additionally, the Communist Party of Cuba did not allow non-atheists to become party members. Since the 1980s, the government of Cuba has taken an increasingly permissive stance towards religious practice, first thawing relations with Protestant groups which were encouraged to practice their religion, and then later inviting Pope John Paul II in the 90s to visit the country (all subsequent popes have made official visits to Cuba since then). The government, however, continues to restrict the Catholic Church's communications and only allows it to receive funding from sources that it approves.

Homeschooling is illegal in Cuba.

In 2022, Freedom House rated Cuba's religious freedom as 3 out of 4. The Cuban Observatory for Human Rights noted that in 2022, 67% of people knew someone who had faced harassment due to their religious faith.

A 2023 report by Christian Solidarity Worldwide found that documented freedom of religion violations more than doubled from 272 in 2021 to 657 in 2022. Violations included harassment, arbitrary detention, restrictions on movement and travel, prevention from attending religious services, confiscation of goods and property and attacks on social media.

== Dominica ==
The constitution of Dominica provides for the freedom of religion and thought.

The government subsidizes the salaries of teachers at private religious schools; public schools typically include optional non-denominational prayers in morning assemblies.

Rastafarian hairstyles are officially banned in schools and jails, but this is not enforced; possession of less than one ounce of marijuana is legal and Rastafarians have noted authorities did not enforce marijuana laws when the community used it in its religious rites.

Religious groups may register with the government in order to receive non-profit status, hold a worship service or carry out a wedding.

== Dominican Republic ==
The constitution of the Dominican Republic provides for the freedom of religion. Catholicism is the state religion and the Catholic Church receives special privileges, such as subsidies for clergy salaries and the transfer of property to the Church.

Non-Catholic religious groups can register with the government in order to receive custom duties exemptions and to be allowed to officiate marriages.

Public schools include religious studies classes with either Catholic or evangelical Protestant curricula. Parents can choose to have their children skip such classes, and private schools are not required to provide them. Private religious schools may offer their own religious curricula.

== El Salvador ==
The constitution of El Salvador provides for the freedom of religion and prohibits religious discrimination. Publicly offending others' religious beliefs or damaging religious objects is punishable by imprisonment. Members of the clergy may not hold senior government positions, and are forbidden from joining political parties.

Religious groups may register with the government for the purposes of tax-exemption and acquiring building permits. Special visas are required for individuals who wish to travel to El Salvador to engage in proselytizing.

Public school education is secular; private schools may include religious content in their curricula, but do not receive government support. Since 2016, clergy have limited access to prisons, due to concerns that some members of the clergy were using prison visits to smuggle items into prisons; during Covid, all visits were banned and in 2022, these had not been resumed.

== Grenada ==
The constitution of Grenada establishes the freedom of religion. The country's legal code bans the publication of blasphemy, but this is not enforced in practice.

Religious groups may register in order to receive tax exemption and to sponsor missionaries from outside the country.

The government subsidizes religiously affiliated private schools, all of which are linked to Christian denominations.

In 2022, Grenada was scored 4 out of 4 for religious freedom.

== Guatemala ==
The constitution of Guatemala establishes the freedom of religion. While it is not a state religion, the Catholic Church is recognized as "a distinct legal personality" that receives certain privileges.

According to the constitution, no member of the clergy of any religion may serve as president, vice president, government minister, or as a judge.

Registration for religious groups is not required, but provides access to property purchase and tax exemptions; registration can take up to two years.

The constitution includes a commitment to protect the rights of indigenous Maya groups to practice their religion. Mayan religious groups are allowed to use historical sites on government-owned property for ceremonies. However, representatives of Mayan groups have complained that their access is limited and subject to other obstacles, such as being required to pay fees.

Public schools may choose to offer religious instruction, but there is no national framework for such classes. Private religious schools are allowed to operate.

== Haiti ==
The constitution of Haiti establishes the freedom of religion. The Ministry of Foreign Affairs oversees and monitors religious groups and laws affecting them. While Catholicism has not been the state religion since 1987, a 19th century concordat with the Holy See continues to confer preferential treatment to the Catholic Church, in the form of stipends for clergy and financial support to churches and religious schools. The Catholic Church also retains the right to appoint certain amounts of clergy in Haiti without the government's consent.

Religious groups are not required to register with the government, but may do so in order to receive special standing in legal proceedings, tax exemptions, and civil recognition for marriage and baptismal certificates. The Ministry of Foreign Affairs has continually not approved a request from the Muslim community to register as a religious group, which has been outstanding since the 1980s. According to the government, this was due to not having received necessary financial documentation as part of the registration process. In the past, the government did not recognize marriages performed by Haitian Vodou practitioners, despite it being a registered religion; government officials claim that they are working with the Vodou community to establish a certification process for their clergy in order to resolve this issue. Representatives of the Vodou community have reported social stigma against their communities, and discrimination in employment.

In the past, Muslims in jail did not reliably have access to halal food and Muslim clergy due to a lack of resources.

== Honduras ==
The constitution of Honduras establishes the freedom of religion. however, the constitution prohibits religious leaders from holding elected office or publicly making political statements.

Public schools are required to teach secular curricula. Private religious schools are also operated by several Christian denominations.

Foreign missionaries must register with the government; some religious groups have reached agreements with the government to expedite this process.

Clergy are provided exemptions from being required to testify in court about information acquired from religious confessions. Vicars, bishops, and archbishops of the Catholic Church, as well as similarly high ranking members of other religions, are not required to appear in court if subpoenaed, although they must make a statement at another location.

The National Congress of Honduras has the power to legally recognize religious groups, which confers to them tax-exempt status and other privileges. In the past, the Catholic Church was the only organization legally recognized as a religious group, although other religious groups can register with the government as NGOs; some religious groups have criticized this as constituting preferential treatment for the Catholic Church at the expense of other groups.

In the past, conscientious objection to military service has been protected by law, including objection on religious grounds.

In the past, some opposition politicians have regularly used antisemitism rhetoric in their political statements.

Some Protestant pastors have been elected to government positions and serve on government advisory bodies. The government has also included Catholic or Protestant prayers as part of official events and ceremonies, which has been criticized by representatives of other religious groups.

== Jamaica ==
The constitution of Jamaica establishes the freedom of religion and outlaws religious discrimination. A colonial-era law criminalizing Obeah and Myal continues to exist, but has rarely been enforced since Jamaica's independence from the United Kingdom in 1962.

Registration with the government is not mandatory for religious groups, but provides groups with some privileges, such as being able to own land and enter legal disputes as an organization. Groups seeking tax-exempt status must register separately as charities.

The public school curriculum includes non-denominational religious education. Some public schools are run by religious institutions, but are required to hold to the same standard as other public schools. Religious private schools also operate in Jamaica.

Representatives of the Christian, Jewish, and Muslim communities in Jamaica have described Jamaican society as being tolerant of religious diversity, and identified the high level of interfaith dialogue as evidence to support this claim.

While Rastafarians were once persecuted by the government of Jamaica and routinely harassed by police looking for then-illegal cannabis, the government has since taken steps to accommodate Rastafarians, including the decriminalization of the possession of small amounts of cannabis for religious purposes in 2015, and formal apologies coupled with financial reparations for past actions against the Rastafarian community, such as the Coral Gardens incident. Rastafarians still face some societal discrimination, particularly when seeking employment, but community representatives have stated that reports of discrimination have sharply decreased since 2015.

== Mexico ==
The Constitution of Mexico and other laws establish and protect the freedom of religion in Mexico.

A precedent of limiting the rights of the church - especially the Roman Catholic Church - was set by President Valentín Gómez Farías in 1833. Later, President Benito Juárez enacted a set of laws that came to be known as the Leyes de Reforma (or Reform laws) between 1859 and 1863 in the backdrop of the Reform War. These laws mandated, among other things, the separation of church and state, allowed for civil marriages and a civil registry, and confiscated the church's property.

Tensions also existed between the Roman Catholic Church and the post-Revolution Mexican government. Severe restrictions on the rights of the Church and members of the clergy were written into the country's 1917 constitution that led to the eruption of the Cristero War in 1926. In 1992 the government reestablished diplomatic relations with the Holy See and lifted almost all restrictions on the Catholic Church. This later action included granting all religious groups legal status, conceding them limited property rights, and lifting restrictions on the number of priests in the country. However, the law continues to mandate a strict separation of church and state. The constitution still bars members of the clergy from holding public office, advocating partisan political views, supporting political candidates, or opposing the laws or institutions of the state.

The constitution provides that education should avoid privileges of religion, and that one religion or its members may not be given preference in education over another. Religious instruction is prohibited in public schools; however, religious associations are free to maintain private schools, which receive no public funds.

Religious groups may not own or administer broadcast radio or television stations. Government permission is required for commercial broadcast radio or television to transmit religious programming.

In 2023, the country was scored 4 out of 4 for religious freedom.

== Nicaragua ==
The constitution of Nicaragua prohibits religious discrimination and establishes the freedom of religion. It declares that Nicaragua has no state religion, but it also empowers government controlled, community-level organizations called Family Committees to promote "Christian values" at a community level.

Religious groups may register with the government through a process similar to that which is used by NGOs. Registration allows organizations to enter legal contracts and provides some tax exemptions.

The government requires that the educational curriculum for elementary grade students follow the government’s “Christian, Socialist, and Solidarity” principles.

According to the United States International Religious Freedom Report, Nicaragua's government has given preferential treatment to religious organizations with pro-government political stances in the past, and used bureaucratic measures to impede the activities of religious groups that have been critical of the government. Some representatives of Christian groups have also made statements that are critical of the government's usage of Catholic rhetoric and its incorporation of Catholic traditions as government-backed celebrations.

== Panama ==
The Constitution of Panama provides for freedom of religion, and prohibits discrimination based on religion.

The constitution recognizes Catholicism as the religion of the majority of citizens; religious education which focusses on Roman Catholicism must be taught in all public schools, although pupils may officially opt out of this.

In 2023, Panama was scored 4 out of 4 for religious freedom.

== Saint Kitts and Nevis ==
The constitution of Saint Kitts and Nevis establishes the freedom of religion and prohibits discrimination.

Religious organizations are not required to register with the government, but doing so adds them to a database through which the government sends up to date information about policies regarding religion, and allows them to operate as charities.

Public schools include Christian religious instruction and daily prayers, which are optional for students who do not wish to attend them. Religious groups are allowed to establish their own private schools.

The law permits the private use of marijuana, including for religious activities and in registered spaces of worship for members of the Rastafarian faith. The law does not prohibit the wearing of dreadlocks; however, businesses and prisons may restrict the practice for safety or hygiene reasons.

In 2023, Saint Kitts and Nevis was scored 4 out of 4 for religious freedom.

== Saint Lucia ==
The constitution of Saint Lucia establishes the freedom of religion, and prohibits religious instruction without consent in schools, prisons, and the military. An anti-blasphemy law remains part of the legal code of Saint Lucia but is not enforced.

The government requires religious organizations with more than 250 members to register with the government. Upon registering, the groups can further apply for concessions such as tax breaks.

Public schools include optional non-denominational religious education courses for students. Religious groups can run private schools where they are allowed to teach their religion; the government provides about 50% of the funding for these schools.

There are no restrictions on foreign missionaries, although they are required to register with the government and pay a weekly fee of approximately US$74.

In the past, Rastafarians in Saint Lucia have criticized the government's prohibition of cannabis, as this discourages them from engaging in certain religious rituals. Rastafarians have also been also subject to police harassment in connection with cannabis. The government only began recognizing Rastafarian marriages (and thus their children's inheritance rights) in 2017. Muslims in Saint Lucia have been subjected to harassment, especially when wearing religious attire.

In 2023, Saint Lucia was scored 4 out of 4 for religious freedom.

== Saint Vincent and the Grenadines ==
The constitution of Saint Vincent and the Grenadines states that the country "is founded on the belief in the supremacy of God". It further establishes the freedom of conscience and the right to free religious practice in public or private. An anti-blasphemy law is part of the legal code but is not enforced.

Public schools include non-denominational religious curriculums based on Christianity, as well as optional Christian prayer in assemblies. Religious groups are allowed to set up their own schools.

Cannabis is illegal, including for religious use. Rastafarians have criticized this law, as it impedes their ability to practice their religion.

== Trinidad and Tobago ==
The constitution of Trinidad and Tobago establishes the freedom of religion and prohibits religious discrimination. An anti-blasphemy law is part of the legal code but is not enforced.

Religious groups may register with the government in order to be able to perform marriages, sponsor missionaries, or accept tax-exempt donations.

Voluntary religious instruction is available as part of the public school curriculum. The government subsidizes religious private schools affiliated with Christian, Muslim, and Hindu groups. Chaplains from the various religious denominations present in Trinidad and Tobago are able to provide religious services to inmates in prisons.

In 2017, Trinidad and Tobago set a uniform minimum marriage age of 18 years. Previously, different age limits were enforced for different religious groups. While many organizations (and particularly religiously affiliated women's organizations) welcomed this change, some religious organizations such as the orthodox Hindu organization Sanatan Dharma Maha Sabha stated that they would oppose the law on the grounds that it infringes on religious freedom.

The government of Trinidad and Tobago hosts the Inter-Religious Organization, an interfaith coordinating committee with representatives from 25 religious groups, including Christian, Muslim, Hindu, Orisha and Baháʼí Faith groups.

== United States ==
The principle of freedom of religion is officially protected by the US constitution. US Supreme Court rulings have re-stated and expanded upon the legal individual right of freedom of religion within the United States of America.

In the 17th and 18th centuries, many Europeans emigrated to what would later become the United States. For some this was driven at least partly by the desire to worship freely in their own fashion. These included a large number of nonconformists such as the Puritans and the Pilgrims as well as English Catholics. However, with some exceptions, such as William Penn of Pennsylvania or the Roman Catholic Lord Baltimore in Maryland, most of these groups did not believe in religious toleration and in some cases came to America with the explicit aim of setting up an established religion.

=== Treatment of Native American religions ===
Despite the historical protection of the freedom of religion in the US body of law, these rights were not extended to Native Americans for much of US history. With the practice of the Americanization of Native Americans, Native American children were sent to Christian boarding schools where they were forced to worship as Christians and traditional customs were banned. Until the Freedom of Religion Act 1978, "spiritual leaders [of Native Americans] ran the risk of jail sentences of up to 30 years for simply practicing their rituals." The traditional indigenous Sun Dance was illegal from 1904 to the 1980s. Peyote, a hallucinogenic plant used in some Native American religious ceremonies, is illegal in the US, and access to other items used for ceremonies, such as eagle feathers, is restricted. Ancestral remains and lands also have a significant role in Native American religions, and access to both the land and physical remains (many of which are being held in museums) is limited.

=== Treatment of Jews ===
In 2016, the Federal Bureau of Investigation reported that 54.2% of hate crimes motivated by religious bias targeted Jews. Cultural changes from the 1960s onward into the 21st century have caused a large shift in general attitudes such that, in recent years, most Americans surveyed express positive viewpoints regarding Jews, whereas previously antisemitism was more common in American society. An ABC News report in 2007 recounted that about 6% of Americans reported some feelings of prejudice against Jews. According to surveys by the Anti-Defamation League in 2011, antisemitism is rejected by clear majorities of Americans, with 64% of them lauding Jews' cultural contributions to the nation in 2011, but still a minority holding hateful views of Jews remain, with 19% of Americans supporting the antisemitic canard that Jews co-control Wall Street. Holocaust denial has also only been a fringe phenomenon in recent years; As of April 2018 96% of Americans believe the Holocaust occurred.

=== Treatment of Muslims ===
While discrimination along religious lines is officially illegal, discrimination and prejudice against Muslims is common in American society. Muslims face discrimination in the workplace, at airport security checkpoints, and during immigration hearings. Additionally, Muslims are subjected to harassment, and there have been incidents of deadly violence perpetrated against Muslims due to their religion. As a consequence of the Patriot Act, various bodies of the American government have explicitly engaged in the targeted surveillance and infiltration of Muslim communities. Studies have noted that Muslims are disproportionately negatively portrayed as violent in American media.

=== Treatment of atheists ===
In the United States, seven state constitutions include religious tests that would effectively prevent atheists from holding public office, and in some cases being a juror/witness, though these have not generally been enforced since the early twentieth century. As of 2013 there were no publicly atheist legislators in the federal government, although Pete Stark had previously held office in Congress as a public atheist, and it is alleged that several other legislators are atheists but keep their religious beliefs private. Few politicians have been willing to acknowledge their lack of belief in supreme beings, since such revelations have been considered "political suicide". A 2015 Gallup survey found that 40% of Americans would not vote an atheist for president, and in polls prior to 2015, that number had reached about 50%.
