= Mount Saint Catherine (Grenada) =

Mountain in Grenada

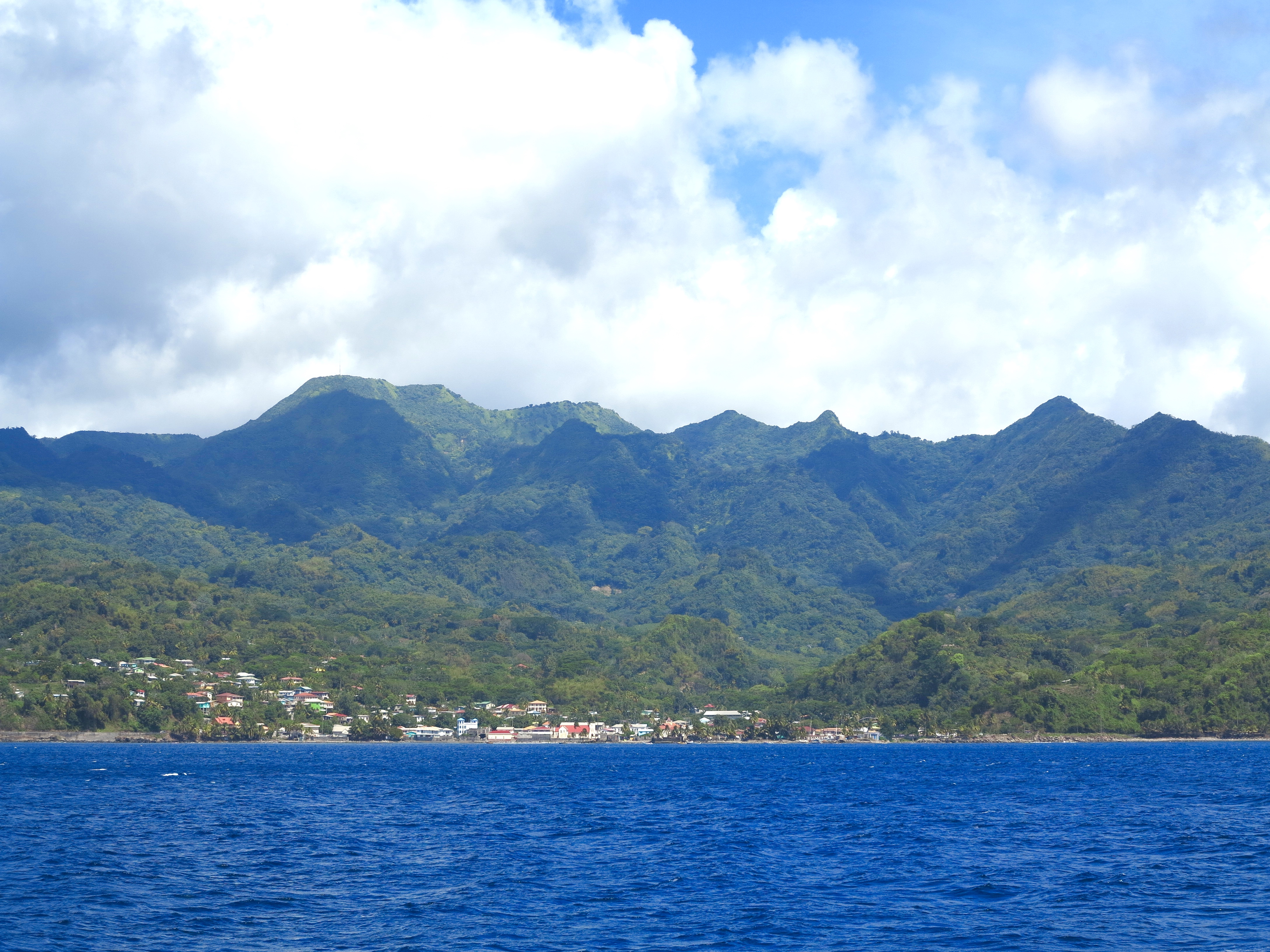
- Mount Saint Catherine

Highest point
- Elevation: 840 m (2,760 ft)
- Prominence: 840 m (2,760 ft)
- Isolation: 127.49 km (79.22 mi) to Richmond Peak
- Listing: Country high point
- Coordinates: 12°09′44″N 61°40′30″W

Geography
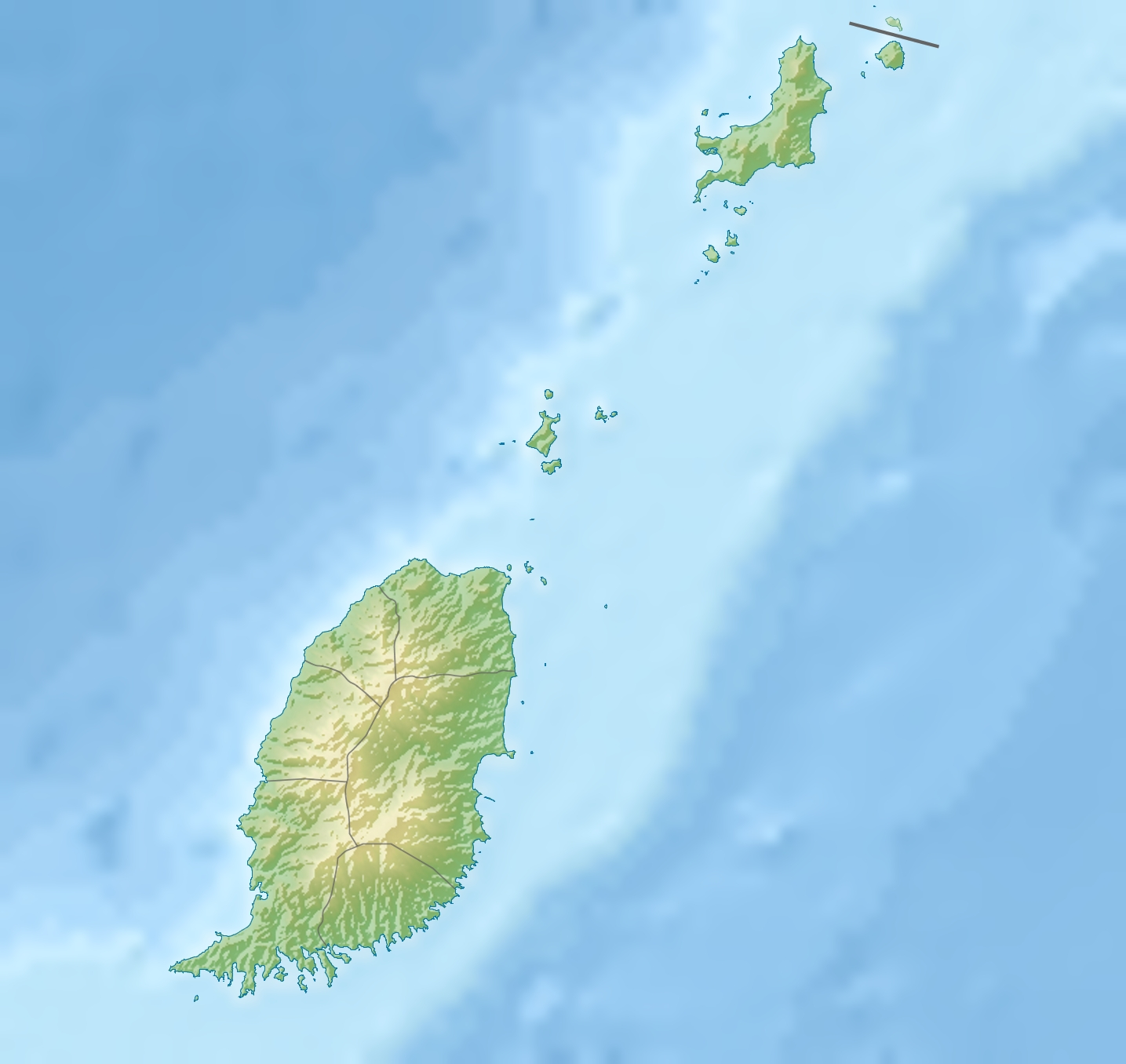
- Location within Grenada
- Location: Saint Mark Parish, Grenada

Geology
- Mountain type: Stratovolcano
- Last eruption: Unknown

Mount Saint Catherine is an extensively weathered stratovolcano mountain and tallest peak on the Caribbean island of Grenada. Its summit marks the dividing line between the parishes of St. Mark and St. Andrew and is one of the highlights of the Mount St. Catherine Forest Reserve.

The Mt. St. Catherine massif is the youngest of the five volcanoes on the island. The volcano has a ~1.5-km horseshoe-shaped crater open to the east, where a complex of volcanic lava domes occur across its flanks and is monitored by the Seismic Research Center of the University of the West Indies. The volcano is considered dormant because it has likely not erupted since the last Ice Age. It is considered to be the only live volcano among the five volcanic centers in Grenada on account of its relatively well preserved morphology and the presence of hot springs and fumaroles on its flanks. Although violent eruptions occurred in the geological past (i.e. Pleistocene—2,588,000 to 11,700 years ago), revealed by voluminous pyroclastic-flow deposits extending northwest of the summit, this type of volcanic activity is now considered unlikely to occur in the near future.

The mountain summit is accessible by three steep rugged routes crossing the forest reserve, from Mt. Horne in the southeast, Mt. Kublal in the northeast, and Tufton Hall from the northwest. Tours are available, as well as guided trips to Tufton Hall Waterfall, the highest waterfalls on the island, off the southeastern flank of the mountain.

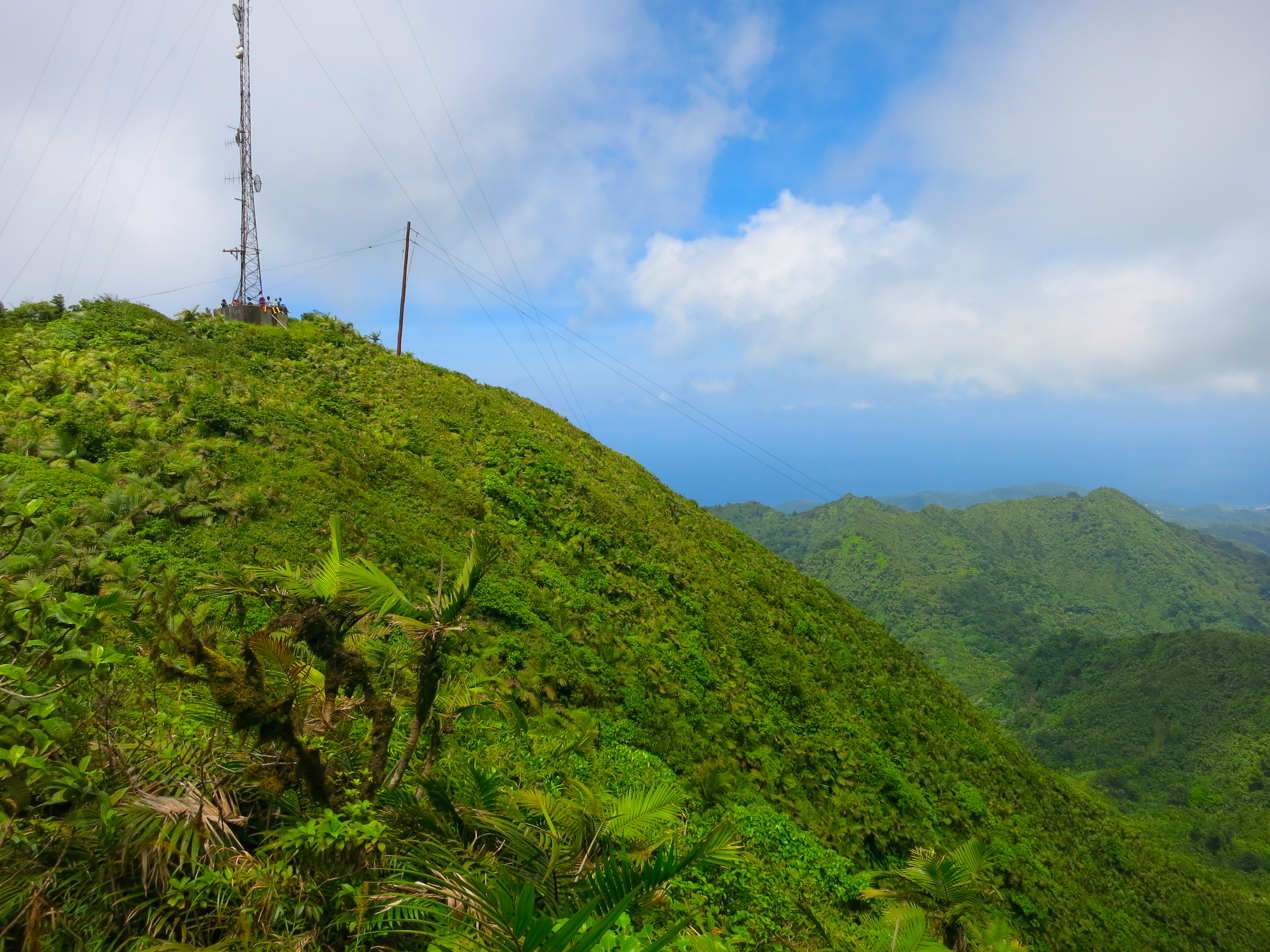
The summit of Mount Saint Catherine as seen from the Mt. Horne eastern trail approach. Visitors are enjoying the view from the radio tower platform vista.

== See also ==
- List of volcanoes in Grenada
