= International rankings of Grenada =

These are the international rankings of Grenada.

== International rankings ==
Organization	Survey	Ranking
United Nations Development Programme	Human Development Index	74 out of 182
