= Telecommunications in Grenada =

Present-day communications in Grenada include telephone, radio, television, and internet usage.

== Telephone ==
Country Code: +1 473
International Call Prefix: 011 (outside NANP)

Calls from Grenada to the US, Canada, and other NANP Caribbean nations, are dialed as 1 + NANP area code + 7-digit number. Calls from Grenada to non-NANP countries are dialed as 011 + country code + phone number with local area code.

The entire country uses the St. George's rate center.

Number Format: nxx-xxxx

Telephones - main lines in use: 32,491 (2017)

Telephones - mobile cellular: 113,177 (2017)

Telephone system:

- Domestic: Inter-island VHF and UHF radiotelephone links.
- international: SHF radiotelephone links to Trinidad and Tobago and Saint Vincent; VHF and UHF radio links to Trinidad.

== Radio ==
Radio broadcast stations: AM 2, FM 13, shortwave 0 (1998), includes ZBF-AM (Klassic AM)

Radios: 57,000 (1997)

== Television ==
Television broadcast stations: 4 (2008)

Televisions: 33,000 (1997)

== Internet ==
Internet service providers (ISPs): Two (2010) - LIME (Cable & Wireless - www.time4lime.com) and Flow (Columbus Communications - www.flowgrenada.com)

Internet subscriptions: 22,235 (2017)

Internet users: 62,123 (July 2016)

Country code (Top-level domain): GD
