= .gd =

Internet country code top-level domain for Grenada

- Introduced: 3 June 1992
- TLD type: Country code top-level domain
- Status: Active
- Registry: nicGD
- Sponsor: National Telecommunications Regulatory Commission
- Intended use: Entities connected with Grenada
- Actual use: Gets some use in Grenada
- Registration restrictions: None
- Structure: Registrations are available directly at second level
- Dispute policies: UDRP
- DNSSEC: Yes
- Registry website: nic.gd

.gd is the country code top-level domain (ccTLD) for Grenada.

== 2013 dispute ==
From March 2013 to May 21, 2013, domain name registrars such as GoDaddy would not accept new registrations for .vg, .tc and .gd domain names.

The domain freeze arose because of legal disputes over the appropriate registrar for those top-level domains. Originally, IANA accredited AdamsNames Ltd. to own and control those top-level domains, but in 2013 a former AdamsNames partner created a new company, Meridian Ltd., which claimed to be the new accredited registry. In response, the National Telecommunications Regulatory Commission (NTRC) made the decision to move the .gd zone under the management of KSRegistry, running as nicGD, as of 1 May 2013. This was to ensure the integrity of the zone and to allow it remain in control and under the responsibility of the NTRC. KSRegistry, as a result of acquiring the zone, had to resolve any discrepancies that may have occurred during the dispute and chose to freeze the zone from changes until May 21, 2013.

Since then, the zone has been re-opened with new policies.

== See also ==
- Internet in Grenada
