= List of volcanoes in Grenada =

Landforms on a Caribbean island

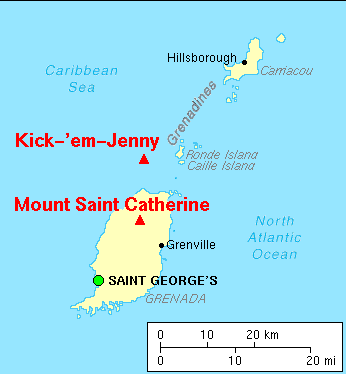
Major volcanoes of Grenada.

Grenada is an island formed by volcanic activity approximately 1-2 million years ago. It is said that the island is completely made of dozens of volcanoes through volcanic activity over a period of time throughout Grenada's formation in history. Ever since then, most of these volcanoes are now extinct except for two underwater submarine volcanoes Kick 'em Jenny and Kick 'em Jack (a smaller less known underwater submarine volcano.) As of today, most of these extinct volcanoes have now become volcano crater lakes and mountains such as the Grand Etang or Lake Antoine (Grenada) and Mount Saint Catherine (Grenada).

This is a list of active and extinct volcanoes in Grenada.

Name	Elevation		Location	Last eruption
Name	meters	feet	Coordinates	Last eruption
Kick 'em Jenny	-168	-607	12.300°N 61.640°W	July 2015
Mount Saint Catherine	840	2,756	12.15°N 61.67°W	Approximately 1-2 million years ago
Grand Etang	530	1,740	12.300°N 61.640°W	Approximately 2 million years ago
Lake Antoine	unknown	unknown	12.300°N 61.640°W	Approximately 2 million years ago
