= List of birds of Grenada =

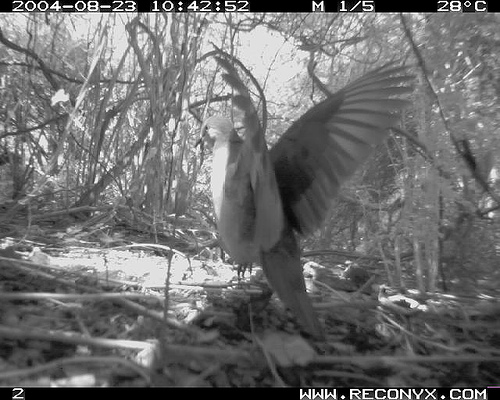
The Grenada dove is the national bird of Grenada.

This is a list of the bird species recorded in Grenada. The avifauna of Grenada included a total of 197 species according to Bird Checklists of the World as of July 2022. Of them, one is endemic, six have been introduced by humans, and 127 are rare or accidental. One species on the list has been extirpated and one is probably extinct.

This list is presented in the taxonomic sequence of the Check-list of North and Middle American Birds, 7th edition through the 63rd Supplement, published by the American Ornithological Society (AOS). Common and scientific names are also those of the Check-list, except that the common names of families are from the Clements taxonomy because the AOS list does not include them.

The following tags have been used to highlight several categories of occurrence.

- (A) Accidental - a species that rarely or accidentally occurs in Grenada
- (E) Endemic - a species endemic to Grenada
- (I) Introduced - a species introduced by humans either directly to Grenada or elsewhere in the New World
- (Ex) Extirpated - a species that no longer occurs in Grenada although populations exist elsewhere

== Ducks, geese, and waterfowl ==
Order: Anseriformes Family: Anatidae

Anatidae includes the ducks and most duck-like waterfowl, such as geese and swans. These birds are adapted to an aquatic existence with webbed feet, flattened bills, and feathers that are excellent at shedding water due to an oily coating.

- Black-bellied whistling-duck, Dendrocygna autumnalis (A)
- West Indian whistling-duck, Dendrocygna arborea (A)
- Fulvous whistling-duck, Dendrocygna bicolor (A)
- Blue-winged teal, Spatula discors (A)
- Northern shoveler, Spatula clypeata
- Gadwall, Mareca strepera (A)
- American wigeon, Mareca americana
- White-cheeked pintail, Anas bahamensis (A)
- Northern pintail, Anas acuta
- Green-winged teal, Anas crecca
- Ring-necked duck, Aythya collaris
- Lesser scaup, Aythya affinis
- Masked duck, Nomonyx dominicus (A)
- Ruddy duck, Oxyura jamaicensis

== Guans, chachalacas, and allies ==
Order: Galliformes Family: Cracidae

The Cracidae are large birds, similar in general appearance to turkeys. The guans and curassows live in trees, but the smaller chachalacas are found in more open scrubby habitats. They are generally dull-plumaged, but the curassows and some guans have colourful facial ornaments.

- Rufous-vented chachalaca, Ortalis ruficauda

== Pheasants, grouse, and allies ==
Order: Galliformes Family: Phasianidae

The Phasianidae are a family of terrestrial birds which consists of quails, partridges, snowcocks, francolins, spurfowls, tragopans, monals, pheasants, peafowls, and jungle fowls. In general, they are plump (although they vary in size) and have broad, relatively short wings.

- Red junglefowl, Gallus gallus (I)

== Flamingos ==
Order: Phoenicopteriformes Family: Phoenicopteridae

Flamingos are gregarious wading birds, usually 3 to 5 feet (0.9 to 1.5 m) tall, found in both the Western and Eastern Hemispheres. Flamingos filter-feed on shellfish and algae. Their oddly shaped beaks are specially adapted to separate mud and silt from the food they consume and, uniquely, are used upside-down.

- American flamingo, Phoenicopterus ruber (A)

== Grebes ==
Order: Podicipediformes Family: Podicipedidae

Grebes are small to medium-large freshwater diving birds. They have lobed toes and are excellent swimmers and divers. However, they have their feet placed far back on the body, making them quite ungainly on land.

- Least grebe, Tachybaptus dominicus (A)
- Pied-billed grebe, Podilymbus podiceps (A)

== Pigeons and doves ==
Order: Columbiformes Family: Columbidae

Pigeons and doves are stout-bodied birds with short necks and short slender bills with a fleshy cere.

- Rock pigeon, Columba livia (I)
- Scaly-naped pigeon, Patagioenas squamosa
- African collared-dove, Streptopelia roseogrisea (I) (A)
- Eurasian collared-dove, Streptopelia decaocto (I) (A)
- Common ground dove, Columbina passerina
- Ruddy quail-dove, Geotrygon montana
- Grenada dove, Leptotila wellsi (E)
- Zenaida dove, Zenaida aurita
- Eared dove, Zenaida auriculata

== Cuckoos ==
Order: Cuculiformes Family: Cuculidae

The family Cuculidae includes cuckoos, roadrunners, and anis. These birds are of variable size with slender bodies, long tails, and strong legs.

- Smooth-billed ani, Crotophaga ani
- Yellow-billed cuckoo, Coccyzus americanus (A)
- Mangrove cuckoo, Coccyzus minor

== Swifts ==
Order: Apodiformes Family: Apodidae

Swifts are small birds which spend the majority of their lives flying. These birds have very short legs and never settle voluntarily on the ground, perching instead only on vertical surfaces. Many swifts have long swept-back wings which resemble a crescent or boomerang.

- Black swift, Cypseloides niger (A)
- White-collared swift, Streptoprocne zonaris (A)
- Short-tailed swift, Chaetura brachyura
- Gray-rumped swift, Chaetura cinereiventris

== Hummingbirds ==
Order: Apodiformes Family: Trochilidae

Hummingbirds are small birds capable of hovering in mid-air due to the rapid flapping of their wings. They are the only birds that can fly backwards.

- Rufous-breasted hermit, Glaucis hirsuta
- Purple-throated carib, Eulampis jugularis
- Green-throated carib, Eulampis holosericeus
- Antillean crested hummingbird, Orthorhyncus cristatus

== Rails, gallinules, and coots ==
Order: Gruiformes Family: Rallidae

Rallidae is a large family of small to medium-sized birds which includes the rails, crakes, coots, and gallinules. Typically they inhabit dense vegetation in damp environments near lakes, swamps, or rivers. In general they are shy and secretive birds, making them difficult to observe. Most species have strong legs and long toes which are well adapted to soft uneven surfaces. They tend to have short, rounded wings and to be weak fliers.

- Sora, Porzana carolina (A)
- Common gallinule, Gallinula galeata (A)
- American coot, Fulica americana (A)
- Purple gallinule, Porphyrio martinica

== Stilts and avocets ==
Order: Charadriiformes Family: Recurvirostridae

Recurvirostridae is a family of large wading birds which includes the avocets and stilts. The avocets have long legs and long up-curved bills. The stilts have extremely long legs and long, thin, straight bills.

- Black-necked stilt, Himantopus mexicanus (A)

== Oystercatchers ==
Order: Charadriiformes Family: Haematopodidae

The oystercatchers are large and noisy plover-like birds, with strong bills used for smashing or prising open molluscs.

- American oystercatcher, Haematopus palliatus (A)

== Plovers and lapwings ==
Order: Charadriiformes Family: Charadriidae

The family Charadriidae includes the plovers, dotterels, and lapwings. They are small to medium-sized birds with compact bodies, short thick necks, and long, usually pointed, wings. They are found in open country worldwide, mostly in habitats near water.

- Southern lapwing, Vanellus chilensis
- Black-bellied plover, Pluvialis squatarola (A)
- American golden-plover, Pluvialis dominica (A)
- Killdeer, Charadrius vociferus (A)
- Semipalmated plover, Charadrius semipalmatus (A)
- Wilson's plover, Charadrius wilsonia (A)
- Collared plover, Charadrius collaris (A)

== Sandpipers and allies ==
Order: Charadriiformes Family: Scolopacidae

Scolopacidae is a large diverse family of small to medium-sized shorebirds including the sandpipers, curlews, godwits, shanks, tattlers, woodcocks, snipes, dowitchers, and phalaropes. The majority of these species eat small invertebrates picked out of the mud or soil. Variation in length of legs and bills enables multiple species to feed in the same habitat, particularly on the coast, without direct competition for food.

- Upland sandpiper, Bartramia longicauda (A)
- Whimbrel, Numenius phaeopus
- Eskimo curlew, Numenius borealis (A) (possibly extinct)
- Long-billed curlew, Numenius americanus (A)
- Hudsonian godwit, Limosa haemastica (A)
- Marbled godwit, Limosa fedoa (A)
- Ruddy turnstone, Arenaria interpres (A)
- Red knot, Calidris canutus (A)
- Ruff, Calidris pugnax (A)
- Stilt sandpiper, Calidris himantopus (A)
- Curlew sandpiper, Calidris ferruginea (A)
- Sanderling, Calidris alba (A)
- Baird's sandpiper, Calidris bairdii (A)
- Least sandpiper, Calidris minutilla (A)
- White-rumped sandpiper, Calidris fuscicollis (A)
- Buff-breasted sandpiper, Calidris subruficollis (A)
- Pectoral sandpiper, Calidris melanotos (A)
- Semipalmated sandpiper, Calidris pusilla (A)
- Western sandpiper, Calidris mauri (A)
- Short-billed dowitcher, Limnodromus griseus (A)
- Wilson's snipe, Gallinago delicata (A)
- Spotted sandpiper, Actitis macularia (A)
- Solitary sandpiper, Tringa solitaria (A)
- Lesser yellowlegs, Tringa flavipes (A)
- Willet, Tringa semipalmata (A)
- Greater yellowlegs, Tringa melanoleuca (A)
- Wilson's phalarope, Phalaropus tricolor (A)

== Skuas and jaegers ==
Order: Charadriiformes Family: Stercorariidae

The family Stercorariidae are, in general, medium to large birds, typically with grey or brown plumage, often with white markings on the wings. They nest on the ground in temperate and arctic regions and are long-distance migrants.

- Parasitic jaeger, Stercorarius parasiticus (A)

== Gulls, terns, and skimmers ==
Order: Charadriiformes Family: Laridae

Laridae is a family of medium to large seabirds and includes gulls, kittiwakes, terns, and skimmers. They are typically grey or white, often with black markings on the head or wings. They have longish bills and webbed feet. Terns are a group of generally medium to large seabirds typically with grey or white plumage, often with black markings on the head. Most terns hunt fish by diving but some pick insects off the surface of fresh water. Terns are generally long-lived birds, with several species known to live in excess of 30 years. Skimmers are a small family of tropical tern-like birds. They have an elongated lower mandible which they use to feed by flying low over the water surface and skimming the water for small fish.

- Black-headed gull, Chroicocephalus ridibundus (A)
- Laughing gull, Leucophaeus atricilla
- Franklin's gull, Leucophaeus pipixcan (A)
- Ring-billed gull, Larus delawarensis (A)
- Herring gull, Larus argentatus (A)
- Lesser black-backed gull, Larus fuscus (A)
- Brown noddy, Anous stolidus
- Sooty tern, Onychoprion fuscata (A)
- Bridled tern, Onychoprion anaethetus (A)
- Least tern, Sternula antillarum (A)
- Large-billed tern, Phaetusa simplex (A)
- Gull-billed tern, Gelochelidon nilotica (A)
- Black tern, Chlidonias niger (A)
- Roseate tern, Sterna dougallii (A)
- Common tern, Sterna hirundo (A)
- Royal tern, Thalasseus maxima
- Sandwich tern, Thalasseus sandvicensis (A)
- Black skimmer, Rynchops niger (A)

== Tropicbirds ==
Order: Phaethontiformes Family: Phaethontidae

Tropicbirds are slender white birds of tropical oceans with exceptionally long central tail feathers. Their heads and long wings have black markings.

- White-tailed tropicbird, Phaethon lepturus (A)
- Red-billed tropicbird, Phaethon aethereus (A)

== Southern storm-petrels ==
Order: Procellariiformes Family: Oceanitidae

The storm-petrels are relatives of the petrels and are the smallest seabirds. They feed on planktonic crustaceans and small fish picked from the surface, typically while hovering. The flight is fluttering and sometimes bat-like.

- Wilson's storm-petrel, Oceanites oceanicus (A)

== Shearwaters and petrels ==
Order: Procellariiformes Family: Procellariidae

The procellariids are the main group of medium-sized "true petrels", characterised by united nostrils with medium septum and a long outer functional primary.

- Great shearwater, Ardenna gravis (A)
- Manx shearwater, Puffinus puffinus (A)
- Sargasso shearwater, Puffinus lherminieri (A)

== Storks ==
Order: Ciconiiformes Family: Ciconiidae

Storks are large, long-legged, long-necked, wading birds with long, stout bills. Storks are mute, but bill-clattering is an important mode of communication at the nest. Their nests can be large and may be reused for many years. Many species are migratory.

- Jabiru, Jabiru mycteria (A)

== Frigatebirds ==
Order: Suliformes Family: Fregatidae

Frigatebirds are large seabirds usually found over tropical oceans. They are large, black and white, or completely black, with long wings and deeply forked tails. The males have coloured inflatable throat pouches. They do not swim or walk and cannot take off from a flat surface. Having the largest wingspan-to-body-weight ratio of any bird, they are essentially aerial, able to stay aloft for more than a week.

- Magnificent frigatebird, Fregata magnificens

== Boobies and gannets ==
Order: Suliformes Family: Sulidae

The sulids comprise the gannets and boobies. Both groups are medium to large coastal seabirds that plunge-dive for fish.

- Masked booby, Sula dactylatra (A)
- Brown booby, Sula leucogaster
- Red-footed booby, Sula sula (A)
- Northern gannet, Morus bassanus (A)

== Anhingas ==
Order: Suliformes Family: Anhingidae

Anhingas are often called "snake-birds" because of their long thin neck, which gives a snake-like appearance when they swim with their bodies submerged. The males have black and dark-brown plumage, an erectile crest on the nape, and a larger bill than the female. The females have much paler plumage especially on the neck and underparts. The darters have completely webbed feet and their legs are short and set far back on the body. Their plumage is somewhat permeable, like that of cormorants, and they spread their wings to dry after diving.

- Anhinga, Anhinga anhinga (A)

== Pelicans ==
Order: Pelecaniformes Family: Pelecanidae

Pelicans are large water birds with a distinctive pouch under their beak. As with other members of the order Pelecaniformes, they have webbed feet with four toes.

- Brown pelican, Pelecanus occidentalis (A)

== Herons, egrets, and bitterns ==
Order: Pelecaniformes Family: Ardeidae

The family Ardeidae contains the bitterns, herons, and egrets. Herons and egrets are medium to large wading birds with long necks and legs. Bitterns tend to be shorter necked and more wary. Members of Ardeidae fly with their necks retracted, unlike other long-necked birds such as storks, ibises, and spoonbills.

- Great blue heron, Ardea herodias (A)
- Great egret, Ardea alba
- Little egret, Egretta garzetta (A)
- Snowy egret, Egretta thula (A)
- Little blue heron, Egretta caerulea (A)
- Tricolored heron, Egretta tricolor (A)
- Cattle egret, Bubulcus ibis
- Green heron, Butorides virescens
- Striated heron, Butorides striata (A)
- Black-crowned night-heron, Nycticorax nycticorax (A)
- Yellow-crowned night-heron, Nyctanassa violacea (A)

== Ibises and spoonbills ==
Order: Pelecaniformes Family: Threskiornithidae

Threskiornithidae is a family of large terrestrial and wading birds which includes the ibises and spoonbills. They have long, broad wings with 11 primary and about 20 secondary feathers. They are strong fliers and despite their size and weight, very capable soarers.

- Scarlet ibis, Eudocimus ruber (A)
- Glossy ibis, Plegadis falcinellus
- Roseate spoonbill, Platalea ajaja

== New World vultures ==
Order: Cathartiformes Family: Cathartidae

The New World vultures are not closely related to Old World vultures, but superficially resemble them because of convergent evolution. Like the Old World vultures, they are scavengers. However, unlike Old World vultures, which find carcasses by sight, New World vultures have a good sense of smell with which they locate carrion.

- Black vulture, Coragyps atratus (A)

== Osprey ==
Order: Accipitriformes Family: Pandionidae

The family Pandionidae contains only one species, the osprey. The osprey is a medium-large raptor which is a specialist fish-eater with a worldwide distribution.

- Osprey, Pandion haliaetus (A)

== Hawks, eagles, and kites ==
Order: Accipitriformes Family: Accipitridae

Accipitridae is a family of birds of prey, which includes hawks, eagles, kites, harriers, and Old World vultures. These birds have powerful hooked beaks for tearing flesh from their prey, strong legs, powerful talons, and keen eyesight.

- Hook-billed kite, Chondrohierax uncinatus
- Snail kite, Rostrhamus sociabilis (A)
- Black kite, Milvus migrans (A)
- Common black hawk, Buteogallus anthracinus
- Broad-winged hawk, Buteo platypterus

== Barn-owls ==
Order: Strigiformes Family: Tytonidae

Barn-owls are medium to large owls with large heads and characteristic heart-shaped faces. They have long strong legs with powerful talons.

- American barn owl, Tyto furcata

== Kingfishers ==
Order: Coraciiformes Family: Alcedinidae

Kingfishers are medium-sized birds with large heads, long pointed bills, short legs, and stubby tails.

- Ringed kingfisher, Megaceryle torquata
- Belted kingfisher, Megaceryle alcyon (A)

== Toucans ==
Order: Piciformes Family: Ramphastidae

Toucans are near passerine birds from the Neotropics. They are brightly marked and have enormous, colorful bills which in some species amount to half their body length.

- Channel-billed toucan, Ramphastos vitellinus (I)

== Falcons and caracaras ==
Order: Falconiformes Family: Falconidae

Falconidae is a family of diurnal birds of prey. They differ from hawks, eagles, and kites in that they kill with their beaks instead of their talons.

- Yellow-headed caracara, Milvago chimachima (A)
- American kestrel, Falco sparverius (A)
- Merlin, Falco columbarius (A)
- Peregrine falcon, Falco peregrinus

== New World and African parrots ==
Order: Psittaciformes Family: Psittacidae

Parrots are small to large birds with a characteristic curved beak. Their upper mandibles have slight mobility in the joint with the skull and they have a generally erect stance. All parrots are zygodactyl, having the four toes on each foot placed two at the front and two to the back.

- Scarlet macaw, Ara macao

== Tyrant flycatchers ==
Order: Passeriformes Family: Tyrannidae

Tyrant flycatchers are passerine birds which occur throughout North and South America. They superficially resemble the Old World flycatchers, but are more robust and have stronger bills. They do not have the sophisticated vocal capabilities of the songbirds. Most, but not all, have plain colouring. As the name implies, most are insectivorous.

- Caribbean elaenia, Elaenia martinica
- Yellow-bellied elaenia, Elaenia flavogaster
- Grenada flycatcher, Myiarchus nugator
- Tropical kingbird, Tyrannus melancholicus (A)
- Gray kingbird, Tyrannus dominicensis
- Fork-tailed flycatcher, Tyrannus savana (A)
- Euler's flycatcher, Lathrotriccus euleri (Ex)

== Vireos, shrike-babblers, and erpornis ==
Order: Passeriformes Family: Vireonidae

The vireos are a group of small to medium-sized passerine birds. They are typically greenish in colour and resemble New World warblers apart from their heavier bills.

- Yellow-throated vireo, Vireo flavifrons (A)
- Red-eyed vireo, Vireo olivaceus (A)
- Black-whiskered vireo, Vireo altiloquus
- Yucatan vireo, Vireo magister (A)

== Swallows ==
Order: Passeriformes Family: Hirundinidae

The family Hirundinidae is adapted to aerial feeding. They have a slender streamlined body, long pointed wings, and a short bill with a wide gape. The feet are adapted to perching rather than walking, and the front toes are partially joined at the base.

- Bank swallow, Riparia riparia (A)
- Caribbean martin, Progne dominicensis
- White-winged swallow, Tachycineta albiventer (A)
- Barn swallow, Hirundo rustica
- Cliff swallow, Petrochelidon pyrrhonota (A)

== Wrens ==
Order: Passeriformes Family: Troglodytidae

The wrens are mainly small and inconspicuous except for their loud songs. These birds have short wings and thin down-turned bills. Several species often hold their tails upright. All are insectivorous.

- House wren, Troglodytes aedon

== Mockingbirds and thrashers ==
Order: Passeriformes Family: Mimidae

The mimids are a family of passerine birds that includes thrashers, mockingbirds, tremblers, and the New World catbirds. These birds are notable for their vocalizations, especially their ability to mimic a wide variety of birds and other sounds heard outdoors. Their colouring tends towards dull-greys and browns.

- Scaly-breasted thrasher, Allenia fusca (A)
- Pearly-eyed thrasher, Margarops fuscatus
- Brown trembler, Cinclocerthia ruficauda (A)
- Tropical mockingbird, Mimus gilvus

== Starlings ==
Order: Passeriformes Family: Sturnidae

Starlings and mynas are small to medium-sized Old World passerine birds with strong feet. Their flight is strong and direct and most are very gregarious. Their preferred habitat is fairly open country, and they eat insects and fruit. The plumage of several species is dark with a metallic sheen.

- European starling, Sturnus vulgaris (I) (A)

== Thrushes and allies ==
Order: Passeriformes Family: Turdidae

The thrushes are a group of passerine birds that occur mainly in the Old World. They are plump, soft plumaged, small to medium-sized insectivores or sometimes omnivores, often feeding on the ground. Many have attractive songs.

- Gray-cheeked thrush, Catharus minimus
- Cocoa thrush, Turdus fumigatus
- Spectacled thrush, Turdus nudigenis

== Old World sparrows ==
Order: Passeriformes Family: Passeridae

Old World sparrows are small passerine birds. In general, sparrows tend to be small plump brownish or greyish birds with short tails and short powerful beaks. Sparrows are seed eaters, but they also consume small insects.

- House sparrow, Passer domesticus (I) (A)

== Finches, euphonias, and allies ==
Order: Passeriformes Family: Fringillidae

Finches are seed-eating passerine birds, that are small to moderately large and have a strong beak, usually conical and in some species very large. All have twelve tail feathers and nine primaries. These birds have a bouncing flight with alternating bouts of flapping and gliding on closed wings, and most sing well.

- Lesser Antillean euphonia, Chlorophonia flavifrons (A)

== Troupials and allies ==
Order: Passeriformes Family: Icteridae

The icterids are a group of small to medium-sized, often colourful, passerine birds restricted to the New World and include the grackles, New World blackbirds, and New World orioles. Most species have black as the predominant plumage colour, often enlivened by yellow, orange, or red.

- Bobolink, Dolichonyx oryzivorus (A)
- Venezuelan troupial, Icterus icterus (A)
- Yellow oriole, Icterus nigrogularis (A)
- Baltimore oriole, Icterus galbula (A)
- Shiny cowbird, Molothrus bonariensis
- Carib grackle, Quiscalus lugubris

== New World warblers ==
Order: Passeriformes Family: Parulidae

The New World warblers are a group of small, often colourful, passerine birds restricted to the New World. Most are arboreal, but some are terrestrial. Most members of this family are insectivores.

- Louisiana waterthrush, Parkesia motacilla
- Northern waterthrush, Parkesia noveboracensis (A)
- Black-and-white warbler, Mniotilta varia
- Prothonotary warbler, Protonotaria citrea (A)
- American redstart, Setophaga ruticilla (A)
- Cape May warbler, Setophaga tigrina (A)
- Northern parula, Setophaga americana (A)
- Blackburnian warbler, Setophaga fusca (A)
- Yellow warbler, Setophaga petechia
- Blackpoll warbler, Setophaga striata (A)
- Prairie warbler, Setophaga discolor (A)

== Cardinals and allies ==
Order: Passeriformes Family: Cardinalidae

The cardinals are a family of robust, seed-eating birds with strong bills. They are typically associated with open woodland. The sexes usually have distinct plumages.

- Summer tanager, Piranga rubra (A)
- Scarlet tanager, Piranga olivacea (A)
- Rose-breasted grosbeak, Pheucticus ludovicianus

== Tanagers and allies ==
Order: Passeriformes Family: Thraupidae

The tanagers are a large group of small to medium-sized passerine birds restricted to the New World, mainly in the tropics. Many species are brightly coloured. Many species are brightly coloured. As a family they are omnivorous, but individual species specialize in eating fruits, seeds, insects, or other types of food. Most have short, rounded wings.

- Palm tanager, Thraupis palmarum (A)
- Lesser Antillean tanager, Sicalis cucullata
- Grassland yellow-finch, Sicalis luteola (A)
- Blue-black grassquit, Volatinia jacarina
- Bananaquit, Coereba flaveola
- Lesser Antillean bullfinch, Loxigilla noctis
- Black-faced grassquit, Melanospiza bicolor
- Yellow-bellied seedeater, Sporophila nigricollis (A)

== See also ==
- List of birds
- Lists of birds by region
