= List of hospitals in Grenada =

This is a list of hospitals in Grenada.

- General Hospital – St. George's
- Mount Gay Hospital – St. George's
- Old Trafford Medical Center – St. George's
- Princess Alice Hospital – St. Andrew Parish
- Princess Royal Hospital – Hillsborough, Carriacou Island
- St Augustine's Medical Services – St. George's
- St. George's University School of Medicine – St. George's
- Marryshows' Hospital & Health Clinic – St. George's
- Salus Clinic – St. George's
