= Grenadian Creole French =

Variety of Antillean French Creole

Grenadian Creole
- Patwa LaGwinad/Kéyòl-La-Gwinad
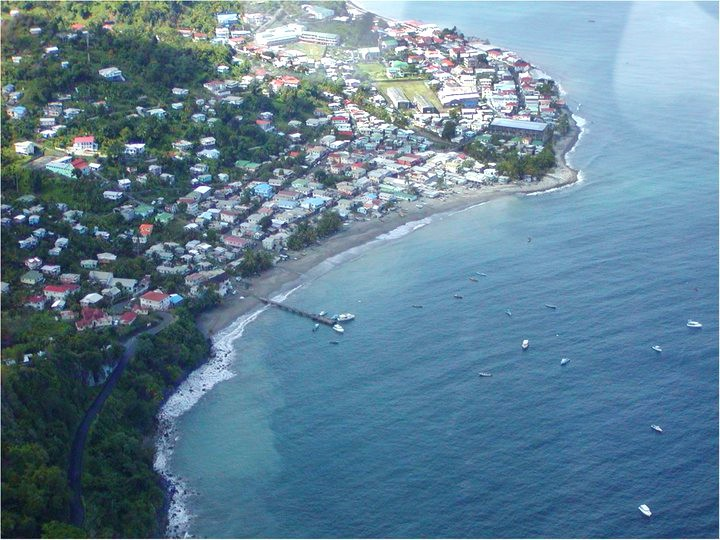
- Aerial photo of Gouyave, where a majority of Creole speakers live
- Native to: Grenada
- Native speakers: 2,300 (2004)
- Language family: French Creole: Antillean Creole; Grenadian Creole

Official status
- Official language in: Grenada

Language codes
- ISO 639-3: acf

Grenadian Creole is a variety of Antillean Creole. In Grenada and among Grenadians, it is referred to as patois or Kéyòl-La-Gwinad. The language is also spoken in Carriacou, Petite Martinique, and Trinidad (in a slightly different form referred to as Trinidadian French-Creole).

== History ==
Following several unsuccessful attempts by Europeans to colonise the island due to resistance from resident Island Caribs, French settlement and colonisation began in 1649 and continued for the next century. On 10 February 1763, Grenada was ceded to the British under the Treaty of Paris. British rule continued until 1974 (except for a brief French takeover between 1779 and 1783). The language started to die out in the 1940s and 50s. Today most of the population speaks Grenadian Creole English; however, some communities retain the French creole, especially among older folk.

== Sample words and expressions ==
- bebé [French: bébé]: A foolish person. Literally, 'baby'.
- bondjé [French: bon Dieu]: 'Good God!'
- disabill [French 'dishabile']: Sloppy or run-down.
- dou-dou [French 'doux']: Darling or Sweetheart. A term of endearment.
- djoukoutou [French 'jusqu'à vous']: "Even someone as unimportant as you," used derisively. e.g., "Djoukoutou Freddy and all going to that party."
- flambo [French 'flambeau']: A blazing torch made with wood, fabric, and kerosene.
- fet [French 'fête']: A party
- galé [French 'galeux']: Pejorative description of someone with a scabby rash or itchy skin disease. e.g. "Look at his arms--they galé!"
- ladjabless [French 'La Diablesse']: A devil woman from Caribbean folklore.
- lougarou [French 'loup-garou']: A werewolf.
- shado beni [French 'chardon béni']: Eryngium foetidum, an herb used for cooking. Also known as recao or Mexican coriander.
- soungoo [French 'sans goût']: a description of a person who is dispirited or lacking energy, e.g. "Why Jenny so soungoo?
- takté [French 'tacheté']: Spotted or speckled skin, referring to either people or fruit.
- tébé [French 'débat']: Strife and conflict between persons, spawned by gossiping.
- too-tool-bay [French 'totalement bête']: the state of being dazed and confused, as when "head over heels" in love, e.g. "Mary turned Desmond too-tool-bay."
- toot bagay [French 'tout bagage']: any and everything, e.g. "He pack up his house, toot bagay, and move to Sautiers."
- zagada [French 'lézard']: Ameiva ameiva, a ground lizard found in Grenada, South America, and other Caribbean islands.

== Phrases and examples ==
- Anmwé! Kay mwen pwi difé! - Help! My house on fire!
- Ba boulé La Gwouyav. - Don't burn down Gouyave.
- Ba di mwen sa. - Don't tell me that.
- Ba li yon koul pyé! - Give him a kick!
- Bagay la sé sla'w. - The thing is yours.
- Ban mwen piti tak dlo pou mon bwè. - Give me a little bit of water for me to drink.
- Bondjé senyè! - God lord!
- Chantwèl sala sòti Gran Pouvwa. - This singer is from Victoria.
- Denmen sé Vandwèdi. - Tomorrow is Friday.
- Di yé mon wivé. - Tell them I arrive.
- Dimanch pwochenn nou ké alé légliz. - Next Sunday we will go to church.
- Éti ou ka alé? - Where you going?
- Fanm la ka hélé. - The woman screaming.
- Fi-a yé malévé kon manman yé. - The girl them rude as their mother.
- Gadé mizè mwen. - Look at my misery.
- Gwan fwè mwen té ka lwé yon lakay nan Labé avan I alé L'anglité. - My elder brother was renting a house in Grenville before he went to England.
- I ba konn palé patwa. - He cannot speak patois.
- I b'oko wivé. - She has not arrived as yet.
- I ka fè cho. - It making hot.
- Ich mwen apwann anglé nan/an lékòl. - My child learnt English in school.
- Jenn fi-a yé pwan kouwi. - The young girl them start to run.
- Jida yé ba vlé wè mwen. - Hypocrite them don't want to see me.
- Jézi mò l'asou lakwa pou péché nou. - Jesus die on the cross for our sins.
- Ki moun sa? - Who is that?
- Kouman ou yé? - How are you?
- Konpè Lapen épi Konpè Zayen sé bon kanmawad. Compere Rabbit and Compere Spider (Anansi) are good friends.
- Kon sa mon touvé'y, kon sa mon ba'w. - Like that I found it, like that I give you.
- La Gwinad mon lévé. - Grenada I grow up.
- Lapli ka vini! - Rain coming!
- Lè mon té on piti gason. Mon té ka jwé jwèt nan lawi-a. - When I was a little boy. I used to play games in the street.
- Lougarou épi Soukouyan ka volé nan nwit. - Lougaroo and Soucouyan flying in the night.
- Mama Maladi sé on-denmou. - Mama Maladi is a demon.
- Mété sèl ladan'y. - Put salt inside it.
- Mété enpé sik adidan'y ban mwen. - Put a little bit of sugar in it for me.
- Mon konn palé enpé Panyòl. - I can speak a little bit of Spanish.
- Mon ka wété Lapèl. - I'm residing in Pearls.
- Mouché/Mizyé Pierre épi fanm-li dégouté fanmi-mwen. - Mister Pierre and his woman dislike my family.
- Moun Pawadi pè'y pas I sé on moro. - Paradise (village) people fear him because he is a "badman".
- Nonk mwen alé Twinité lanné pasé - My uncle went to Trinidad last year.
- Nonm sa yé sòti Babad. - This man them come from Barbados.
- Nou ba sa tann ou! - We can't hear you!
- Nennenn mwen di mwen sa. - My Godmother told me that.
- Ou vòlò pasé mwen. - You thief more than me.
- Ou sé on Salòpwi. - You're a filthy bastard.
- Parenn mon ja mouri. - My Godfather is already dead.
- Papa li sété on béké épi manman li sété on nègess. - Her father was a white man and her mother was a negro.
- Patwa sé lanng nou. - Patois is our language (tongue).
- Pouki I vlé mayé salopri sala? - Why she want to marry this crook.
- Sa ba vwé. - That not true.
- Sa ki fè'w? - What do you?
- Sa ki non'w? - What's your name?
- Sa ki tann palé lòt. - He who hear tell the other.
- Sa sa yé? - What that is?
- Sé menm bagay. - Is the same thing.
- Sla'w sé sla'w! - Yours is yours!
- Tonnè ka woulé. Thunder rolling.
- Toulé jou..nou ni pou alé nan la'ivyè pou benyen. -Everyday we have to go the river to bathe.
- Tout moun konnen sa. - Everybody know that.
- Wen mwen ka fè mwen mal. - My waist is hurting me.
- Vini isi-a. - Come here.
- Yé vini wè mwen. - They come to see me.
- Yé vlé tchouyé mwen. - They want to kill me.
