= Tufton Hall Waterfall =

Waterfall in Grenada

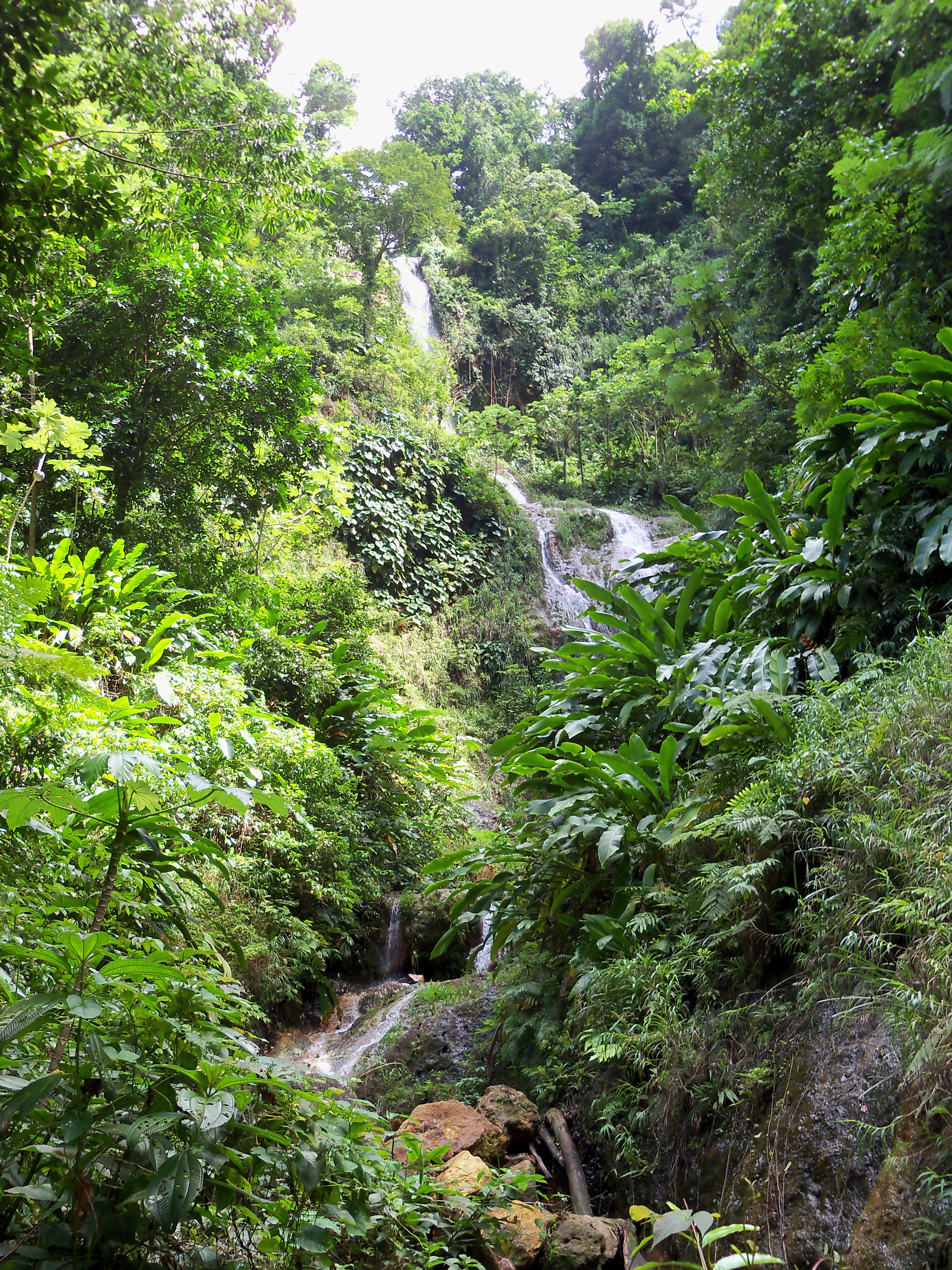
Tufton Hall Falls, Grenada

The Tufton Hall Waterfall is located in St. Mark's Parish, just outside Victoria, Grenada. It is the tallest waterfall in Grenada, with the approximate height of 25 m. The only way to visit the waterfall is to hike for approximately 3 hours (each way) through technical and somewhat strenuous terrain. Guides from Victoria are available, usually carrying rope and cutlass.

A challenging hike, much of it is over boulders in a river.
