= Grenadian Creole English =

English-based creole and main language of Grenada

- patois
- Native to: Grenada
- Native speakers: (89,000 cited 2001)
- Language family: English Creole: Atlantic; Eastern; Southern; Grenadian Creole English

Language codes
- ISO 639-3: gcl
- Glottolog: gren1247
- Linguasphere: 52-ABB-as

Grenadian Creole English is a Creole language spoken in Grenada. It is a member of the Southern branch of English-based Eastern Atlantic Creoles, along with Antiguan Creole (Antigua and Barbuda), Bajan Creole (Barbados), Guyanese Creole (Guyana), Tobagonian Creole, Trinidadian Creole (Trinidad and Tobago), Vincentian Creole (Saint Vincent and the Grenadines), and Virgin Islands Creole (Virgin Islands). It is the common vernacular and the native language of nearly all inhabitants of Grenada, or approximately 89,000 native speakers in 2001.

== History ==
Great Britain took control of Grenada from France in the 18th century, and ruled until its independence in 1974. Despite the long history of British rule, Grenada's French heritage is still evidenced by the number of French loanwords in Grenadian Creole English, as well as by the lingering existence of Grenadian Creole French in the country. The Francophone character of Grenada is the result of over a century of uninterrupted French rule before the British conquest, which eventually led to Grenadian Creole English replacing Grenadian Creole French as the lingua franca of the island in the 20th century.

The Grenada Creole Society, founded in 2009, implemented the mission to research and document the language in Grenada. The initial findings were published in 2012 in the publication Double Voicing and Multiplex Identities ed. Nicholas Faraclas et al.

== Linguistic features ==
The syntactic structures of Grenadian Creole English is influenced by Standard English, Grenadian Creole French, Standard French and some African languages. Some words are taken from Hindi-Urdu.

== See also ==
- Bermudian English
- Jamaican Patois
