= Colombia–Grenada relations =

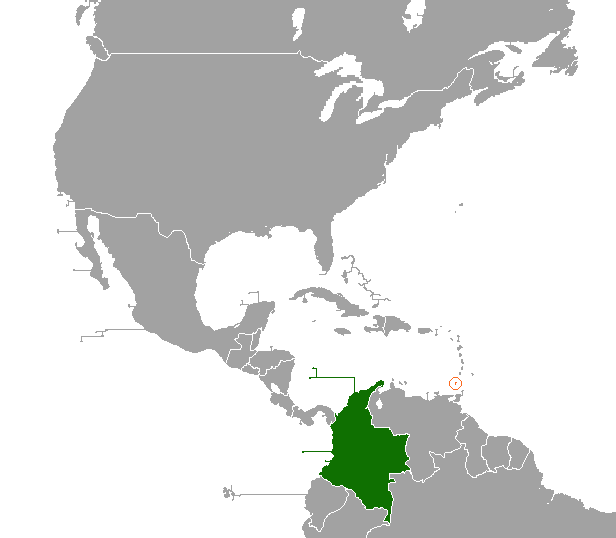

- Colombia: Grenada

Diplomatic mission
- Embassy of Colombia in Port of Spain: Embassy of Grenada in Caracas

Colombia–Grenada relations are diplomatic relations between the Republic of Colombia and Grenada. Both governments maintain a friendly relationship. Both countries are members of Organization of American States and the Community of Latin American and Caribbean States.

== History ==
Both governments established diplomatic relations on 9 January 1981. With the exception of the Bahamas, Suriname, and Haiti, Colombia and the CARICOM countries (including Grenada) signed the Partial Scope Agreement on Trade and Economic and Technical Cooperation (AAP No. 31) in 1994. In February 2022, Colombian vice minister of foreign affairs Francisco Echeverri held a bilateral meeting with permanent secretary of the ministry of foreign affairs of Grenada Roxie Hutchinson about establishing a political consultation mechanism.

== Economic relations ==
Colombia exported products worth 300 thousand dollars, the main products being those related to light industry, agro-industry and sugar, while Colombia exported products worth 12 thousand dollars, being footwear and clothing.

In 2022, Colombia exported $869k to Grenada. The products exported from Colombia to Grenada were Raw Sugar ($237k), Baked Goods ($74.2k), and Fishing Ships ($66k). Grenada exported $124k to Colombia. The products exported from Grenada to Colombia included Toilet Paper ($123k) and Aldehydes ($1.08k).

== Diplomatic representation ==
Neither country has a resident ambassador.

- Colombia uses its embassy in Port of Spain as a concurrent embassy to Grenada.
- Grenada uses its embassy in Caracas as a concurrent embassy to Colombia.

== See also ==
- Foreign relations of Colombia
- Foreign relations of Grenada
