= Visa policy of Grenada =

Policy on permits required to enter Grenada

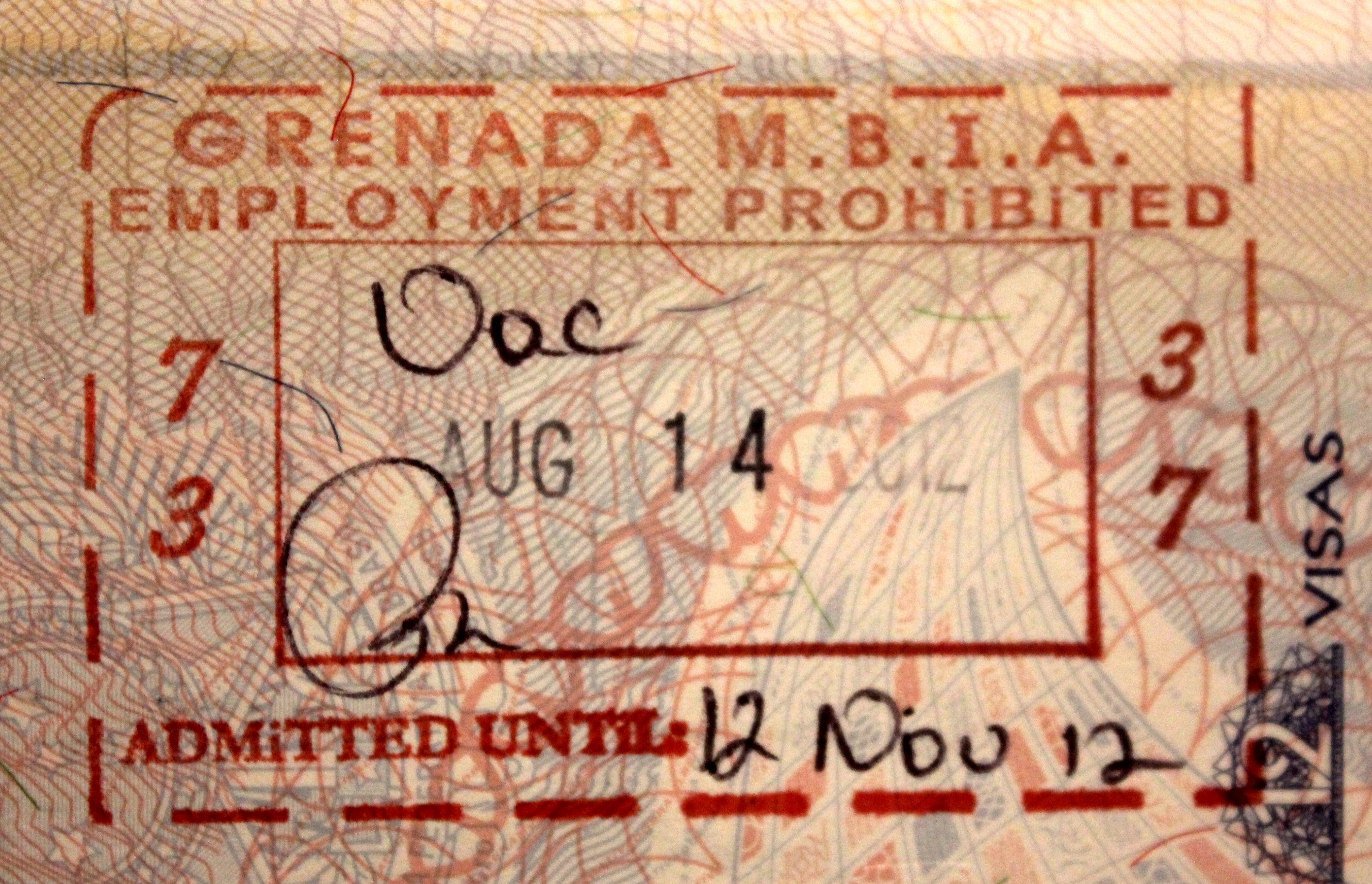
Entry stamp

Visitors to Grenada must obtain a visa from one of the Grenadian diplomatic missions or in certain cases in United Kingdom diplomatic missions unless they are citizens from one of the visa-exempt countries or countries whose citizens are eligible for visa issuance at the port of entry.

== Visa policy map ==
Visa policy of Grenada Grenada Freedom of movement Visa not required (3 months) Visa not required (60 days) Visa not required (30 days) Visa on arrival Visa required

== Visa exemption ==
Holders of passports of the following countries and territories may enter Grenada without a visa for the following period:

Freedom of movement

- Antigua and Barbuda
- Dominica
- Saint Kitts and Nevis
- Saint Lucia
- Saint Vincent and the Grenadines

3 months

- All European Union member states

- Australia
- Bahamas
- Bangladesh
- Barbados
- Belize
- Benin
- Botswana
- Brazil
- Brunei
- Cameroon
- Canada^{1}
- Chile
- Costa Rica
- Dominican Republic
- Ecuador
- El Salvador
- Eswatini
- Gambia
- Georgia
- Ghana
- Guyana
- Haiti
- Hong Kong
- Iceland
- India
- Israel
- Jamaica
- Japan
- Kenya
- Kiribati
- Lesotho
- Liechtenstein
- Macau
- Malawi
- Malaysia
- Maldives
- Mauritius
- Mexico
- Micronesia
- Monaco
- Morocco
- Mozambique
- Namibia
- Nauru
- New Zealand
- Nicaragua
- Norway
- Palau
- Papua New Guinea
- Peru
- Russia
- Rwanda
- Samoa
- San Marino
- Serbia
- Seychelles
- Sierra Leone
- Singapore
- Solomon Islands
- South Africa
- South Korea
- Sri Lanka
- Suriname
- Switzerland
- Tanzania
- Tonga
- Trinidad and Tobago
- Tuvalu
- Uganda
- Ukraine
- United Arab Emirates
- United Kingdom^{1}
- United States^{1}
- Uruguay
- Vanuatu
- Vatican City
- Venezuela
- Zambia

60 days

- Cuba

30 days

- Argentina
- China

_{1 - Citizens of Canada, United Kingdom and the United States are exempt from holding a passport and may enter on a declaration while using a proof of citizenship bearing a photograph and one photo ID. When departing from the United States, however, a passport is required per the regulations of U.S. Department of Homeland Security.}

Extension of stay may be obtained at the Immigration Authorities Office in Grenada.

Cruise ship passengers from all countries and territories may enter Grenada without a visa for up to 24 hours.

== Visa on arrival ==
Holders of passports of the following countries may obtain a visa on arrival:

- Azerbaijan
- Belarus
- Bosnia and Herzegovina
- Egypt
- Kazakhstan
- Kyrgyzstan
- Moldova
- Montenegro
- North Macedonia
- Tajikistan
- Turkmenistan
- Uzbekistan

== See also ==
- Visa requirements for Grenadian citizens
