= Visa requirements for Grenadian citizens =

Grenadian visa requirements

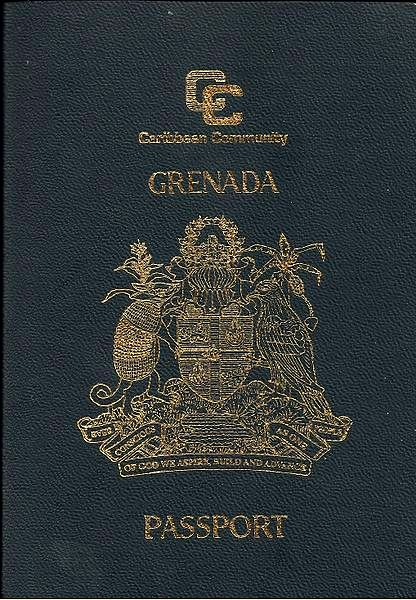
Grenadian passport

Visa requirements for Grenadian citizens are administrative entry restrictions imposed by the authorities of foreign states on citizens of Grenada. As of 2026 Grenadian citizens had visa-free or visa on arrival access to 147 countries and territories, ranking the Grenadian passport 25th in the world in terms of travel freedom (tied with Mauritius and Panama) according to the Henley Passport Index.

Grenada signed a mutual visa waiver agreement with the European Union on 28 May 2015.

As of 26 June 2024, Brunei, Grenada, Mauritius, Peru, and the Seychelles are the only countries whose citizens may travel without a visa to China, Russia, the Schengen Area, and the United Kingdom.

== Visa requirement map ==
Visa requirements for Grenadian citizens Grenada Freedom of movement Visa-free Visa available both on arrival or online Visa on arrival eVisa Visa required

== Visa requirements ==
Visa requirements for holders of normal passports travelling for tourist purposes:

Country	Visa requirement	Allowed stay	Notes (excluding departure fees)
Afghanistan	eVisa	30 days	Visa is not required in case born in Afghanistan or can proof that one of their parents is a national of Afghanistan or born in Afghanistan.; e-Visa : Visitors must arrive at Kabul International (KBL).
Albania	Visa required		Visa not required for a max. stay of 90 days for holders of a valid multiple entry visa issued by the US, UK or Schengen.
Algeria	Visa required		
Andorra	Visa not required		
Angola	Visa not required	90 days	Maximum 3 entries per calendar year
Antigua and Barbuda	Freedom of movement	Freedom of movement for OECS states; ID card valid	
Argentina	Visa not required	90 days	
Armenia	eVisa/Visa on arrival	120 days	Obtainable on arrival at Zvartnots International Airport or prior to travel online.
Australia and territories	Visa required		May apply online (Online Visitor e600 visa).
Austria	Visa not required	90 days	3 months during a 6 months period following the date of first entry in the Schengen Area;
Azerbaijan	Visa required		Visa not required for a max. stay of 30 days for holders of a valid residence permit issued by a GCC Member State.
Bahamas	Visa not required	3 months	
Bahrain	eVisa		
Bangladesh	Visa not required	90 days	
Barbados	Visa not required	180 days	Holders of Caricom Certificate of Skills can stay indefinitely.
Belarus	Visa required		Visas are issued on arrival at the Minsk International Airport if the support documents were submitted not later than 3 business days before expected date of arrival.
Belgium	Visa not required	90 days	3 months during a 6 months period following the date of first entry in the Schengen Area;
Belize	Visa not required	180 days	Holders of Caricom Certificate of Skills can stay indefinitely.
Benin	Visa not required	90 days	3 months during a 6 months period.
Bhutan	eVisa		Visa fee is USD 40 per person and visa application may be processed within 5 business days with duration of stay of 90 days.; e-Visa applicant is also subject to pay Sustainable Development Fee
Bolivia	Visa on arrival	90 days	
Bosnia and Herzegovina	Visa not required	90 days	
Botswana	Visa not required	90 days	90 days within any year period
Brazil	Visa not required	90 days	90 days within any 180 day period
Brunei	Visa required		
Bulgaria	Visa not required	90 days	3 months during a 6 months period following the date of first entry in the Schengen Area;
Burkina Faso	eVisa		
Burundi	Visa on arrival		Must hold an Entry Authorisation letter issued by the authorities of Burundi beforehand.
Cambodia	eVisa/Visa on arrival	30 days	Visa is also obtainable online.
Cameroon	eVisa		
Canada	Visa required		
Cape Verde	Visa on arrival		Not available at all entry points.
Central African Republic	Visa required		
Chad	Visa required		
Chile	Visa not required	90 days	
China	Visa not required	30 days	
Colombia	Visa not required	180 days	90 days - extendable up to 180-days stay within a one-year period
Comoros	Visa on arrival		
Republic of the Congo	Visa required		
Democratic Republic of the Congo	eVisa		
Costa Rica	Visa not required	90 days	
Côte d'Ivoire	Visa required	3 months	e-Visa holders must arrive via Port Bouet Airport.
Croatia	Visa not required	90 days	3 months during a 6 months period following the date of first entry in the Schengen Area;
Cuba	Visa not required	60 days	
Cyprus	Visa not required	90 days	90 days within any 180 day period
Czech Republic	Visa not required	90 days	3 months during a 6 months period following the date of first entry in the Schengen Area;
Denmark	Visa not required	90 days	3 months during a 6 months period following the date of first entry in the Schengen Area;
Djibouti	eVisa	31 days	
Dominica	Freedom of movement	Freedom of movement for OECS states; ID card valid	
Dominican Republic	Visa not required		
Ecuador	Visa not required	90 days	
Egypt	Visa on arrival	30 days	
El Salvador	Visa required		Visa not required for Holders of a valid visa issued by Canada, the USA or a Schengen Member State.
Equatorial Guinea	eVisa		
Eritrea	Visa required		
Estonia	Visa not required	90 days	3 months during a 6 months period following the date of first entry in the Schengen Area;
Eswatini	Visa not required	30 days	
Ethiopia	eVisa	up to 90 days	eVisa holders must arrive via Addis Ababa Bole International Airport
Fiji	Visa not required	4 months	
Finland	Visa not required	90 days	3 months during a 6 months period following the date of first entry in the Schengen Area;
France	Visa not required	90 days	3 months during a 6 months period following the date of first entry in the Schengen Area;
Gabon	e-Visa		Electronic visa holders must arrive via Libreville International Airport.
Gambia	Visa not required	90 days	
Georgia	eVisa		Visa waiver agreement signed on 23 November 2020 and it is yet to come into force.
Germany	Visa not required	90 days	3 months during a 6 months period following the date of first entry in the Schengen Area;
Ghana	Visa not required	30 days	
Greece	Visa not required	90 days	3 months during a 6 months period following the date of first entry in the Schengen Area;
Guatemala	Visa required		Visa not required for a max. stay of 90 days for holders of a valid visa issued by Canada, the USA or a Schengen Member.
Guinea	eVisa		
Guinea-Bissau	Visa on arrival	90 days	
Guyana	Visa not required	6 months	Holders of Caricom Certificate of Skills can stay indefinitely.
Haiti	Visa not required	3 months	
Honduras	Visa required		Visa not required for holders of a valid multiple entry visa issued by Canada, USA or a Schengen Member State
Hungary	Visa not required	90 days	3 months during a 6 months period following the date of first entry in the Schengen Area;
Iceland	Visa not required	90 days	3 months during a 6 months period following the date of first entry in the Schengen Area;
India	e-Visa	60 days	e-Visa holders must arrive via 32 designated airports (Note: Ahmedabad; Amritsar; Bagdogra; Bengaluru; Bhubaneswar; Chandigarh; Chennai; Coimbatore; Delhi; Gaya; Goa-Dabolim; Goa-Manohar; Guwahati; Hyderabad; Indore; Jaipur; Kannur; Kochi; Kolkata; Kozhikode; Lucknow; Madurai; Mangaluru; Mumbai; Nagpur; Port Blair; Pune; Surat; Thiruvananthapuram; Tiruchirappalli; Varanasi; Visakhapatnam) or 5 designated seaports. (Note: Chennai; Cochin; Mormugao (Goa); Mumbai; Mangalore); An Indian e-Tourist Visa may only be obtained twice within 1 calendar year.; Foreigners of Pakistani origin or who hold a Pakistani Passport are not eligible for an e-Visa. Foreigners who are not Pakistani nationals, but whose parents or grandparents (either paternal or maternal) were born in, or were permanent residents in Pakistan, are also not eligible for an e-Visa.
Indonesia	Visa required		
Iran	eVisa/Visa on arrival	30 days	
Iraq	eVisa	30 days	
Ireland	Visa not required	90 days	
Israel	Electronic Travel Authorization	3 months	
Italy	Visa not required	90 days	3 months during a 6 months period following the date of first entry in the Schengen Area;
Jamaica	Visa not required	180 days	Holders of Caricom Certificate of Skills can stay indefinitely.
Japan	Visa required		
Jordan	eVisa/Visa on arrival		Conditions apply.; Not available at all entry points.
Kazakhstan	Visa required		
Kenya	Electronic Travel Authorisation	3 months	
Kiribati	Visa not required	30 days	
North Korea	Visa required		
South Korea	K-ETA	90 days	Grenadian citizens can enter South Korea as a short term visit (e.g., tours, visiting relatives or friends, attending simple meetings) up to 90 days without a visa. You must also have an onward or return ticket. It is illegal to work on a tourist visa, whether as a teacher or in any other capacity.; You must be in possession of a Korea Electronic Travel Authorization (K-ETA) to enter Korea visa-free. You can complete your K-ETA application up to 24 hours before boarding your flight and it will be valid for two years from the date of approval. There is a small, non-refundable charge.
Kuwait	Visa required		
Kyrgyzstan	eVisa		Electronic visa holders must arrive via Manas International Airport or Osh Airport or through land crossings with China (at Irkeshtam and Torugart), Kazakhstan (at Ak-jol, Ak-Tilek, Chaldybar, Chon-Kapka), Tajikistan (at Bor-Dobo, Kulundu, Kyzyl-Bel) and Uzbekistan (at Dostuk).
Laos	eVisa / Visa on arrival	30 days	18 (Note: Savannakhet Airport; Lanetoui - Mengkang (China); Meuangmom - Wan Pong (Myanmar); Banvang - Ban Khok Phai (Thailand); Namngeun - Huay Kon (Thailand); Paksan - Bueng Kan (Thailand); Paktaphan - Pak Saeng (Thailand); Pangmon - Ban Huak (Thailand); Phoudou (Thailand); Dak ta ock - Nam Giang (Vietnam); La Lai (Vietnam); Namkan (Vietnam); Namphao - Cau Treo (Vietnam); Namsoy - Na Meo (Vietnam); Naphao - Cha Lo (Vietnam); Pahang - Long Sap (Vietnam); Panghok - Tây Trang (Vietnam); Phoukeua - Bo Y (Vietnam)) of the 33 border crossings are only open to regular visa holders.; e-Visa may be used to enter Laos through the Luang Prabang, Pakse and Vientiane international airports, 3 Thai-Lao Friendship Bridges (Note: Vientiane (Friendship Bridge 1); Savannakhet (Friendship Bridge 2); Bokeo (Friendship Bridge 4)), in Boten (road and railroad), and in Vientiane (at Khamsavath railway station).; Visa on arrival is available at the Luang Prabang, Pakse and Vientiane international airports, 4 Thai-Lao Friendship Bridges (Note: Vientiane (Friendship Bridge 1); Savannakhet (Friendship Bridge 2); Khammouane (Friendship Bridge 3); Bokeo (Friendship Bridge 4)) and 7 border crossings. (Note: Nongnokkheane - Trapeang Kriel (Cambodia); Boten - Bo han (China); Golden Triangle/Samliemkham (Thailand); Khamsavath railway station (Thailand); Namheuang - Ban Na Kraseng (Thailand); Vang tao - Chongmek (Thailand); Dansavan - Lao Bảo (Vietnam))
Latvia	Visa not required	90 days	3 months during a 6 months period following the date of first entry in the Schengen Area;
Lebanon	Visa required		
Lesotho	Visa not required	90 days	
Liberia	e-VOA		
Libya	eVisa	30 days	
Liechtenstein	Visa not required	90 days	3 months during a 6 months period following the date of first entry in the Schengen Area;
Lithuania	Visa not required	90 days	3 months during a 6 months period following the date of first entry in the Schengen Area;
Luxembourg	Visa not required	90 days	3 months during a 6 months period following the date of first entry in the Schengen Area;
Madagascar	eVisa / Visa on arrival	90 days	
Malawi	Visa not required	90 days	
Malaysia	Visa not required	1 month	
Maldives	Visa not required	30 days	
Mali	Visa required		
Malta	Visa not required	90 days	3 months during a 6 months period following the date of first entry in the Schengen Area;
Marshall Islands	Visa required		
Mauritania	eVisa	30 days	Available at Nouakchott–Oumtounsy International Airport.
Mauritius	Visa not required	90 days	
Mexico	Visa required		Visa not required for a max. stay of 180 days for holders of a valid visa issued by Canada, Japan, USA, UK or a Schengen Member State.; Visa not required for a max. stay of 180 days for holders of a valid Permanent Residence visa issued by Peru, Colombia or Chile.
Micronesia	Visa not required	30 days	
Moldova	Visa not required	90 days	90 days within any 180 day period
Monaco	Visa not required		
Mongolia	Visa required		
Montenegro	Visa not required	90 days	
Morocco	eVisa	30 days	Single entry eVisa valid for 6 months is obtainable for a max. stay of 30 days for holders of a valid visa or resident permit issued by Australia, Canada, Ireland, Japan, New Zealand, the UK, the USA or a Schengen Member.
Mozambique	eVisa/Visa on arrival	30 days	Conditions apply
Myanmar	Visa required		
Namibia	Visa required		
Nauru	Visa required		
Nepal	eVisa/Visa on arrival	90 days	
Netherlands	Visa not required	90 days	3 months during a 6 months period following the date of first entry in the Schengen Area;
New Zealand	Visa required		Holders of an Australian Permanent Resident Visa or Resident Return Visa may be granted a New Zealand Resident Visa on arrival permitting indefinite stay (pursuant to the Trans-Tasman Travel Arrangement), subject to meeting character requirements and obtaining an Electronic Travel Authority prior to departure.
Nicaragua	Visa on arrival	90 days	
Niger	Visa required		
Nigeria	eVisa	90 days	
North Macedonia	Visa required		Visa not required for a max. stay of 15 days for holders of a valid multiple entry visa issued by Canada, US or UK
Norway	Visa not required	90 days	3 months during a 6 months period following the date of first entry in the Schengen Area;
Oman	Visa required		
Pakistan	Online Visa		
Palau	Visa on arrival	30 days	
Panama	Visa not required	3 months	
Papua New Guinea	Easy Visitor Permit	30 days	
Paraguay	Visa required		
Peru	Visa not required	up to 183 days	
Philippines	Visa not required	30 days	
Poland	Visa not required	90 days	3 months during a 6 months period following the date of first entry in the Schengen Area;
Portugal	Visa not required	90 days	3 months during a 6 months period following the date of first entry in the Schengen Area;
Qatar	eVisa		
Romania	Visa not required	90 days	3 months during a 6 months period following the date of first entry in the Schengen Area;
Russia	Visa not required	90 days	90 days within any 180 day period
Rwanda	Visa not required	30 days	
Saint Kitts and Nevis	Freedom of movement	Freedom of movement for OECS states; ID card valid	
Saint Lucia	Freedom of movement	Freedom of movement for OECS states; ID card valid	
Saint Vincent and the Grenadines	Freedom of movement	Freedom of movement for OECS states; ID card valid	
Samoa	Entry Permit on arrival	60 days	
San Marino	Visa not required		
São Tomé and Príncipe	eVisa		
Saudi Arabia	eVisa		
Senegal	Visa on arrival	90 days	
Serbia	Visa not required	90 days	90 days within any 180 day period
Seychelles	Visitor's Permit on arrival	3 months	
Sierra Leone	Visa on arrival		
Singapore	Visa not required	30 days	
Slovakia	Visa not required	90 days	3 months during a 6 months period following the date of first entry in the Schengen Area;
Slovenia	Visa not required	90 days	3 months during a 6 months period following the date of first entry in the Schengen Area;
Solomon Islands	Visitor's permit on arrival	3 months	
Somalia	eVisa	30 days	All visitors must have an approved Electronic Visa (eTAS) before the start of their journey.
South Africa	Visa required		
South Sudan	eVisa		Obtainable online; Printed visa authorization must be presented at the time of travel
Spain	Visa not required	90 days	3 months during a 6 months period following the date of first entry in the Schengen Area;
Sri Lanka	ETA / Visa on arrival	30 days	
Sudan	Visa required		
Suriname	Visa not required	180 days	Holders of Caricom Certificate of Skills can stay indefinitely.
Sweden	Visa not required	90 days	3 months during a 6 months period following the date of first entry in the Schengen Area;
Switzerland	Visa not required	90 days	3 months during a 6 months period following the date of first entry in the Schengen Area;
Syria	eVisa		
Tajikistan	eVisa	45 days	
Tanzania	Visa not required	90 days	
Thailand	eVisa		
Timor-Leste	Visa on arrival	30 days	Not available at all entry points.
Togo	eVisa	15 days	
Tonga	Visa required		
Trinidad and Tobago	Visa not required	180 days	Holders of Caricom Certificate of Skills can stay indefinitely.
Tunisia	Visa required		
Turkey	eVisa	90 days	
Turkmenistan	Visa required		
Tuvalu	Visa on arrival	1 month	
Uganda	Visa not required	3 months	
Ukraine	Visa not required	90 days	90 days within any 180 day period
United Arab Emirates	Visa required	30 days	30 day entry visit visa and valid for 6 months from the date of issue for a stay of 90 days.
United Kingdom	Electronic Travel Authorisation	6 months	Up to 90 days if arriving from Ireland (Common Travel Area); An ETA is required to travel to the United Kingdom, including Northern Ireland.
United States	Visa required		
Uruguay	Visa not required	90 days	
Uzbekistan	Visa not required	30 days	
Vanuatu	Visa not required	30 days	
Vatican City	Visa not required		
Venezuela	Visa not required	90 days	Extensions possible.
Vietnam	eVisa	90 days	Phú Quốc without a visa for up to 30 days.
Yemen	Visa required		
Zambia	Visa not required	90 days	90 days as tourists or 30 days for business
Zimbabwe	Visa not required	3 months	

=== Dependent, disputed, or restricted territories ===
Unrecognized or partially recognized countries

Territory	Conditions of access	Notes
Abkhazia	Visa required	
Northern Cyprus	Visa not required	
Kosovo	Visa not required	90 days
Palestine	Visa not required	Arrival by sea to Gaza Strip not allowed.
Sahrawi Arab Democratic Republic		Undefined visa regime in the Western Sahara controlled territory.
Somaliland	Visa on arrival	30 days for 30 US dollars, payable on arrival.
South Ossetia	Visa not required	Multiple entry visa to Russia and three day prior notification are required to enter South Ossetia.
Taiwan	Visa required	
Transnistria	Visa not required	Registration required after 24h.

Dependent and autonomous territories

Territory	Conditions of access	Notes
China
Hong Kong	Visa not required	90 days
Macau	Visa not required	90 days
Denmark
Faroe Islands	Visa not required	90 days
Greenland	Visa not required	90 days
France
French Guiana	Visa not required	90 days within 180 days
French Polynesia	Visa not required	90 days within 180 days
French West Indies	Visa not required	Visa free for overseas departments of Guadeloupe, Martinique, Saint Barthélemy and Saint Martin (90 days)
Mayotte	Visa not required	90 days within 180 days
New Caledonia	Visa not required	90 days within 180 days
Réunion	Visa not required	90 days within 180 days
Saint Pierre and Miquelon	Visa not required	90 days within 180 days
Wallis and Futuna	Visa not required	90 days within 180 days
Netherlands
Aruba	Visa not required	90 days
Caribbean Netherlands	Visa not required	90 days. Includes Bonaire, Sint Eustatius and Saba.
Curaçao	Visa not required	3 months
Sint Maarten	Visa not required	90 days
New Zealand
Cook Islands	Visa not required	31 days
Niue	Visa not required	30 days
Tokelau	Visa required	
United Kingdom
Akrotiri and Dhekelia	Visa not required	Stays longer than 28 days per 12-month period require a permit.
Anguilla	Visa not required	3 months
Bermuda	Visa not required	Up to 6 months, decided on arrival.
British Indian Ocean Territory	Special permit required	Special permit required.
British Virgin Islands	Visa not required	6 months
Cayman Islands	Visa not required	6 months
Falkland Islands	Visa required	
Gibraltar	Visa not required	6 months
Guernsey	Visa not required	6 months
Isle of Man	Visa not required	6 months
Jersey	Visa not required	6 months
Montserrat	Visa not required	6 months
Pitcairn Islands	Visa not required	14 days visa free and landing fee US$35 or tax of US$5 if not going ashore.
Ascension Island	eVisa	3 months within any year period
Saint Helena	eVisa	Up to 183 days, decided on arrival.
Tristan da Cunha	Permission required	Permission to land required for 15/30 pounds sterling (yacht/ship passenger) for Tristan da Cunha Island or 20 pounds sterling for Gough Island, Inaccessible Island or Nightingale Islands.
South Georgia and the South Sandwich Islands	Permit required	Pre-arrival permit from the Commissioner required (72 hours/1 month for 110/160 pounds sterling).
Turks and Caicos Islands	Visa not required	90 days
United States
American Samoa	Visa required	
Guam	Visa required	
Northern Mariana Islands	Visa required	
Puerto Rico	Visa required	
U.S. Virgin Islands	Visa required	
Antarctica and adjacent islands
Special permits required for Bouvet Island, British Antarctic Territory, French Southern and Antarctic Lands, Argentine Antarctica, (Australia) Australian Antarctic Territory, (Antártica Chilena Province) Chilean Antarctic Territory, (Australia) Heard Island and McDonald Islands, (Norway) Peter I Island, (Norway) Queen Maud Land, (New Zealand) Ross Dependency.

Other territories

Territory	Conditions of access	Notes
Belarus; Belovezhskaya Pushcha National Park	Visa not required	3 days; must first obtain an electronic pass
China; Hainan	Visa not required	30 days
China; Tibet Autonomous Region	TTP required	Tibet Travel Permit required (10 US Dollars).
(Autonomous Republic of Crimea) Crimea	Visa not required	90 days
Ecuador; Galápagos	Pre-registration required	Online pre-registration is required. Transit Control Card must also be obtained at the airport prior to departure.
Eritrea outside Asmara	Travel permit required	To travel in the rest of the country, a Travel Permit for Foreigners is required (20 Eritrean nakfa).
Greece; Mount Athos	Special permit required	Special permit required (4 days: 25 euro for Orthodox visitors, 35 euro for non-Orthodox visitors, 18 euro for students). There is a visitors' quota: maximum 100 Orthodox and 10 non-Orthodox per day and women are not allowed.
India PAP/RAP	PAP/RAP required	Protected Area Permit (PAP) required for whole states of Nagaland and Sikkim and parts of states Manipur, Arunachal Pradesh, Uttaranchal, Jammu and Kashmir, Rajasthan, Himachal Pradesh. Restricted Area Permit (RAP) required for all of Andaman and Nicobar Islands and parts of Sikkim. Some of these requirements are occasionally lifted for a year.
Iran; Kish Island	Visa not required	Visitors to Kish Island do not require a visa.
Iraqi Kurdistan	Visa on arrival	Visa on arrival for 15 days is available at Erbil and Sulaymaniyah airports.
Fiji; Lau Province	Special permission required	Special permission required.
France; Clipperton Island	Special permit required	Special permit required.
Kazakhstan	Special permission required	Special permission required for the town of Baikonur and surrounding areas in Kyzylorda Oblast, and the town of Gvardeyskiy near Almaty.
North Korea outside Pyongyang	Special permit required	People are not allowed to leave the capital city, tourists can only leave the capital with a governmental tourist guide (no independent moving)
Malaysia Sabah and Sarawak	Visa not required	These states have their own immigration authorities and passport is required to travel to them, however the same visa applies.
Maldives outside Malé	Permission required	With the exception of the capital Malé, tourists are generally prohibited from visiting non-resort islands without the express permission of the Government of Maldives.
Norway; Jan Mayen	Permit required	Permit issued by the local police required for staying for less than 24 hours and permit issued by the Norwegian police for staying for more than 24 hours.
Novorossiya	Restricted area	Crossing from Ukraine requires visit purpose to be explained to Ukrainian passport control on exit and those who entered from Russia are not allowed to proceed further into Ukraine.
Russia	Special authorization required	Several closed cities and regions in Russia require special authorization.
Sudan outside Khartoum	Travel permit required	All foreigners traveling more than 25 kilometers outside of Khartoum must obtain a travel permit.
Sudan; Darfur	Travel permit required	Separate travel permit is required.
Tajikistan; Gorno-Badakhshan Autonomous Province	OIVR permit required	OIVR permit required (15+5 Tajikistani Somoni) and another special permit (free of charge) is required for Lake Sarez.
(United Nations) UN Buffer Zone in Cyprus	Access Permit required	Access Permit is required for travelling inside the zone, except Civil Use Areas.
(United Nations) Korean Demilitarized Zone	Restricted zone.	
(United Nations) UNDOF Zone and Ghajar	Restricted zone.	
United States Minor Outlying Islands	Special permits required	Special permits required for Baker Island, Howland Island, Jarvis Island, Johnston Atoll, Kingman Reef, Midway Atoll, Palmyra Atoll and Wake Island.
Venezuela; Margarita Island	Visa not required	All visitors are fingerprinted.
Vietnam; Phú Quốc	Visa not required	30 days
Yemen outside Sanaa or Aden	Special permission required	Special permission needed for travel outside Sanaa or Aden.

== Additional Rules ==
=== Visa exemption for Schengen States ===
Grenadian citizens are classified as 'Annex II' foreign nationals, and so are permitted to stay visa-free in the 26 member states of the Schengen Area as a whole — rather than each country individually — for a period not exceeding 3 months every 6 months.

=== Visa exemption in CARICOM States ===
Grenadian citizens wishing to live and work in another CARICOM State should obtain a CSME Skills Certificate. This must be presented at Immigration in the receiving country along with a valid passport and a police certificate of character. Holders of certificates are given a maximum of six (6) months stay in the host country until their status and documents could be verified. Additional documents are required if travelling with spouse and/or dependants such as Marriage certificate, Birth Certificate, etc.

=== Visa exemption in OECS States ===
Grenadian citizens can live and work in Antigua and Barbuda, Dominica, Saint Lucia, Saint Kitts and Nevis and Saint Vincent and the Grenadines as a result of right of freedom of movement granted in Article 12 of the Protocol of the Eastern Caribbean Economic Union of the Revised Treaty of Basseterre.

=== Visa exemption and requirements for the United Kingdom ===
Grenadian citizens are able to visit the United Kingdom for up to 6 months (or 3 months if they enter from Ireland) without the need to apply for a visa as long as they fulfil all of the following criteria:

- they do not work during their stay in the UK
- they must not register a marriage or register a civil partnership during their stay in the UK
- they can present evidence of sufficient money to fund their stay in the UK (if requested by the border inspection officer)
- they intend to leave the UK at the end of their visit and can meet the cost of the return/onward journey
- they have completed a landing card and submitted it at passport control unless in direct transit to a destination outside the Common Travel Area
- if under the age of 18, they can demonstrate evidence of suitable care arrangements and parental (or guardian's) consent for their stay in the UK

However, even though, strictly speaking, he/she is not required to apply for a visa if he/she satisfies all of the above criteria, a Grenadian citizen who falls into any of the following categories has been strongly advised by the UK Border Agency (replaced by UK Visas and Immigration) to apply for a visa prior to travelling to the UK:

- he/she has any unspent criminal convictions in any country
- he/she has previously been refused or breached the terms of any entry to the UK, or been deported or otherwise removed from the UK
- he/she has previously applied for a visa and been refused one
- he/she has been warned by a UK official that he/she should obtain a visa before travelling to the UK

Grenadian citizens with a grandparent born either in the United Kingdom, Channel Islands or Isle of Man at any time or in Ireland on or before 31 March 1922 can apply for UK Ancestry Entry Clearance, which enables them to work in the UK for 5 years, after which they can apply to settle indefinitely.

== Remote work visas ==
Grenadian citizens can apply for a resident permit on the basis of a remote worker from the following countries:

Country	Duration	Cost	Basic conditions
Anguilla (UK Overseas Territory)	Up to 1 year	USD2,000 for one person and USD3,000 for a family of 4 (plus an additional $250 USD for each additional family member)	Proof of employment or Business Incorporation Certificate.; Police Certificate of Character.; Medical insurance required.
Bahamas	Up to 1 year	$1,000 USD (plus $500 USD for each dependent)	Proof of employment.; Police Certificate of Character.; Medical insurance required.; $25 USD application fee
Bermuda (British Overseas Territory)	Up to 1 year	USD263	Must be working remotely for a company outside of Bermuda.; No minimum income required.; Must undergo for a mandatory COVID test.; Show proof of travel insurance.
Cayman Islands (British Overseas Territory)	Up to 2 years	USD1,469	Must be working remotely for a company outside of the Cayman Islands.; No minimum income required.; Must undergo for a mandatory COVID test.; Show proof of travel insurance.
Costa Rica	1 year	TBC	Must be working remotely for a company outside of Costa Rica.; Earn a minimum of USD3,000 a month.; Show proof of travel insurance.
Curaçao (Dutch Overseas Territory)	6 months, extendable.	USD294	Employed by a company registered in a foreign country, Business Incorporation Certificate or Freelancer or consulting services to clients with contracts in foreign countries.; Proof of solvency.; Show proof of travel insurance.
Mauritius	12 months	Free of charge.	Must be working remotely for a company outside of Mauritius.; Proof of income.; Must undergo for a mandatory COVID test.; Health insurance with Mauritius coverage validity
Mexico	Up to 3 years		Must be working remotely for a company outside of Mexico.; Earn a minimum of EUR$1,742.54 a month or a bank statement proving funds of EUR$29,042.47.; Health insurance with Mexico coverage validity
United Arab Emirates	1 year	USD287	Proof of Employment from current employer with a one-year contract, or proof of ownership of company.; Earn a minimum of USD5,000 a month, last months’ payslip and 3 preceding months’ bank statements.; Health insurance with UAE coverage validity.

== Consular protection of Grenadian citizens abroad ==
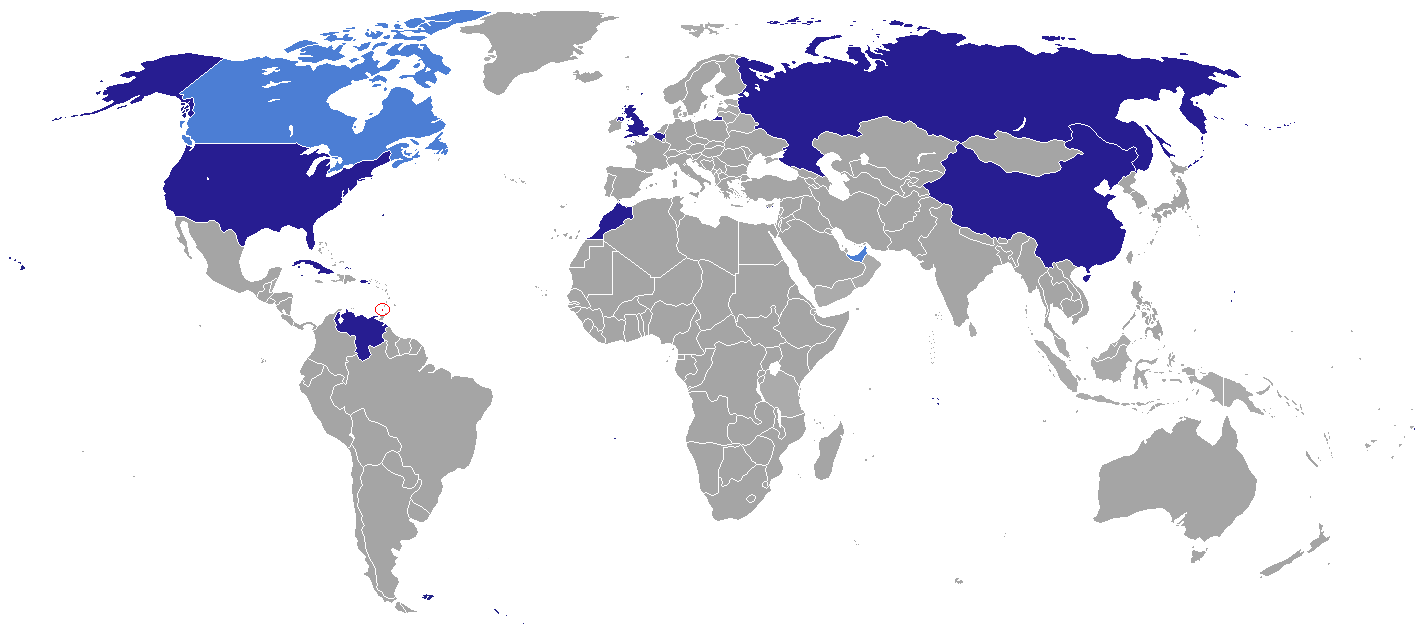
Diplomatic missions of Grenada

Grenadian citizens who require consular assistance in a foreign country where there is no Grenadian foreign mission may be able to request assistance from a British Embassy, high commission or consulate. For example, Grenadians who need to travel urgently and whose passport has expired, been lost or stolen can be issued with an emergency travel document by a British foreign mission as long as this has cleared with the Grenadian Ministry of Foreign Affairs. See List of diplomatic missions of Grenada.

== See also ==
- Visa policy of Grenada
- Grenadian passport
