= Indo-Grenadians =

Grenadians who trace their roots to the Republic of India

Total population
- 12,000

Regions with significant populations
- St. George’s

Languages
- English, Grenadian Creole English, Grenadian Creole French, Hindustani

Religion
- Hinduism, Roman Catholicism, Protestantism, Islam

Related ethnic groups
- Non-resident Indian and Person of Indian Origin, Indo-Caribbeans, Desi

Indo-Grenadians or Grenadians, who trace their roots to India, form the largest minority group in Grenada. This term is not generally recognized by Grenadians or indeed Caribbeans. They usually refer to themselves simply as Grenadian or possibly Caribbean. This group was first introduced during the second half of the 19th century when Grenada experimented with indentured labour. By the second half of the 20th century Indians were so integrated into Grenada’s society that a distinct Indian cultural identity was generally invisible. In addition, Indians were involved in every aspect of Grenadian life. Currently there are over 12,000 Grenadians of Indian and mixed-Indian descent (11% of the total population).

== History ==
Historian S. N. Yadav described the history of Indo-Grenadians as "essentially the history of a relatively powerless ethnic group submitting without any organised resistance to an environment unfavourable to it in almost every sense". Historian Raymond D. Viechweg wrote in 2007, "the beginning of the trade in Indian indentures ... meant the continuous intermixing, or creolizing, of cultures that would eventually place the Grenadian Indian in a position of cultural vulnerability. When Indians arrived in Grenada in 1857, they found themselves in a position subordinate to a dominant Anglo-African creolization. In Grenada, Indians have functioned within and alongside the dominant Afro-Grenadian cultural formation for 150 years now." Following the abolition of slavery in 1833 and the full emancipation of African slaves in Grenada in 1838, plantation owners in the region sought to find alternate sources of labour. Grenadian planters initially made unsuccessful attempts to replace African slave labour with indentured workers from Africa, Malta and Portugal.

Planters in the West Indies began using indentured workers from British India as labour on their plantations. Learning of the success of the approach, planters in Grenada also sought to hire Indian indentured workers. British Grenada legalised immigration in 1856 to facilitate the arrival indentured migrant workers. The first ship carrying indentured workers from India, the Maidstone, departed from Calcutta on 27 January 1857 with 375 Indians on board. It arrived at Irwin’s Bay in St. Patrick Parish, Grenada on 1 May 1857. Eighty-six Indians died during the voyage. Most of the workers on the Maidstone were distributed to plantation estates in St. Patrick and St. Mark parishes, as well as other parishes. None were sent to plantations in St. John parish. The Fulwood brought 362 live Indian workers to Grenada in 1858 and the Jalawar brought 249 workers the following year. Between 1857 and 1878, ships transported a total of 3,033 Indians to Grenada, excluding those who died during the voyage. The last ship carrying 175 indentured Indian labourers arrived on the island some time between 1881 and 1885. In total, nearly 3,206 Indians were brought to Grenada, excluding those who died during the voyage. Only about 15% of them returned to India, while the rest remained in the country even after their indenture period ended in 1890. These Indians are the origin of the Indo-Grenadian community.

The 100th anniversary of the first arrival of Indians in Grenada was commemorated in 1957. This was the first ever commemoration of the day in Grenada. The next commemoration would occur more than five decades later in 2009. The International Conference on The Indian Diaspora in Grenada and the Wider Caribbean was held from 29 April to 1 May 2009 to commemorate the event, as well as to discuss Indo-Caribbean history. The conference was by the Indo-Caribbean Cultural Centre Co. Ltd, the Indian Cultural Organisation (Grenada) Inc., and the Indo-Grenadian Heritage Foundation (IHF) with support from Belmont Estate Group of Companies, and the High Commission of India in Trinidad and Tobago. It was officially inaugurated by Prime Minister Keith Mitchell.

On 29 April 2009, the Government of Grenada declared that 1 May would officially be designated as Indian Arrival Day and observed annually alongside the existing Labour Day. The date was already a public holiday in Grenada, on account of Labour Day. The Government also announced that Boucherie Road, the road leading to the site of the arrival of the Maidstone, would be officially renamed Maidstone Road to honour the arrival of Indians in Grenada. The renaming was officially carried out in a ceremony at 10:30 AM at La Fortune Junction, St. Patrick on 2 May 2009. Governor General Sir Carlyle Glean unveiled a granite plaque commemorating the arrival of the first Indians in Grenada. The plaque bears the inscription, "On 1st May 1857, in this bay the sailing vessel “Maidstone” anchored and landed 287 passengers having left India three months earlier, with 304 passengers. Between the years 1857 and 1890 other ships anchored in this and other bays bringing a total of 3,200 persons from India to work as agricultural indenture labourers in Grenada. This monument is dedicated to those who became the genesis of the Indo-Grenadian population of our nation".

== See also ==
- Grenada–India relations
- Demographics of Grenada
- Hinduism in Grenada
- Indian subcontinent
- Indo-Caribbean
- Indian Diaspora
