= Grenadian passport =

Passport issued to citizens of Grenada

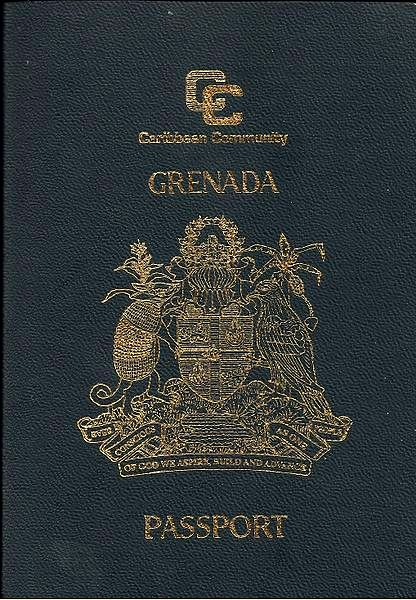
- Front cover of a Grenadian CARICOM biometric passport
- Type: Passport
- Issued by: Grenada
- First issued: 4 August 2006 (CARICOM series); 17 July 2018 (biometric e-passport)
- Purpose: Identification and international travel
- Eligibility: Grenadian citizenship
- Expiration: 10 years (adults), 5 years (minors)

The Grenadian passport is an official travel document issued to citizens of Grenada for the purpose of international travel. It serves as proof of identity and nationality, and facilitates access to consular assistance abroad.

Grenada issues biometric CARICOM passports to its citizens, in line with regional standards for member states of the Caribbean Community. The passport is issued by the Immigration and Passport Department under the Royal Grenada Police Force, and follows the provisions of the Grenadian Citizenship Act of 1976 and the Passports Act (Cap. 226).

== History ==
Following independence in 1974, Grenada began issuing national passports. In August 2006, Grenada adopted the CARICOM passport format. In July 2018, the country introduced biometric passports featuring enhanced security elements. These e-passports contain an embedded microchip and comply with ICAO standards.

On 1 July 2024, the validity period for adult passports was extended from five to ten years. This change was accompanied by a fee adjustment and aligned Grenada with international norms.

== Types of passports ==
Grenada issues several types of passports. The regular passport is issued to all eligible Grenadian citizens for ordinary travel purposes. The official or service passport is issued to government employees traveling on official duty. The diplomatic passport is issued to diplomats, high-ranking government officials, and their eligible dependents. An emergency travel document is issued to citizens requiring urgent return to Grenada, typically when a passport is lost or stolen.

== Application ==
All Grenadian citizens are eligible to apply for a passport. Applicants under the age of 16 require parental or guardian consent. Passports are issued by the Immigration and Passport Department in Grenada, or through overseas missions in coordination with local authorities.

=== Requirements ===
Applicants must provide proof of citizenship, a completed application form, recent passport photographs, and applicable fees. Lost, stolen, or damaged passports require a police report and affidavit.

=== Fees ===
As of July 2024, the standard fee is EC$350 for a 10-year adult passport. A 5-year child passport costs EC$250. Replacement of lost, stolen, or damaged passports is subject to a higher fee of EC$700. Emergency travel documents are available at a cost of US$35 or local equivalent.

== Physical appearance ==
Grenadian passports follow the CARICOM format and are navy blue. The front cover displays the CARICOM insignia, the name "GRENADA," the national coat of arms, and the type of passport such as "PASSPORT" or "OFFICIAL PASSPORT."

The document contains 36 pages and measures 88 mm by 125 mm (B7 format). Since 2018, passports include biometric features and a polycarbonate data page with embedded security elements, including a digitally printed photograph and microchip.

=== Biodata page ===
The passport's identification page includes the passport type and country code (P, GRD), passport number, surname and given names, nationality, date and place of birth, sex, date of issue and expiry, issuing authority, holder's photograph and signature, and a machine-readable zone (MRZ).

== Passport message ==
A statement on the inside cover reads:

"These are to request and require in the name of the Governor-General of Grenada all those whom it may concern to allow the bearer to pass freely without let or hindrance and to afford such assistance and protection as may be necessary."

== Visa requirements ==
As of 2025, Grenadian passport holders have visa-free or visa-on-arrival access to 147 countries and territories, ranking the passport 28th globally according to the Henley Passport Index. Grenadian citizens benefit from visa-free access to the Schengen Area, United Kingdom, China, and Russia.

Grenada has bilateral agreements and multilateral arrangements with organizations such as the European Union and Organisation of Eastern Caribbean States (OECS), allowing freedom of movement, particularly within the OECS region.

== See also ==
- Visa requirements for Grenadian citizens
- Grenadian nationality law
- CARICOM passport
- Organisation of Eastern Caribbean States
- Foreign relations of Grenada
