= Grenada–United Kingdom relations =

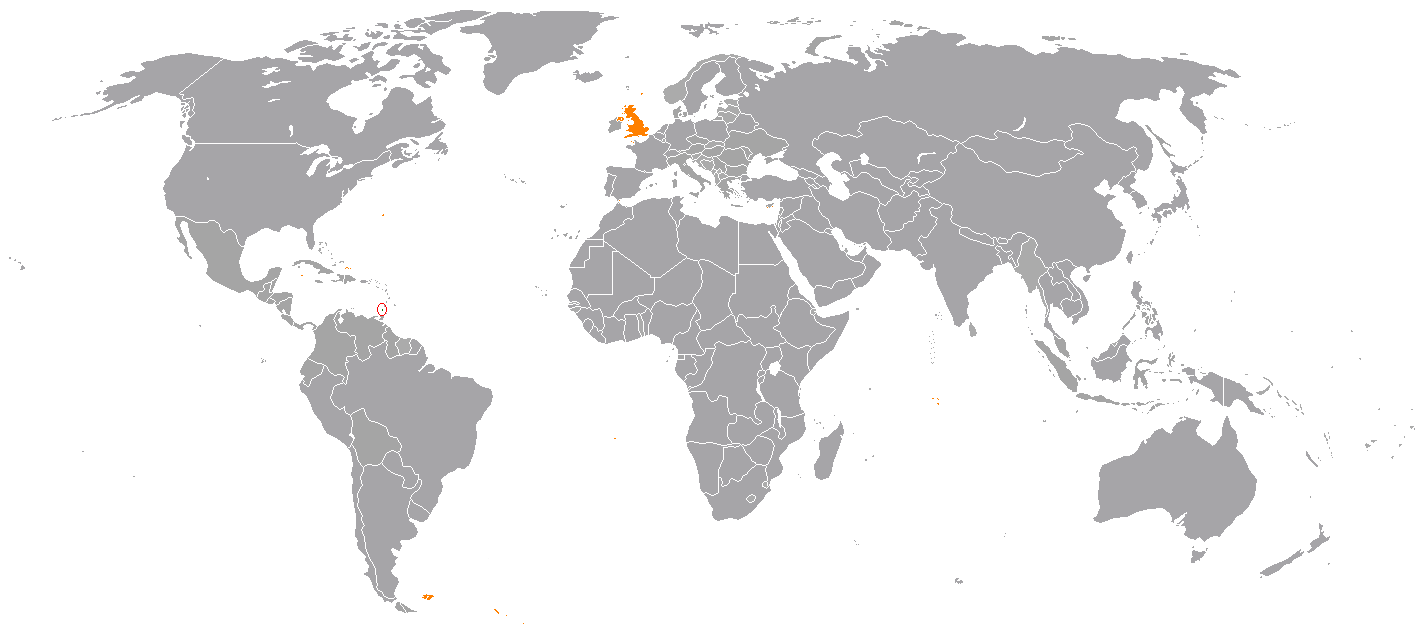

- Grenada: United Kingdom

Grenada–United Kingdom relations are the international bilateral relations between Grenada and the United Kingdom. The UK governed Grenada from 1762 to 1974, when Grenada achieved full independence.

Both countries share common membership of the Caribbean Development Bank, the Commonwealth, the International Criminal Court, the United Nations, and the World Trade Organization, as well as the CARIFORUM–UK Economic Partnership Agreement.

== Today ==
As Commonwealth realms, the two countries share a monarch, King Charles III, and both are active members of the United Nations, the Commonwealth of Nations, the Commonwealth Parliamentary Association and the African, Caribbean and Pacific–EU's Joint Parliamentary Assembly.

== Migration ==
=== To Grenada ===
A poll conducted by the British Broadcasting Corporation (BBC) found that there were roughly 2,500 persons identified as British citizens living abroad in Grenada.

=== To the United Kingdom ===
In the 2001 UK Census showed over 9,783 Grenadian born people residing in the United Kingdom.

== Diplomacy ==
On January 20, 2012, Grenada held the 7th UK-Caribbean Forum at the Grenadian By Rex Resort. The main agenda of this meeting was establishing priority areas for cooperation, discussing key areas of concern and proposing mechanisms to facilitate greater collaboration. The United Kingdom's Foreign Secretary, the Hon. William Hague attend to the meeting.

=== Diplomatic Missions ===
- Grenada maintains a high commission in London.
- The United Kingdom is accredited to Grenada through its high commission in Saint George's.

=== Bilateral agreements ===
Date	Agreement name	Law ref. number	Note
2007 & 2011	Air Traffic Services Agreement		It was reviewed in 2011

== See also ==
- Foreign relations of Grenada
- Foreign relations of the United Kingdom
- List of high commissioners of Grenada to the United Kingdom
