= List of diplomatic missions in Grenada =

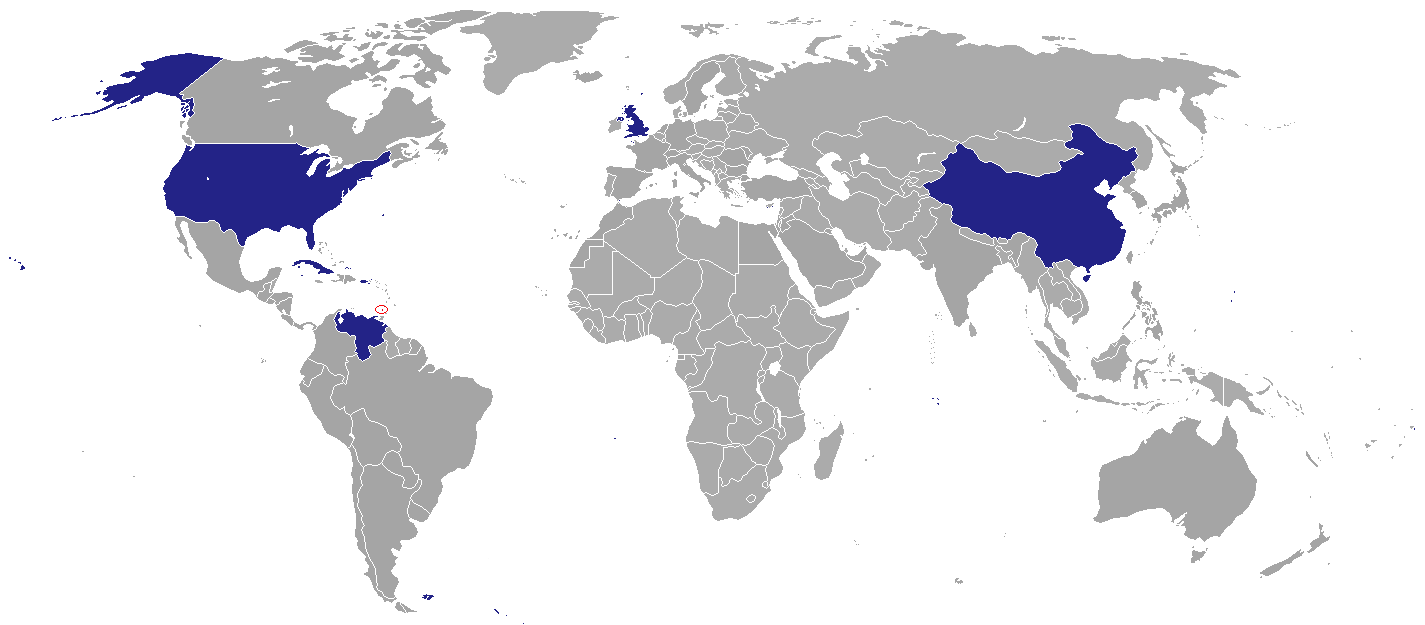
Diplomatic missions in Grenada

This article lists the diplomatic missions in Grenada. At present, the capital St. George’s hosts 5 embassies/high commissions. Several other countries are accredited through their embassies in other countries.

== Embassies/High Commissions ==
Saint George's

1. China
2. Cuba
3. United Kingdom
4. United States
5. Venezuela

== Non-resident embassies and High Commissions ==
- Argentina (Port-of-Spain)
- Australia (Port-of-Spain)
- Austria (Havana)
- Belgium (Kingston)
- Brazil (Port-of-Spain)
- Canada (Bridgetown)
- Chile (Port-of-Spain)
- Colombia (Port-of-Spain)
- Cyprus (Havana)
- Denmark (Mexico City)
- El Salvador (Port-of-Spain)
- France (Castries)
- Germany (Port-of-Spain)
- Greece (Caracas)
- Guatemala (New York City)
- Iceland (New York City)
- India (Port-of-Spain)
- Indonesia (Caracas)
- Ireland (Havana)
- Italy (Caracas)
- Israel (Santo Domingo)
- Japan (Port-of-Spain)
- Libya (Castries)
- Malaysia (Caracas)
- Mexico (Castries)
- Netherlands (Port-of-Spain)
- New Zealand (Bridgetown)
- Poland (Caracas)
- Russia (Georgetown)
- Saudi Arabia (Caracas)
- Serbia (Havana)
- Seychelles (New York City)
- Singapore (Caracas)
- South Korea (Port-of-Spain)
- Switzerland (Caracas)
- Slovakia (Havana)
- South Africa (Kingston)
- Spain (Port-of-Spain)
- Thailand (Ottawa)
- Turkey (Port-of-Spain)
- United Arab Emirates (New York City)
- Vietnam (Caracas)

== Closed missions ==
Host city	Sending country	Mission	Year closed	Ref.
St. George’s	Grenada	Embassy Branch Office	2026	

== See also ==
- Foreign relations of Grenada
- List of diplomatic missions of Grenada
