= Grenada–Soviet Union relations =

- Grenada: Soviet Union

Grenada–Soviet Union relations refers to the relations between Grenada, and the Soviet Union. Diplomatic relations between Grenada and the Soviet Union were severed in November 1983 by the Governor General of Grenada. Eventually in 2002, Grenada re-established diplomatic relations with the newly formed Russian Federation.

== History of relations ==
During the New Jewel Movement, the Soviet Union tried to make the island of Grenada to function as a Soviet base, and also by getting supplies from Cuba. In October 1983, during the U.S. invasion of Grenada, U.S. President Ronald Reagan maintained that US Marines arrived on the island of Grenada, which was considered a Soviet-Cuban ally that would export communist revolution throughout the Caribbean. In November, at a joint hearing of Congressional Subcommittee, it was told that Grenada could be used as a staging area for subversion of the nearby countries, for intersection of shipping lanes, and for the transit of troops and supplies from Cuba to Africa, and from Eastern Europe and Libya to Central America. In December, the State Department published a preliminary report on Grenada, in which was claimed as an "Island of Soviet Internationalism". When the US Marines landed on the island, they discovered a large amount of documents, which included agreements between the Soviet Government, and the New Jewel Movement, recorded minutes of the Committee meetings, and reports from the Grenadian embassy in Moscow.

== See also ==
- Foreign relations of Grenada
- Foreign relations of the Soviet Union
