= Grenadian nationality law =

Grenadian Citizenship Act

Parliament of Grenada
- Long title: An Act relating to Grenadian citizenship
- Enacted by: Government of Grenada
- Status: Current legislation

Grenadian nationality law is regulated by the 1973 Grenadian Constitution, as amended; the Citizenship Act of 1976, and its revisions; and various British Nationality laws. These laws determine who is, or is eligible to be, a national of Grenada. Grenadian nationality is typically obtained either on the principle of jus soli, i.e. by birth in Grenada; or under the rules of jus sanguinis, i.e. by birth abroad to parents with Grenadian nationality. It can also be granted to persons with an affiliation to the country, or to a permanent resident who has lived in the country for a given period of time through naturalisation. There is also, currently a program in Grenada for persons to acquire nationality through investment in the country. Nationality establishes one's international identity as a member of a sovereign nation. Though it is not synonymous with citizenship, for rights granted under domestic law for domestic purposes, the United Kingdom, and thus the Commonwealth, have traditionally used the words interchangeably.

Grenada was previously an associated state of the United Kingdom and local residents were British subjects. Over time, the colony was granted more autonomy and gradually became independent from the United Kingdom. Although Grenadian citizens are no longer British, they continue to hold favoured status when residing in the UK; as Commonwealth citizens, Grenadians are eligible to vote in UK elections and serve in public office there.

== Acquiring Grenadian nationality ==
Grenadian nationality is acquired through birth, registration, or naturalisation.

=== By birth ===
- Persons who are born within the territory, except if the parent has diplomatic immunity or is a national of a country at war with Grenada;
- Persons who are born abroad to at least one parent who was born in Grenada;
- Persons born upon aircraft or ships registered in Grenada or unregistered aircraft or ships belonging to the government; or
- Foundlings.

=== By registration ===
Nationality by registration includes those who have familial or historic relationship affiliations with Grenada. It also includes a scheme to acquire nationality through investment. Persons who acquire nationality by registration include:

==== By affiliation ====
- Persons who were the spouse or widow/er of a national who acquired nationality at the time of independence, or would have acquired nationality except for the death of the spouse;
- Minor persons, who register by their eighteenth birthday, who were born to a Grenadian parent, or a parent who would have acquired such nationality at independence had the parent not died prior to independence;
- Post-independence, the spouse of a national;
- Persons who are nationals of a Commonwealth country, or the Republic of Ireland, who have become residents of Grenada and resided in the territory or worked for the government for at least five years;
- Minors under age eighteen who are legally adopted are eligible for registration upon issuance of an adoption order.

==== By investment ====
Requirements for acquiring nationality by investment in Grenada require a minimum of one year permanent residency in Grenada. The primary applicant must be 18 years of age or older and up to four family members (parents, grandparents, siblings, spouse, or children) must make a minimum investment, which in 2020 was US$150,000 for a single applicant and US$200,000 for a family of four persons, to the National Transformation Fund. Other investments for approved projects or investments in economic projects which will create jobs have other monetary requirements. Agents of the Citizenship by Investment Unit are responsible for processing applications. Applicants must pay non-refundable due diligence fees for background checks and provide other documentation, such as medical reports, identity documents, and a police report, as required.

=== By naturalisation ===
Ordinary naturalisation in Grenada can be obtained by adult persons of legal capacity, who in the 12 months prior to submitting an application resided in the territory, are of good character, and intend to be a resident of Grenada. Applicants petition the Minister responsible for immigration, who considers whether the applicant has adequate knowledge of the English language; and has resided within the territory for seven years (the last two of which must be as a permanent resident), worked for the government, or has combined residency and government service for seven years. The application must be accompanied by appropriate documents to verify identity and confirm that the applicant is not a threat to the security or public order of Grenada. Upon approval, applicants who are not nationals of Commonwealth countries must take an Oath of Allegiance. Grenada allows a special naturalisation process for people who are political refugees or stateless, at the discretion of the Minister.

== Loss of nationality ==
Nationals may voluntarily renounce their affiliation with Grenada, if the declarant is a legal adult and is able to acquire other nationality, eliminating the prospect of statelessness within twelve months. Renunciation may not be accepted if Grenada is in a war with the proposed new source of nationality. Denaturalisation may occur if a person obtained nationality through fraud, false representation, or concealment; if they have committed acts of treason; if they have committed acts of disloyalty or service to a foreign government; if they are found guilt of certain criminal offences; and in the case of nationality by investment for failure to meet requirements of the program.

== Dual nationality ==
Dual nationality has been permissible since independence.

== History ==
=== Spanish and French colonial period (1498–1763 and 1783) ===
Grenada was encountered by Spain in 1498, however no attempts were made to inhabit it by them because of the warlike nature of the indigenous Kalinago, or Carib, people living there. A colonization attempt was made by British merchants in 1609, but failed because of altercations with the native population. In 1626, the Compagnie de Saint-Christophe was chartered by Louis XIII's chief minister, Cardinal Richelieu to colonize the Lesser Antilles. In 1627 a royal patent was issued by Charles I of England to James Hay, 1st Earl of Carlisle granting rights over the islands situated between 10° and 20° north latitude, creating a competing claim for Grenada. In 1650, Jacques Dyel du Parquet purchased land from the Caribs and established a permanent French settlement. Du Parquet sold his interest in Grenada to Jean de Faudoas, Comte de Sérillac, in 1657, who in turn sold the island to the French West India Company in 1664. The Proprietary period ended in 1674, when Grenada was annexed as a crown colony of France. The French established cotton and tobacco farming and also cultivated indigo on plantations of the island.

Indigo became the staple crop until around 1702, when sugar cultivation was introduced along with the typical slavocracy that accompanied the growth of sugar in the Caribbean. Slavery in the French colonies was regulated by the Code Noir. At the conclusion of the Seven Years' War in 1763, Grenada was ceded to Britain under the terms of the Treaty of Paris. The colony of the Southern Caribbee Islands, which included Grenada, Dominica, St. Vincent, and Tobago, established a Colonial Council 1764. Grenada and Tobago were split off as a separate colony in 1776. During the American Revolutionary War, France retook the territory in 1779. Grenada remained in French hands until the 1783 Treaty of Paris returned it to Britain in 1783. The failed Fédon's rebellion of 1795 to 1796 was the last attempt to reestablish French authority in Grenada.

=== British colony (1763 and 1783–1974) ===
In Britain, allegiance, in which subjects pledged to support a monarch, was the precursor to the modern concept of nationality. The crown recognised from 1350 that all persons born within the territories of the British Empire were subjects. Those born outside the realm — except children of those serving in an official post abroad, children of the monarch, and children born on a British sailing vessel — were considered by common law to be foreigners. Marriage did not affect the status of a subject of the realm. Unlike other colonial powers with slave societies in the Caribbean, the British did not have a single overarching slave code. Each British colony was allowed to establish its own rules about the slave trade, and a new code was established for Grenada in 1766. At the conclusion of the American Revolution, Grenada's legislators took steps to attract white settlers and diminish the threat posed by French inhabitants and free people of colour, who were also overwhelmingly aligned with the French population. The small white population controlled all of the economic and socio-political institutions of the island until 1833, but between 1823 and 1830, whites made up less than 20% of the free population. By 1824, two-thirds of the businesses in St. George's were owned by free men of colour, who had no access to political power, no access to civil service positions, nor any right to participate as a juror. Married women were subjugated to the authority of their husbands under coverture, and the law was structured to maintain social hierarchies by regulating familial matters like, who could marry, legitimacy, and inheritance. Children in slave societies followed the status of the mother, thus if she was free her children would be free or if she was in bondage, her children would also be bound.

Other than common law, there was no standard statutory law which applied for subjects throughout the realm, meaning different jurisdictions created their own legislation for local conditions, which often conflicted with the laws in other jurisdictions in the empire. (Note: In their efforts to increase the white population in Grenada, the legislature imposed restrictions on the ratio of black and white persons living on each plantation. In 1790, recognising that social conditions would not allow white labourers to work for freedmen, the legislature exempted free coloured men from paying the deficiency tax for faulty proportions, if they had adult male children living with them on their estate. This was the only situation in which a free coloured person was afforded an advantage under the laws of Grenada. There were few similar legal instances in the British West Indies where mixed-race people received advantageous treatment. In 1822, the Grenadian legislature passed a law to repeal the exemption, which was overturned in 1824 by the British Parliament, restoring the exemption.) Nationality laws passed by the British Parliament were extended only to the Kingdom of Great Britain, and later the United Kingdom of Great Britain and Ireland. In 1807, the British Parliament passed the Slave Trade Act, barring the Atlantic slave trade in the empire. The Act did not abolish slavery, which did not end until the 1833 Emancipation Act went into effect in 1834. Under its terms, slaves were converted into apprentices and remained bound to their former owners for four years if they had worked in the home and for six years if they had been field labourers. Because of administrative problems and a lack of evidence that the apprentice program was preparing former slaves for freedom, Britain ended all apprenticeships effective on 1 August 1838. Though free, there was never a British plan to give former slaves a voice in Parliament, leaving them as British subjects in a highly stratified system of rights. Denied political and economic rights, former slaves were not entitled to formal recognition as nationals by other nations.

In 1833, Grenada was included in the confederation of the British Windward Islands, along with Barbados, St. Vincent, and Tobago, under the authority of a single governor, but with individual legislatures. In 1875 the local legislature in Grenada disbanded, which resulted in the island becoming a crown colony in 1877, transferring responsibility for island affairs to Britain. In 1911, at the Imperial Conference a decision was made to draft a common nationality code for use across the empire. The British Nationality and Status of Aliens Act 1914 allowed local jurisdictions in the self-governing Dominions to continue regulating nationality in their territories, but also established an imperial nationality scheme throughout the realm. The uniform law, which went into effect on 1 January 1915, required a married woman to derive her nationality from her spouse, meaning if he was British, she was also, and if he was foreign, so was she. It stipulated that upon loss of nationality of a husband, a wife could declare that she wished to remain British and provided that if a marriage had terminated, through death or divorce, a British-born national who had lost her status through marriage could reacquire British nationality through naturalisation without meeting a residency requirement. The statute reiterated common law provisions for natural-born persons born within the realm on or after the effective date. By using the word person, the statute nullified legitimacy requirements for jus soli nationals. For those born abroad on or after the effective date, legitimacy was still required, and could only be derived by a child from a British father (one generation), who was natural-born or naturalised. Naturalisations required five years residence or service to the crown.

Amendments were enacted in 1918, 1922, 1933 and 1943 changing derivative nationality by descent and modifying slightly provisions for women to lose their nationality upon marriage. Because of a rise in statelessness, a woman who did not automatically acquire her husband's nationality upon marriage or upon his naturalisation in another country, did not lose their British status after 1933. The 1943 revision allowed a child born abroad at any time to be a British national by descent if the Secretary of State agreed to register the birth. Under the terms of the British Nationality Act 1948 British nationals in Grenada were reclassified at that time as "Citizens of the UK and Colonies" (CUKC). The basic British nationality scheme did not change overmuch, and typically those who were previously defined as British remained the same. Changes included that wives and children no longer automatically acquired the status of the husband or father, children who acquired nationality by descent no longer were required to make a retention declaration, and registrations for children born abroad were extended.

In 1958, Grenada joined the West Indies Federation. The federation, which included Barbados, the British Leeward Islands, the British Windward Islands, Jamaica, and Trinidad and Tobago, was typically seen by its supporters as a means to use a federal structure to gain national independence and eventual recognition as a Dominion. The federation was unable to develop a unified nationality scheme, as member states tended to identify with their specific island, rather than by region. The federation collapsed in 1962, but in 1967, Grenada became an Associated State, under the West Indies Act of that year. The terms of the Act provided that Associated States – Antigua, Dominica, Grenada, Saint Christopher-Nevis-Anguilla, Saint Lucia and Saint Vincent – were on a trajectory to become fully independent and each could terminate their association upon becoming an independent Commonwealth country.

=== Post-independence (1974–present) ===
On 7 February 1974, Grenada withdrew from the Associated States and became fully independent. Generally, persons who had previously been nationals as defined under the classification of "Citizens of the UK and Colonies", would become nationals of Grenada on Independence Day and cease to be British nationals. Exceptions were made for persons to retain their British nationality and status if they (or their father or grandfather) were born, naturalised, or registered in a part of the realm which remained on 1 November part of the United Kingdom or colonies, or had been annexed by such a place. Other exceptions included that wives did not cease to be CUKCs, unless their husband did. Subsequently, Grenada passed the Citizenship Act of 1974, which was later replaced by the Citizenship Act of 1976. The 1976 Citizenship Act was revised in 1977, 1980, 1984, 1991, 1996, 1998, 1999, 2000, 2010, and 2012.

== See also ==
- Grenada
- Grenadian passport
- Monarchy in Grenada
- British nationality law
- Commonwealth realm
- Commonwealth of Nations
- Caricom
- OECS
