= Foreign relations of Grenada =

The United States, Venezuela, Cuba, and the People's Republic of China have embassies in Grenada. It maintains diplomatic missions in the United Kingdom, the United States, Venezuela, and Canada.

Grenada is a member of the Caribbean Development Bank, CARICOM, the Organization of Eastern Caribbean States (OECS), and the Commonwealth of Nations. It joined the United Nations in 1974, and the World Bank, the International Monetary Fund, and the Organization of American States in 1975. Grenada also is a member of the Eastern Caribbean's Regional Security System (RSS).

In December 2014, Grenada joined Bolivarian Alliance for the Peoples of Our America (ALBA) as a full member. Prime minister Mitchell said that the membership was a natural extension of the co-operation Grenada have had over the years with both Cuba and Venezuela.

== Diplomatic relations ==
List of countries which Grenada maintains diplomatic relations with:

| # | Country | Date |
|---|---|---|
| 1 | Antigua and Barbuda | Unknown |
| 2 | Belgium | Unknown |
| 3 | Dominica | Unknown |
| 4 | Haiti | Unknown |
| 5 | Saint Vincent and the Grenadines | Unknown |
| 6 | Canada | 7 February 1974 |
| 7 | United Kingdom | 7 February 1974 |
| 8 | France | February 1974 |
| 9 | Barbados | 3 March 1974 |
| 10 | Argentina | 18 June 1974 |
| 11 | South Korea | 1 August 1974 |
| 12 | Panama | 18 November 1974 |
| 13 | United States | 29 November 1974 |
| 14 | Jamaica | 21 January 1975 |
| 15 | Israel | January 1975 |
| 16 | Sweden | 15 February 1975 |
| 17 | Romania | 3 April 1975 |
| 18 | Japan | 11 April 1975 |
| 19 | Mexico | 11 April 1975 |
| 20 | Turkey | 8 May 1975 |
| 21 | Chile | 20 May 1975 |
| 22 | India | 1 October 1975 |
| 23 | United Arab Emirates | 1975 |
| 24 | Brazil | 19 July 1976 |
| 25 | Spain | 2 September 1976 |
| 26 | Portugal | 8 September 1976 |
| 27 | Egypt | 14 September 1976 |
| 28 | Bahamas | 1976 |
| 29 | Italy | 19 January 1977 |
| 30 | Trinidad and Tobago | 17 February 1977 |
| 31 | Venezuela | 16 April 1977 |
| 32 | Thailand | 16 May 1977 |
| 33 | Hungary | 30 July 1977 |
| 34 | Serbia | 29 June 1978 |
| 35 | Austria | 3 November 1978 |
| — | Holy See | 17 February 1979 |
| 36 | Suriname | 1 March 1979 |
| 37 | Cuba | 14 April 1979 |
| 38 | Ecuador | June 1979 |
| 39 | Nigeria | June 1979 |
| 40 | Vietnam | 11 July 1979 |
| 41 | Russia | 7 September 1979 |
| 42 | Zambia | 7 September 1979 |
| 43 | Ethiopia | 17 September 1979 |
| 44 | Algeria | 18 September 1979 |
| 45 | Nicaragua | 29 September 1979 |
| 46 | Germany | 9 October 1979 |
| 47 | São Tomé and Príncipe | 23 November 1979 |
| 48 | Czech Republic | 28 November 1979 |
| 49 | Australia | 18 December 1979 |
| 50 | Netherlands | 1979 |
| 51 | Syria | 23 January 1980 |
| 52 | Guyana | February 1980 |
| 53 | Laos | 4 March 1980 |
| 54 | Seychelles | 22 April 1980 |
| 55 | Cyprus | 29 April 1980 |
| 56 | Finland | 1 June 1980 |
| 57 | Poland | 2 June 1980 |
| 58 | Bulgaria | 9 June 1980 |
| 59 | Colombia | 9 January 1981 |
| 60 | Mongolia | 25 July 1981 |
| 61 | Mozambique | 27 July 1981 |
| 62 | Guinea | 4 December 1981 |
| 63 | Guinea-Bissau | 4 December 1981 |
| 64 | Switzerland | 1981 |
| 65 | Iraq | 24 January 1982 |
| 66 | Greece | 20 July 1982 |
| 67 | Saint Lucia | 6 October 1982 |
| 68 | Iceland | 14 January 1983 |
| 69 | Afghanistan | 11 March 1983 |
| 70 | Angola | 13 March 1983 |
| 71 | Peru | 16 March 1983 |
| 72 | Bolivia | 5 August 1983 |
| 73 | Iran | August 1983 |
| 74 | Republic of the Congo | 1 September 1983 |
| 75 | Saint Kitts and Nevis | 19 September 1983 |
| 76 | Belize | 21 September 1983 |
| 77 | Uruguay | 20 September 1985 |
| 78 | China | 1 October 1985 |
| 79 | North Korea | 20 September 1991 |
| 80 | Indonesia | 28 February 1992 |
| 81 | Guatemala | 16 July 1992 |
| 82 | Costa Rica | 31 August 1992 |
| 83 | El Salvador | 17 December 1992 |
| 84 | South Africa | 5 March 1998 |
| 85 | Slovakia | 23 February 1999 |
| 86 | Norway | 26 April 2000 |
| 87 | Croatia | 19 May 2000 |
| 88 | Belarus | 31 May 2000 |
| 89 | Maldives | 13 July 2000 |
| 90 | Libya | 24 July 2000 |
| 91 | Singapore | 15 December 2000 |
| 92 | Qatar | 28 April 2002 |
| 93 | Estonia | 12 May 2006 |
| 94 | Luxembourg | 1 March 2007 |
| 95 | Brunei | 29 January 2009 |
| 96 | Malaysia | 3 February 2009 |
| 97 | Azerbaijan | 23 September 2010 |
| 98 | Slovenia | 4 May 2011 |
| 99 | Malta | 26 May 2011 |
| 100 | Morocco | 27 May 2011 |
| 101 | Georgia | 23 November 2011 |
| 102 | Armenia | 3 April 2012 |
| 103 | Latvia | 19 September 2012 |
| 104 | Kazakhstan | 15 November 2012 |
| 105 | Sri Lanka | 19 December 2012 |
| 106 | Kuwait | 17 May 2013 |
| — | State of Palestine | 27 September 2013 |
| 107 | New Zealand | September 2013 |
| 108 | Honduras | 6 June 2013 |
| — | Kosovo | 25 September 2013 |
| 109 | Lithuania | 26 September 2013 |
| 110 | Montenegro | 17 March 2014 |
| 111 | Solomon Islands | 2 April 2014 |
| 112 | Fiji | 23 June 2015 |
| — | Sovereign Military Order of Malta | 12 November 2015 |
| 113 | Paraguay | 21 September 2016 |
| 114 | Tajikistan | 13 October 2017 |
| 115 | Denmark | 6 November 2018 |
| 116 | Kyrgyzstan | 30 May 2019 |
| 117 | Uzbekistan | 11 October 2019 |
| 118 | Moldova | 26 June 2019 |
| 119 | Ukraine | 26 September 2019 |
| 120 | Turkmenistan | 13 February 2020 |
| 121 | Bosnia and Herzegovina | 6 October 2020 |
| 122 | Monaco | 14 October 2020 |
| 123 | Sierra Leone | 24 February 2021 |
| 124 | Rwanda | 3 March 2021 |
| 125 | Dominican Republic | 23 September 2021 |
| 126 | Bahrain | 19 September 2023 |
| 127 | Kenya | 20 September 2023 |
| 128 | Ireland | 21 September 2023 |
| 129 | Benin | 21 September 2023 |
| 130 | Saudi Arabia | 2023 |
| 131 | Ghana | 15 February 2024 |
| 132 | Philippines | 8 May 2025 |
| 133 | Jordan | 24 May 2025 |
| 134 | Gambia | 18 June 2025 |
| 135 | Andorra | 24 September 2025 |
| 136 | Cape Verde | 25 September 2025 |
| 137 | Bangladesh | 5 February 2026 |
| 138 | Nepal | 22 September 2026 |
| 139 | Namibia | 26 September 2026 |

== Bilateral relations ==
| Country | Formal Relations Began | Notes |
|---|---|---|
| Australia | | Australia is represented in Grenada by its High Commission in Trinidad and Tobago.; Both countries are full members of the Commonwealth of Nations. |
| Austria | 3 November 1978 | Both countries established diplomatic relations on 3 November 1978: Austria is represented in Grenada by its embassy in Havana, Cuba.; Grenada has an honorary consulate in Vienna. |
| Barbados | 3 March 1974 | Both countries established diplomatic relations on 3 March 1974. See also: Barbados and CARICOM |
| Canada | 7 February 1974 | See Canada-Grenada relations Both countries established diplomatic relations on 7 February 1974 Grenada has a consulate general in Toronto, Ontario, Canada. |
| China | 20 January 2005 (before from 1 October 1985 to 8 August 1989) | See China–Grenada relations Grenada announced the resumption of diplomatic ties with the People's Republic of China on January 20, 2005. |
| Cuba | 14 April 1979 | See Cuba–Grenada relations Both countries established diplomatic relations on 14 April 1979 |
| Denmark | 6 November 2018 | Both countries established diplomatic relations on 6 November 2018 Denmark is represented in Grenada through a consulate. |
| Dominica | | Both countries are full members of the Commonwealth of Nations, of the Organization of American States and of the Caribbean Community. |
| Haiti | | As a member of CARICOM Grenada strongly backed efforts by the United States to implement United Nations Security Council Resolution 940, designed to facilitate the departure of Haiti's de facto authorities from power. Grenada subsequently contributed personnel to the multinational force which restored the democratically elected government of Haiti in October 1994. |
| India | 1 October 1975 | See Grenada–India relations Both countries established diplomatic relations on 1 October 1975 The relations between the two can be traced back from mid-19th century when both were under the greater British colony. Both have friendly relations till date.: India has its accredited diplomatic mission through its High Commission in Port of Spain, Trinidad and Tobago.; Grenada has presently no diplomatic mission. |
| Italy | | Italy is represented in Grenada by its embassy in Caracas, Venezuela.; Grenada has an honorary consulate in Florence. |
| Malaysia | | Malaysia is represented in Grenada by its embassy in Caracas, Venezuela.; Both countries are full members of the Commonwealth of Nations. |
| New Zealand | 2013 | New Zealand is represented in Grenada by its embassy in Bridgetown, Barbados.; Both countries are full members of the Commonwealth of Nations. |
| Romania | 3 April 1975 | Both countries established diplomatic relations on 3 April 1975 Grenadian–Romanian relations are foreign relations between Grenada and Romania. Both countries are full members of the United Nations. The relations were formal diplomatic relations between Grenada and Romania. Grenada and Romania full diplomatic relations were established on the Thursday 3 April 1975. |
| Russia | 7 September 1979, severed 3 November 1983, Restored 17 September 2002 | See Grenada – Soviet Union relations During the New Jewel Movement, the Soviet Union tried to make the island of Grenada to function as a Soviet base, and also by getting supplies from Cuba. In October 1983, during the U.S. invasion of Grenada, U.S. President Ronald Reagan maintained that US Marines arrived on the island of Grenada, which was considered a Soviet-Cuban ally that would export communist revolution throughout the Caribbean. In November, at a joint hearing of Congressional Subcommittee, it was told that Grenada could be used as a staging area for subversion of the nearby countries, for intersection of shipping lanes, and for the transit of troops and supplies from Cuba to Africa, and from Eastern Europe and Libya to Central America. In December, the State Department published a preliminary report on Grenada, in which was claimed as an "Island of Soviet Internationalism". When the US Marines landed on the island, they discovered a large amount of documents, which included agreements between the Soviet Government, and the New Jewel Movement, recorded minutes of the Committee meetings, and reports from the Grenadian embassy in Moscow. Diplomatic relations between Grenada and the Soviet Union were severed in 1983 by the Governor General of Grenada. Eventually in 2002, Grenada re-established diplomatic relations with the newly formed Russian Federation. |
| South Korea | 1 August 1974, severed 23 July 1980, Restored 17 May 1984 | See Grenada–South Korea relations The establishment of diplomatic relations between South Korea and Grenada started on 1 August 1974 and the bilateral trade in 2012 were exports : $1.78 and million imports : $140 thousand. |
| Turkey | Feb. 25, 1975 | Turkish Embassy in Port of Spain is accredited to Grenada.; Trade volume between the two countries was US$910 thousand in 2019. |
| UAE | March 1975 | In September 2004 York House, the building housing the Parliament of Grenada was destroyed by Hurricane Ivan, the government of the UAE contributed US$4.5 million (of the US$12.2) to construct the new Parliament building completed in 2018. |
| United Kingdom | 7 February 1974 | See Grenada–United Kingdom relations Grenada established diplomatic relations the United Kingdom on 7 February 1974. Both countries are Commonwealth Realms.: Grenada maintains a high commission in London.; The United Kingdom is accredited to Grenada through its high commission in Saint George's.; The UK governed Grenada from 1762 to 1974, when Grenada achieved full independence. Both countries share common membership of the Caribbean Development Bank, the Commonwealth, the International Criminal Court, the United Nations, and the World Trade Organization, as well as the CARIFORUM–UK Economic Partnership Agreement. |
| United States | 29 November 1974 | See Grenada–United States relations Both countries established diplomatic relations on 29 November 1974 The U.S. Government established an embassy in Grenada in November 1983. The U.S. Ambassador to Grenada is resident in Bridgetown, Barbados. The embassy in Grenada is staffed by a chargé d'affaires who reports to the ambassador in Bridgetown. Grenada has an embassy in Washington, D.C., and a consulate general in New York City. The U.S. Agency for International Development (USAID) played a major role in Grenada's development. In addition to the $45 million emergency aid for reconstruction from 2004's Hurricane Ivan, USAID provided more than $120 million in economic assistance from 1984 to 1993. About 25 Peace Corps volunteers in Grenada teach special education, remedial reading, and vocational training and assist with HIV/AIDS work. Grenada receives counter-narcotics assistance from the United States and benefits from U.S. military exercise-related construction and humanitarian civic action projects. Prime Minister Keith Mitchell joined President Bill Clinton, in May 1997, for a meeting with 14 other Caribbean leaders during the first-ever U.S.-regional summit in Bridgetown, Barbados. The summit strengthened the basis for regional cooperation on justice and counter-narcotics issues, finance and development, and trade. |

== See also ==
- List of diplomatic missions in Grenada
- List of diplomatic missions of Grenada
