= Grenada–India relations =

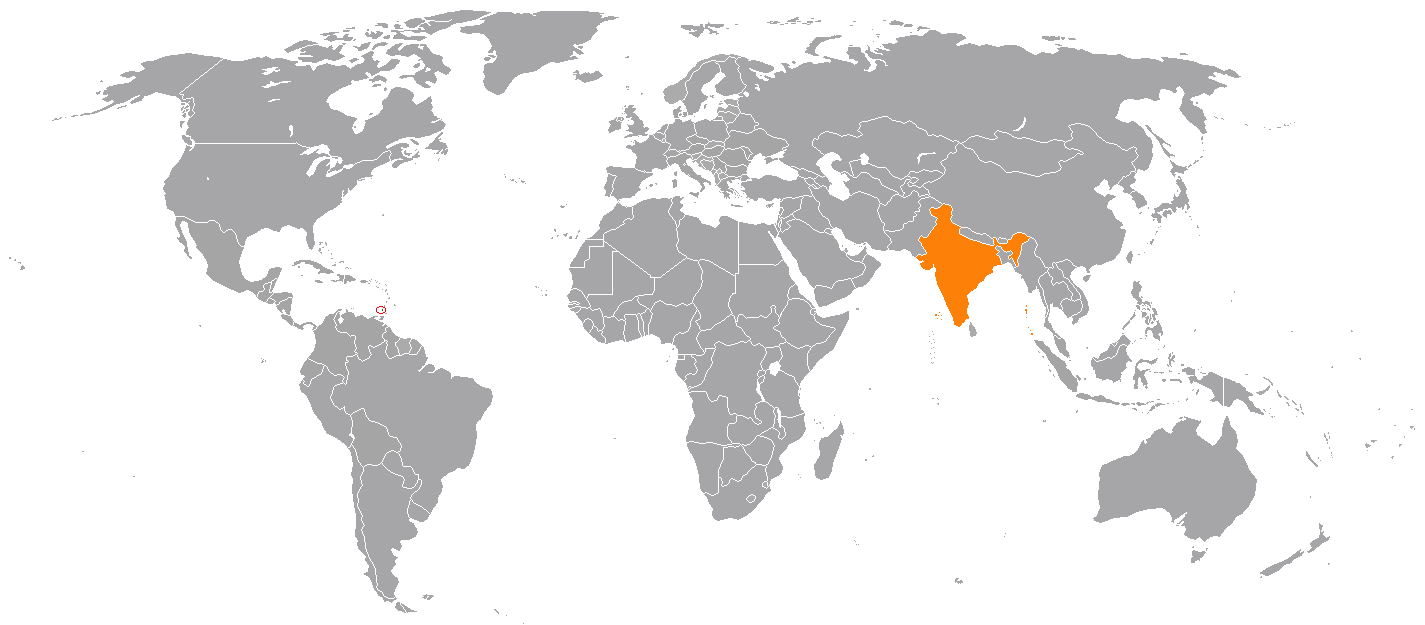

- Grenada: India

Grenada–India relations refers to the international relations that exist between Grenada and India. The High Commission of India in Port of Spain, Trinidad and Tobago is concurrently accredited to Grenada. Grenada has no diplomatic mission in India.

== History ==
Relations between Grenada and India date back to the mid-19th century when both countries were British colonies. The first Indians in Grenada arrived at Irwin's Bay in Saint Patrick Parish, Grenada on 1 May 1857 on board the Maidstone. The ship had departed from Calcutta on 27 January 1857 with 375 Indian indentured workers on board. Eighty-six Indians died during the voyage and only 289 would arrive in Grenada. Several ships transported indentured labourers from India to Grenada in the following decades. The last ship carrying Indian indentured workers arrived on the island sometime between 1881 and 1885. In total, nearly 3,206 Indians were brought to Grenada, excluding those who died during the voyage. Only about 15% returned to India, while the rest remained in the country even after their indenture period ended in 1890. These Indians are the origin of the Indo-Grenadian community. Grenadian Prime Minister Keith Mitchell visited India on 26–30 July 2006 in to conduct preparatory activities for the 2007 Cricket World Cup in the West Indies. He met with Prime Minister Manmohan Singh on 29 July 2006.

A delegation from the Indian Ministry of Micro, Small and Medium Enterprises, and the National Small Industries Corporation (NSIC) visited Grenada in early 2010 to discuss opportunities for cooperation in the field of small and medium enterprises with Grenadian government officials.

== Trade ==
Bilateral trade between Grenada and India is constrained by the large distance between the two countries and the small size of the Grenadian economy. Trade between the two countries totaled US$1.87 million in 2015–16, recording a growth of 40% over the previous fiscal. The main commodities exported by India to Grenada are pharmaceutical products, jewellery, readymade garments, textiles and home furnishings. India has made no imports from Grenada since 2011–12, when it imported $300,000 worth of electrical equipment and machinery from Grenada.

== Cultural relations ==
The Indian community has had a significant influence on Grenadian culture. Bamboo firecrackers were brought to Grenada from India. Cannabis (known as ganja) was introduced to the country by Indian indentured workers, who used the intoxicant to prepare bhang which they would consume to relax after working on the plantations. Indian food such as breads, roti and bhajji are popular in Grenada. Talkari is a type of Indian curry popular among Indo-Grenadians. Most of the Indo-Grenadian community speaks English, the official language of Grenada, and do not use Hindi and Bhojpuri, the language of their ancestors. However, some Indian words, particularly those relating to food such as aloo (potato), geera/jeera (cumin), karela (bitter gourd), seim, chownkay, and baylay are still used by the community. The term bhai, meaning "brother" in Hindi, is a common form of greeting amongst Indo-Grenadians males of equal status.

A bust of Mahatma Gandhi was installed at the Mac Donald College in Saint Patrick Parish in January 2013.

== Indo-Grenadians ==
Indo-Grenadians are Grenadian nationals of Indian descent. They are descended from the Indian indentured workers who first arrived in the country on 1 May 1857. According to the 2001 Census of Grenada, Indo-Grenadians made up 1.6% of the country's population and were the third largest ethnic group in country, after Africans (89.4%) and people of mixed race (8.2%). As of December 2016, there are an estimated 3,000 Indo-Grenadians. The Indo-Grenada Heritage Foundation (IGHF), established in 2007, is the most prominent organization representing the community.

As of December 2016, there is a small community of Indian citizens in Grenada. They are mostly businessmen dealing in general merchandise and small scale trading activities. A few Indians are professionals and academics teaching at St. George‟s University. There are also a small number of Indian American students in Grenada.

=== Indian Arrival Day ===
The 100th anniversary of the first arrival of Indians in Grenada was commemorated in 1957. This was the first ever commemoration of the day in Grenada. The next commemoration would occur more than five decades later in 2009. On 29 April 2009, the Government of Grenada declared that 1 May would officially be designated as Indian Arrival Day and observed annually alongside the existing Labour Day. The date was already a public holiday in Grenada, on account of Labour Day. The Government also announced that Boucherie Road, the road leading to the site of the arrival of the Maidstone, would be officially renamed Maidstone Road to honour the arrival of Indians in Grenada. The renaming was officially carried out in a ceremony at 10:30 AM at La Fortune Junction, St. Patrick on 2 May 2009. Governor General Sir Carlyle Glean unveiled a granite plaque commemorating the arrival of the first Indians in Grenada. The plaque bears the inscription, "On 1st May 1857, in this bay the sailing vessel "Maidstone" anchored and landed 287 passengers having left India three months earlier, with 304 passengers. Between the years 1857 and 1890 other ships anchored in this and other bays bringing a total of 3,200 persons from India to work as agricultural indenture labourers in Grenada. This monument is dedicated to those who became the genesis of the Indo-Grenadian population of our nation".

== Foreign aid ==
India sent emergency medical supplies and roofing material towards disaster relief in the aftermath of Hurricane Ivan in Grenada in 2004. The Governments of the two countries signed an MoU in October 2008, agreeing to establish an ICT Centre for Excellence and Innovations in Grenada with Indian assistance. The centre was built at a cost of $800,000 and was officially inaugurated at St. George's University by Prime Minister Tillman Thomas on 15 April 2011. The centre was relocated to T.A. Marryshow Community College in February 2016, at the request of the Indian High Commissioner to Grenada.

The High Commission of India in Port of Spain donated cricket equipment to the Saint Mark Parish on 7 February 2011, Grenada National Day. The Government of Grenada requested funding for infrastructure projects in the country. In 2016, India approved funds of $610,000 to build a Union Community Complex at the current location of the River Sallee Community Centre, and $292,000 to construct Belle Vue Road.

Citizens of Grenada are eligible for scholarships under the Indian Technical and Economic Cooperation Programme. The most popular ITEC courses among Grenadians are ICT skills, and management and training in SMEs.
