= List of diplomatic missions of Grenada =

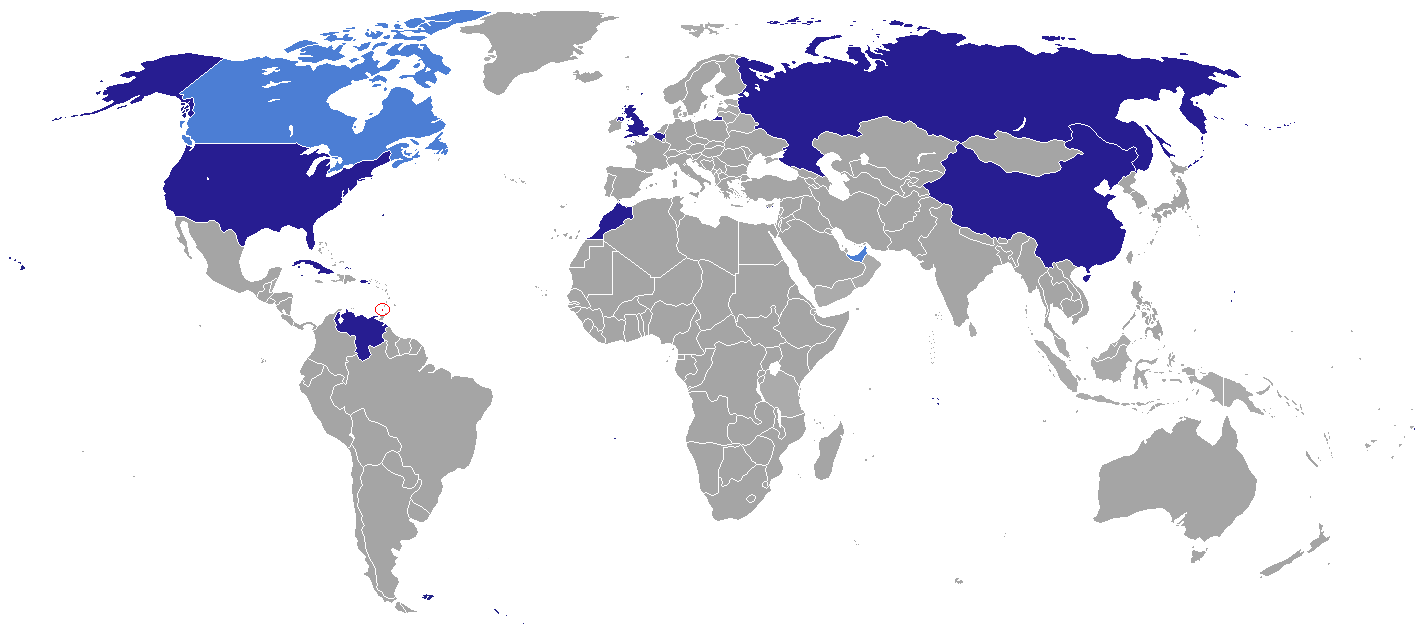
Location of diplomatic missions of Grenada: Grenada Embassy or High Commission

This is a list of diplomatic missions of Grenada. Grenada has a modest number of diplomatic missions, commensurate with its size. Its embassy and mission to the European Union in Brussels and its embassy in Morocco is shared with other East Caribbean states.

== Current missions ==
=== Africa ===
Host country	Host city	Mission	Concurrent accreditation	Ref.
Morocco	Rabat	Embassy		

=== Americas ===
Host country	Host city	Mission	Concurrent accreditation	Ref.
Canada	Toronto	Consulate-General		
Cuba	Havana	Embassy		
United States	Washington, D.C.	Embassy	Country: Canada; International Organizations: Organization of American States	
United States	Miami	Consulate-General	Country: Canada; International Organizations: Organization of American States	
United States	New York City	Consulate-General	Country: Canada; International Organizations: Organization of American States	
Venezuela	Caracas	Embassy		

=== Asia ===
Host country	Host city	Mission	Concurrent accreditation	Ref.
China	Beijing	Embassy		
United Arab Emirates	Dubai	Consulate-General		

=== Europe ===
Host country	Host city	Mission	Concurrent accreditation	Ref.
Belgium	Brussels	Embassy	International Organizations: European Union	
Russia	Moscow	Embassy		
United Kingdom	London	High Commission		

=== Multilateral organizations ===
Organization	Host city	Host country	Mission	Ref.
United Nations	Geneva	Switzerland	Permanent Mission	
United Nations	New York City	United States	Permanent Mission	Countries: Guatemala

== Gallery ==
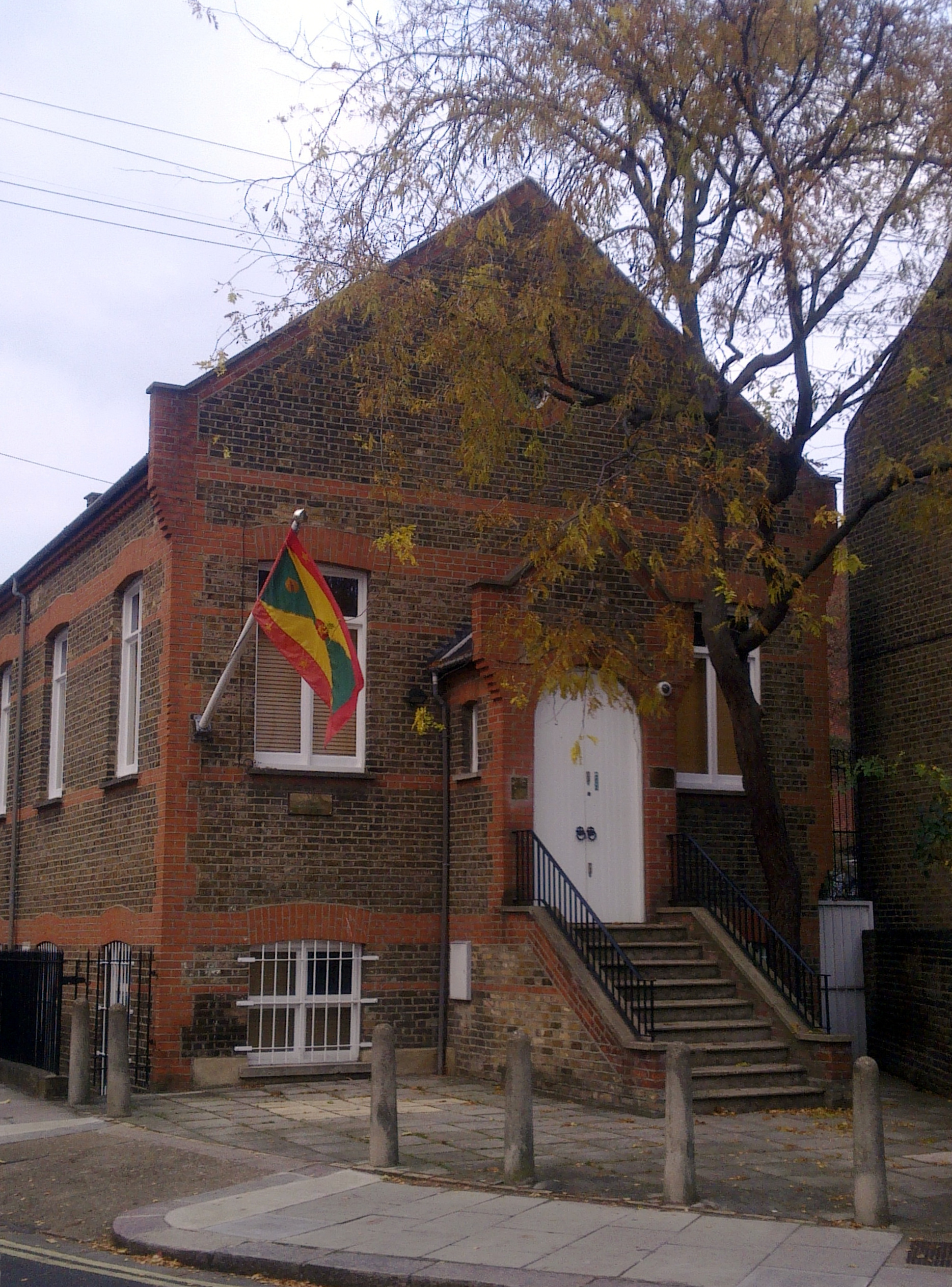
High Commission in London

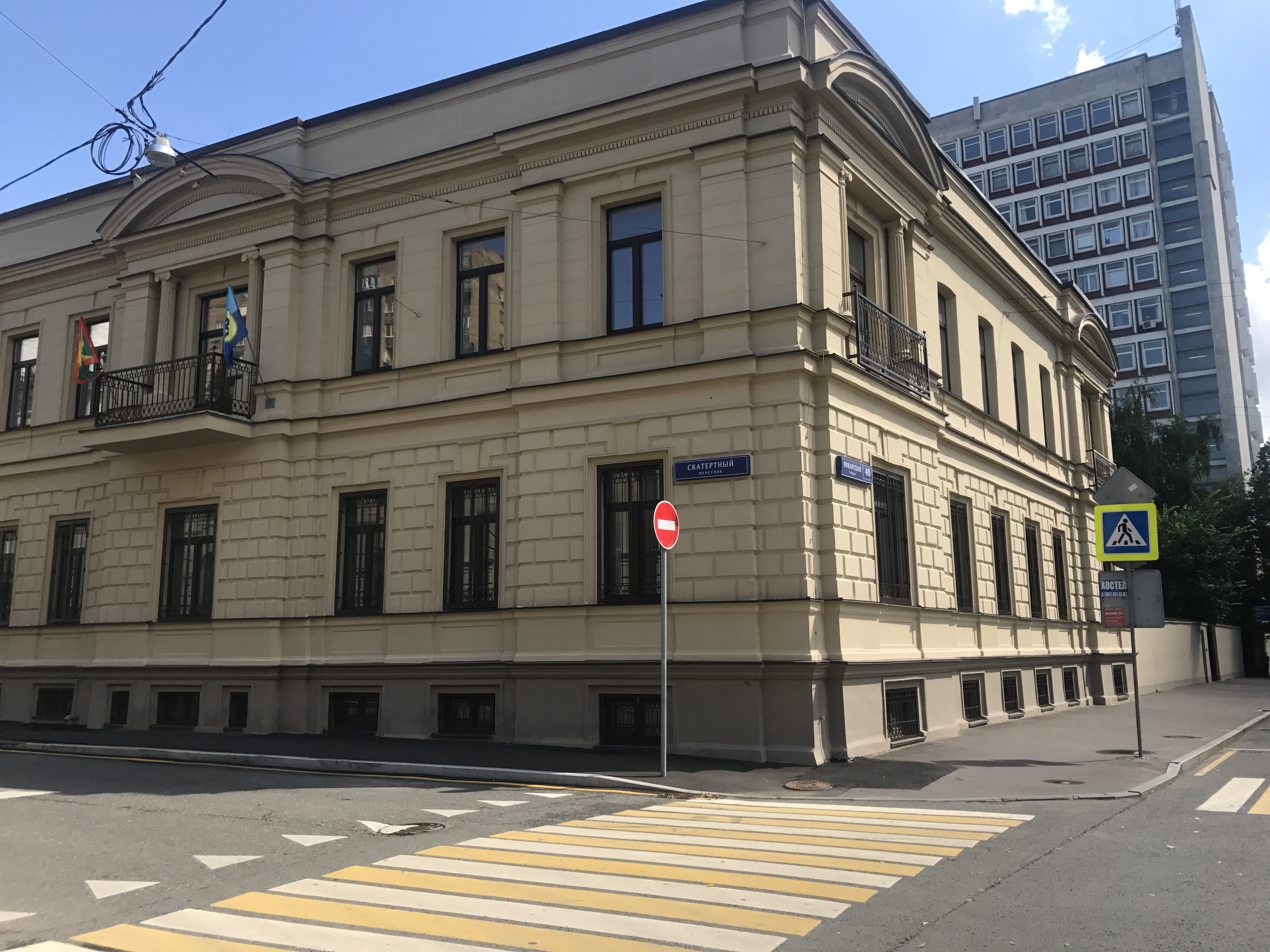
Embassy in Moscow

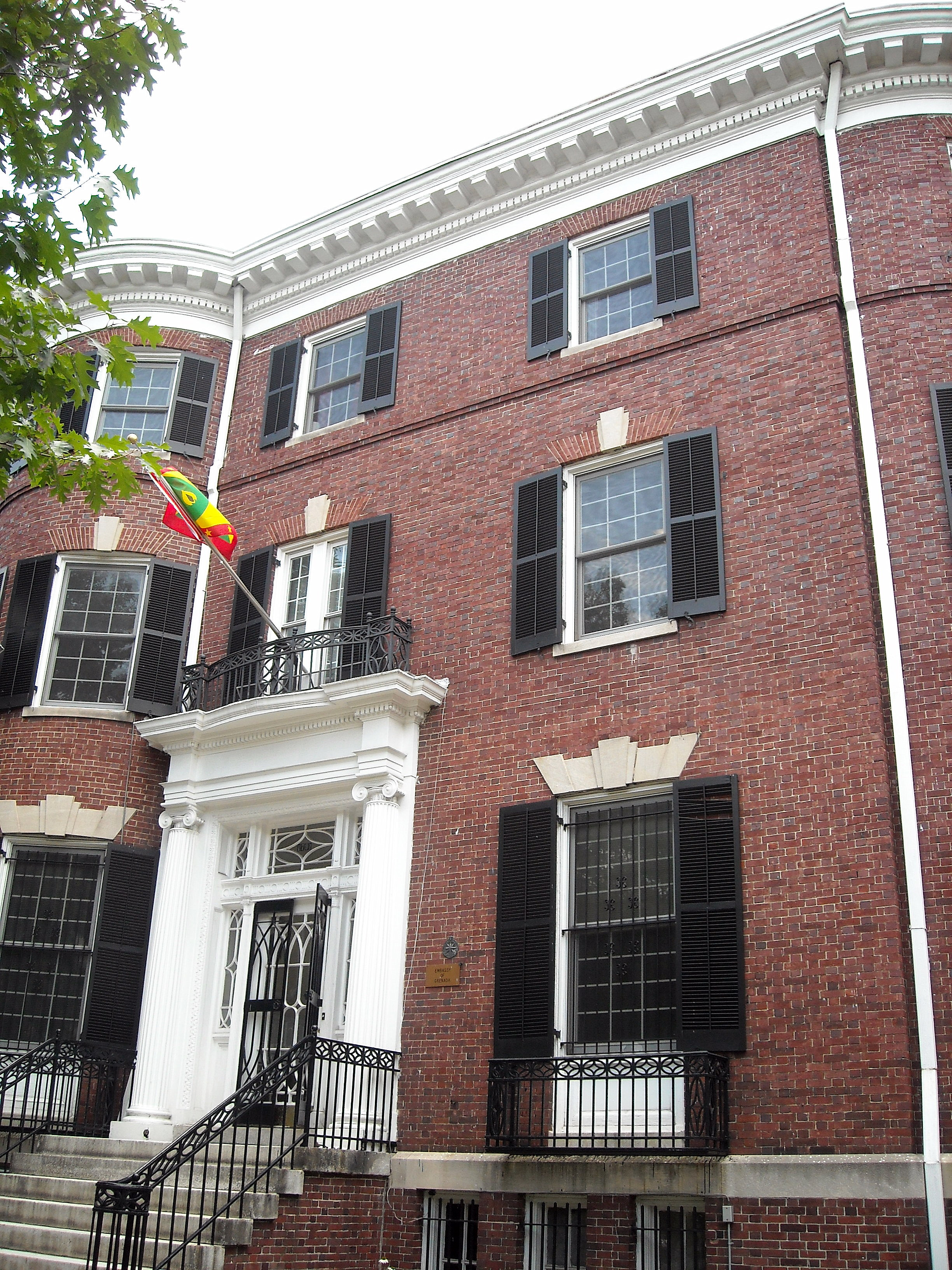
Embassy in Washington, D.C.

== See also ==
- Foreign relations of Grenada
- List of diplomatic missions in Grenada
